= Names of the Yuan dynasty =

Names for the Yuan dynasty

The Yuan dynasty (English: /jɜːn/) was an imperial dynasty established in China by the Mongols and the Khagan-ruled division of the Mongol Empire after the division of the Mongol Empire.

== Names ==
=== Great Yuan ===
Yuan dynasty
- Chinese: 元朝
- Literal meaning: "Yuan dynasty"
Transcriptions
Standard Mandarin
- Hanyu Pinyin: Yuán cháo
- Bopomofo: ㄩㄢˊ ㄔㄠˊ
- Wade–Giles: Yüan^{2} ch‘ao^{2}
- Tongyong Pinyin: Yuán cháo
- IPA: [ɥɛ̌n ʈʂʰǎʊ]
Wu
- Suzhounese: Gnioe^{2} zau^{2}
Yue: Cantonese
- Yale Romanization: Yùhn chìuh
- Jyutping: Jyun4 ciu4
- IPA: [jyn˩ tsʰiw˩]
Southern Min
- Tâi-lô: Guân tiâo

Dynastic name
- Chinese: 大元
- Literal meaning: Great Yuan
Transcriptions
Standard Mandarin
- Hanyu Pinyin: Dà Yuán
- Bopomofo: ㄉㄚˋ ㄩㄢˊ
- Wade–Giles: Ta^{4} Yüan^{2}
- Tongyong Pinyin: Dà Yuán
- IPA: [tâ ɥɛ̌n]
Yue: Cantonese
- Jyutping: daai6 jyun4
- IPA: [taj˨ jyn˩]

Alternative official full name: ᠳᠠᠢ ᠶᠤᠸᠠᠨ ᠶᠡᠬᠡ ᠮᠣᠩᠭᠣᠯ ᠤᠯᠤᠰ Dai Yuwan Yeqe Mongɣul Ulus
- Traditional Chinese: 大元大蒙古國
- Simplified Chinese: 大元大蒙古国
- Literal meaning: "Great Yuan" (Middle Mongol transliteration of Chinese "Dà Yuán") Great Mongol State
Transcriptions
Standard Mandarin
- Hanyu Pinyin: Dà Yuán Dà Měnggǔ Guó
- Bopomofo: ㄉㄚˋ ㄩㄢˊ ㄉㄚˋ ㄇㄥˇ ㄍㄨˇ ㄍㄨㄛˊ
- Wade–Giles: Ta^{4} Yüan^{2} Ta^{4} Meng^{3}-ku^{3} Kuo^{2}
- Tongyong Pinyin: Dà Yuán Dà Měng-gǔ Guó
- IPA: [tâ ɥɛ̌n tâ mə̀ŋ.kù kwǒ]

In 1271, Kublai Khan imposed the name Great Yuan (Chinese: 大元; pinyin: Dà Yuán), establishing the Yuan dynasty. While "Great" (大; Dà) served as a honorific modifier for earlier dynasties of China such as the Han and Tang, the Yuan dynasty was the first dynasty ruling all of China proper that adopted "Great" as part of the official title.

According to the "Decree on the Establishment of the National Title" (建國號詔), Dà Yuán (大元) refers to a clause on the first hexagram (乾; Qián) from the Commentaries on the I Ching which states, "great indeed is the primal unity" (大哉乾元; dà zāi Qián Yuán; 'Great is Qián', 'the Primal'). "Yuan" is the most important virtue of the first hexagram and represents the beginning of everything, the primordial essence of the universe, and the master of celestial virtue. It encapsulates the essence of sky worship in Mongolian shamanism while appealing to the sensibilities of the Han Chinese population. Other connotations of "Yuan" include greatness, excellence, big, head, and leader. The political compendium Jingshi Dadian (經世大典) published by the Yuan dynasty in 1331 interpreted "Yuan" as "supreme vastness" (大之至也), while many contemporary Han Chinese literati interpreted it as "benevolence" (仁). The title "Great Yuan" was used in various documents. For example, in the letter from Kublai's successor Temür Khan to Japan sent by Yishan Yining on his diplomatic mission in 1299, known as the "Letter from the Yuan dynasty to Japan" (元朝寄日本書), the title "Emperor of the Great Yuan" (大元皇帝) was used to refer to the Yuan emperor.

The Mongolian-language counterpart was Dai Ön Ulus, also rendered as Ikh Yuan Üls or Yekhe Yuan Ulus. In Mongolian, Da Yuan (大元; 'Great Yuan') was rendered as Dai Ön (ᠳᠠᠢ
ᠥᠨ) and often used in conjunction with the Mongolian term "Yeke Mongghul Ulus" (ᠶᠡᠬᠡ
ᠮᠣᠩᠭᠣᠯ
ᠤᠯᠤᠰ; 'Great Mongol State'), which resulted in the form ᠳᠠᠢ
ᠥᠨ
ᠶᠡᠬᠡ
ᠮᠣᠩᠭᠣᠯ
ᠤᠯᠤᠰ (Dai Ön Yeqe Mongɣul Ulus, lit. "Great Yuan – Great Mongol State") or ᠳᠠᠢ ᠦᠨ
ᠺᠡᠮᠡᠺᠦ
ᠶᠡᠬᠡ
ᠮᠣᠩᠭᠣᠯ
ᠤᠯᠤᠰ (Dai Ön qemeqü Yeqe Mongɣol Ulus, lit. "Great Mongol State called Great Yuan").

Tibetan-language sources show the use of the name "Great Yuan" (Tibetan: ད་ཡུན, Wylie: da yun) in an official capacity through seals affixed to imperial decrees. Surviving seals of the State and Imperial Preceptors bear the name "Great Yuan" and were used in Tibet during the Yuan dynasty. Several extant Tibetan-language decrees concerning matters such as monastic property and taxation likewise carried these seals, indicating that the name "Great Yuan" served as the official title with legal authority in Yuan-period Tibet. After a recounting of Chinese history from the Five Dynasties through the Southern Song, the Yuan-era Tibetan chronicle The Red Annals continued by introducing the Mongol polity, stating that it was known as the "Great Yuan".

After the Ming dynasty (1368–1644) replaced the Yuan dynasty in China, the title "Great Yuan" continued to be used by the Yuan remnants who retreated to Mongolia, known as the Northern Yuan (1368–1635), until 1388 when Uskhal Khan Tögüs Temür was killed by Jorightu Khan Yesüder. Yesüder was a descendant of Ariq Böke, whom Kublai defeated upon his accession as emperor of the Great Yuan, and he abandoned the title of "Great Yuan" along with other Chinese style titles. Descendants of Kublai and Toghon Temür became increasingly diminished as political figureheads legitimating powerful figures wielding authority on behalf of the Chinggisid line. Surviving Chinese and Korean sources in the 15th and 16th centuries rarely mention the Great Yuan or steppe leaders referring to themselves as descendants of the Great Yuan. Ming dynasty documents call the rulers of eastern Mongolia "Tatar Princes" (韃靼王子; dada wangzi) while a Mongolian envoy to Joseon in 1442 called his master the "Mongol Emperor" (蒙古皇帝; Menggu huangdi). Some argue that this was a rejection of the Great Yuan by the Mongols who saw the Kublaids as representatives of a disastrous relationship with "Chinese ways". Others suggest that the Great Yuan and the Kublaid lineage were merely one component of the Mongol Empire and did not occupy an important place in the Mongol worldview. Another line of argument points out that certain Mongol leaders did evoke the Great Yuan: Taisun Khan in the 1440s, Esen Taishi in the 1450s, Manduul Khan in the 1470s, Dayan Khan in the late 15th and early 16th centuries, and Ligdan Khan in the early 17th century. As a result, some scholars in favor of the "long Great Yuan" see identification with the Great Yuan as an "ideology in reserve" that was evoked intermittently under certain conditions while the Mongol Empire or Mongol traditions held greater appeal for much of the period.

=== "Yeke Mongghol Ulus" and "Empire of the Great Khan" ===
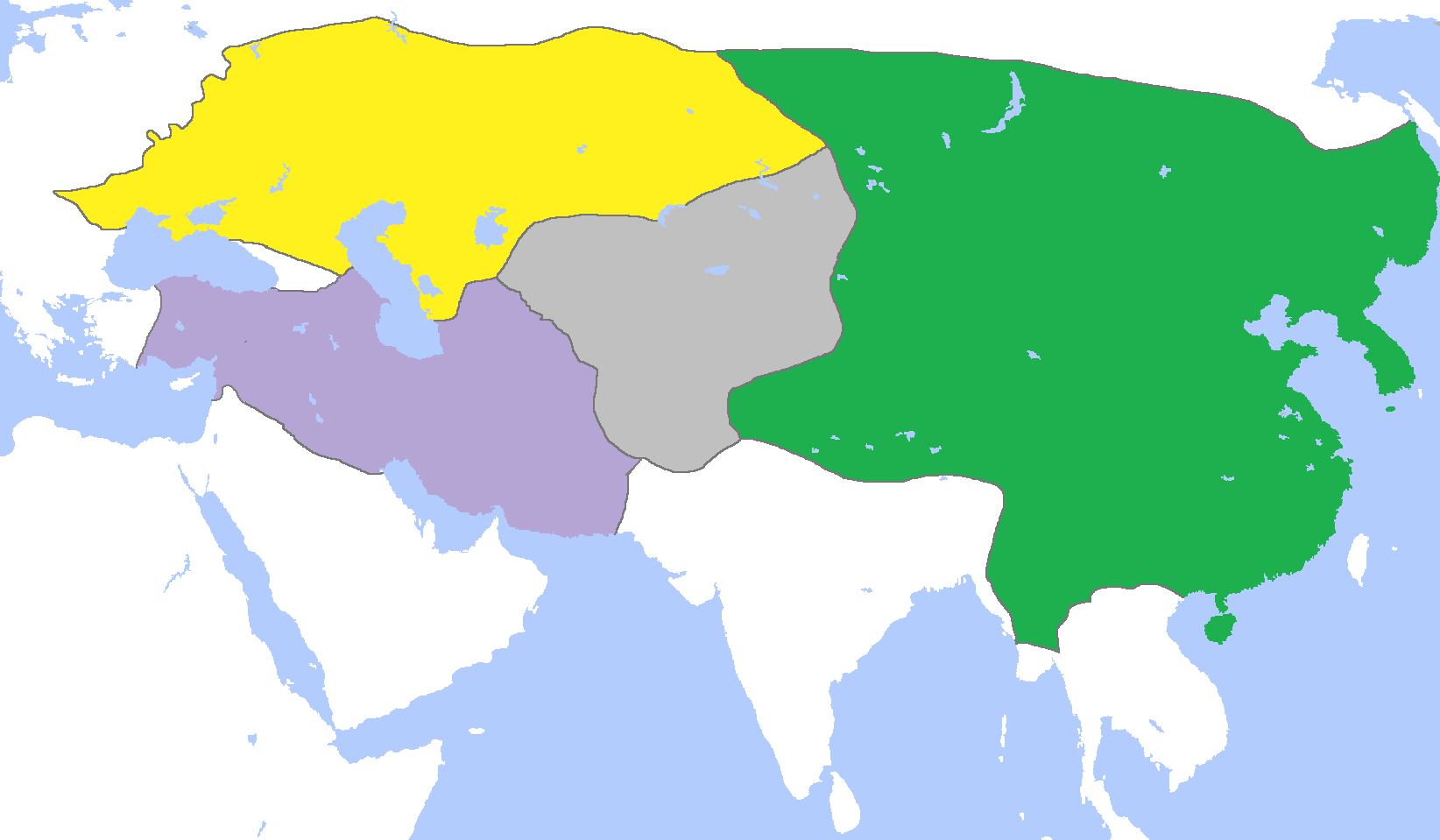
The Mongol khanates in 1300, with the Yuan dynasty in green. The western khanates included the Ilkhanate (purple), the Chagatai Khanate (gray), and the Golden Horde (yellow).

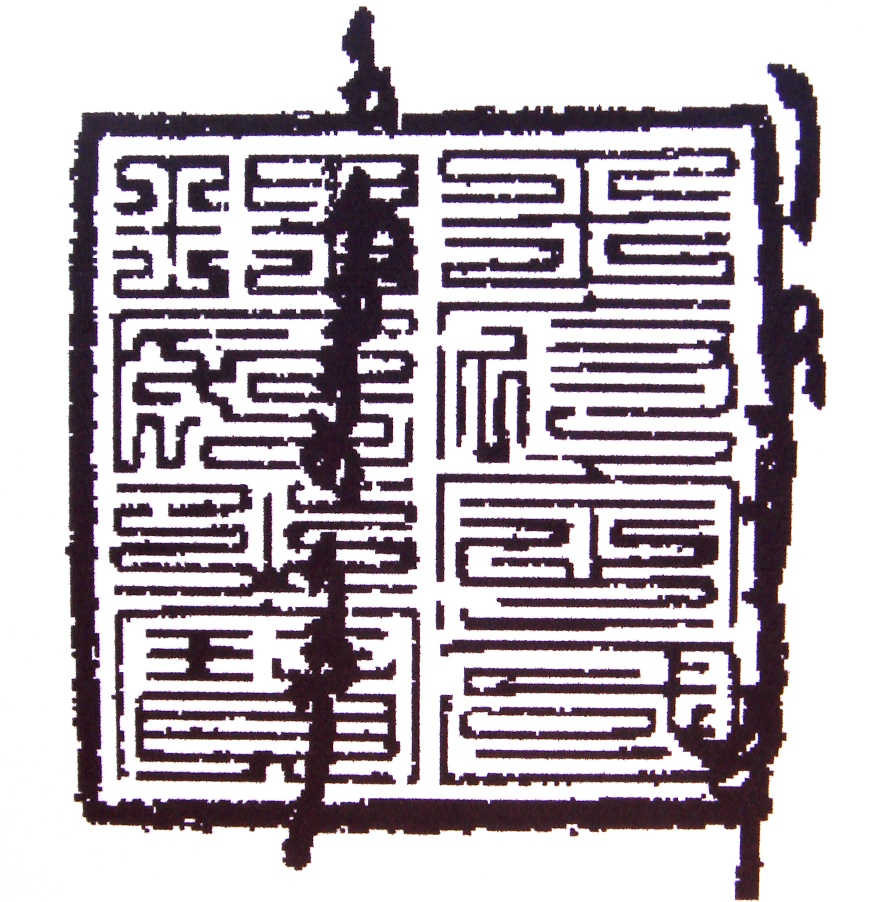
Seal of Ghazan of the Ilkhanate, given by the Yuan emperor and used in a 1302 letter to Pope Boniface VIII. The inscription in Chinese seal script reads "王府定國理民之寶", meaning "Treasure certifying the authority of his Royal Highness to establish a country and govern its people".

The Mongolian term Yeke Mongghol Ulus (lit. "Great Mongol State"), was another name for the Yuan, and it was in concurrent use with the name "Great Yuan" after the founding of the Yuan dynasty. However, even though the claim to supremacy by the Yuan emperors was at times recognized by the western khanates, their subservience was nominal and each continued its own separate development.

The earliest recorded document from the Mongol Empire containing the full name "Yeke Mongghol Ulus" is a letter from Guyuk Khan to Pope Innocent IV in 1246. In Chinese, it was translated as Da Mengguguo (大蒙古國; lit. "Great Mongol State"), or simply Dachao (大朝; lit. "Great dynasty") at that time. After Kublai's establishment of the Yuan dynasty, the Chinese terms Da Mengguguo and Dachao were replaced by Da Yuan (大元; lit. "Great Yuan") or Yuan Chao (元朝; lit. "Yuan dynasty") accordingly, whereas "Yeke Mongghol Ulus" became an equivalent Mongolian name for "Great Yuan" in the Yuan realm and was often combined with Great Yuan to form a single name in Mongolian. The dual language Chinese-Mongolian stele of 1335 in China bears the Chinese inscription Huang Yuan (皇元, lit. "Imperial Yuan") and Mongolian inscription Yeqe Mongɣul Ulus (lit. "Great Mongol State"). Mongolian inscriptions of the dual-language steles from 1338 and 1362 contain the phrase Dai Ön qemeqü Yeqe Mongɣol Ulus (lit. "Great Mongol State called Great Yuan") and Dai Ön Yeqe Mongɣol Ulus (lit. "Great Yuan Great Mongol State") respectively.

The Yuan dynasty was understood by Han Chinese literati during the Yuan era as the dynastic title adopted by Kublai in China and typically refers to the realm with its capital situated in Dadu (modern-day Beijing). However, Mongols of the Yuan dynasty saw Da Yuan as the Chinese expression for Yeke Mongghol Ulus, the Mongolian name for the entire Mongol Empire, despite the division of the Mongol Empire. The Mongols and many Semu people (such as the Turks and Persians) referred to the eastern division of the Mongol Empire as Yeke ulus (Great state), Khagan ulus (State of the Great Khan) or Mamlakat-i Qa'an (Kingdom of the Great Khan), and there is no evidence that Da Yuan was used in the western khanates to refer to the Mongol Empire or the eastern division. Kublai never relinquished the title of Khagan (Great Khan), which he took in 1260 along with the reign title zhongtong (中統). As such, the Yuan was also sometimes referred to as the "Empire of the Great Khan".

While the Kublaids held the title of Khagan and claimed nominal supremacy over all Mongol successor states, in practice the other Mongol khanates were independent and viewed the Yuan emperor as a symbolic figure. Leaders like Kaidu rejected Kublai's authority completely, maintaining that they themselves represented the more legitimate succession to the Mongol Empire and criticizing Kublai for embracing Chinese ways. Succession in the khanates nominally required recognition from the Yuan emperor, but this was also largely symbolic. The Ilkhanate acknowledged the Yuan claims to supremacy in their coins and by accepting Yuan seals. However, the Golden Horde and Chagatai Khanate were in conflict with the Ilkhanate and the Yuan from 1269 to 1304. The Golden Horde sent intermittent embassies until 1341 but Chagataid forces continued to clash with the Yuan, although neither was able to conquer each other.

=== Other names ===
The abbreviated dynastic name "Yuan" (元) was widely used during the Yuan period. Examples include expressions such as Huang Yuan (皇元, "Imperial Yuan") and Wo Yuan (我元, "Our Yuan"), both of which employ only the single character Yuan to denote the dynasty.

The Yuan dynasty is sometimes also called the "Mongol dynasty" by westerners, akin to the Qing dynasty sometimes being referred to as the "Manchu dynasty" or "Manchu Dynasty of China".

== See also ==
- Names of China
- Names of the Qing dynasty
- Yuan dynasty in Inner Asia

== Sources ==
- Hu, A-Xiang (2026). The Origin and Evolution of China's Names I: The Reigning Dynasties. Routledge.
- Atwood, Christopher Pratt (2004). Encyclopedia of Mongolia and the Mongol Empire. Facts On File. ISBN 978-0-8160-4671-3.
- Robinson, David M. (2020), IN the Shadow of the Mongol Empire: Ming China and Eurasia, Cambridge University Press
