= Agbarjin =

Agbarjin Агваржин хаан ᠠᠭᠪᠠᠷᠵᠢᠨ
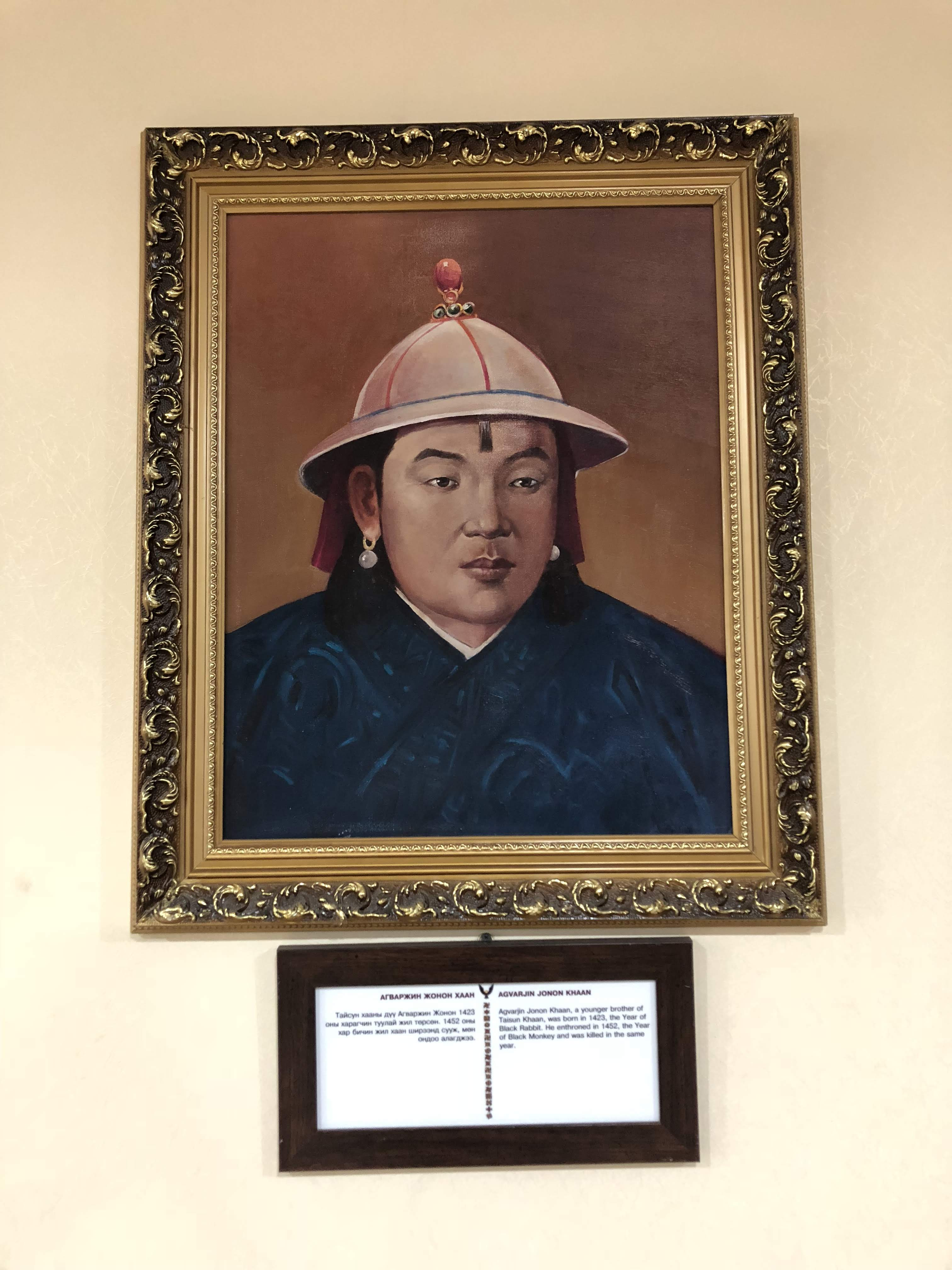

Khagan of the Northern Yuan dynasty
- Reign: 1454
- Predecessor: Tayisung Khan Toghtoa Bukha
- Successor: Esen Tayisi
- Born: 1423; Outer Mongolia
- Died: 1454 (aged 30–31); Outer Mongolia
Names
- Agbarjin
- House: Borjigin
- Dynasty: Northern Yuan
- Father: Ajai

Agbarjin (also spelled Agvarjin and Akbarjin; Mongolian: Агваржин; Chinese: 阿噶多爾濟), (1423–1454) was a claimant to the throne of the Northern Yuan dynasty in 1453. He was the youngest brother of Tayisung Khan Toghtoa Bukha and Manduul Khan.

Tayisung Khan appointed Agbarjin jinong over his ulus in 1433. When Toghtoa Bukha attempted to eliminate Esen Taishi's influence at the court, the Oirats offered Agbarjin the throne of khaganship for his betrayal. Even though the latter's son, Qara-qurtag Duuren taiji, persuaded his father not to accept this offer, the Oirats and Agbarjin attacked and defeated the Khagan, forcing him to flee westward. Tayisung Khagan Toghtoa Bukha was killed by his former father-in-law Tsabdan, whose daughter Altaghana had been banished from the ordo (palace).

The Oirats did not trust him, as he had betrayed his own eldest brother. Soon after the death of the Tayisung Khan, Agbarjin was invited by Esen to a banquet. When the former and his entourages arrived, Esen and the Oirat leaders murdered all Borjigin males in his entourage except Qara-qurtag, who fled and was later murdered, either in Moghulistan or Central Siberia. Agbarjin's death paved the way for Esen's enthronement in 1454.

== See also ==
- List of khans of the Northern Yuan dynasty

Agbarjin House of Borjigin Died: 1454
Regnal titles
Preceded by Tayisung Khan Toghtoa Bukha	Khagan of the Northern Yuan dynasty 1454	Succeeded by Esen
