= Mahakörgis Khan =

Ükegtü Khan Махагүргис Үхэгт хаан ᠥᠭᠡᠭᠲᠦ ᠬᠠᠭᠠᠨ
- Khagan of the Mongols
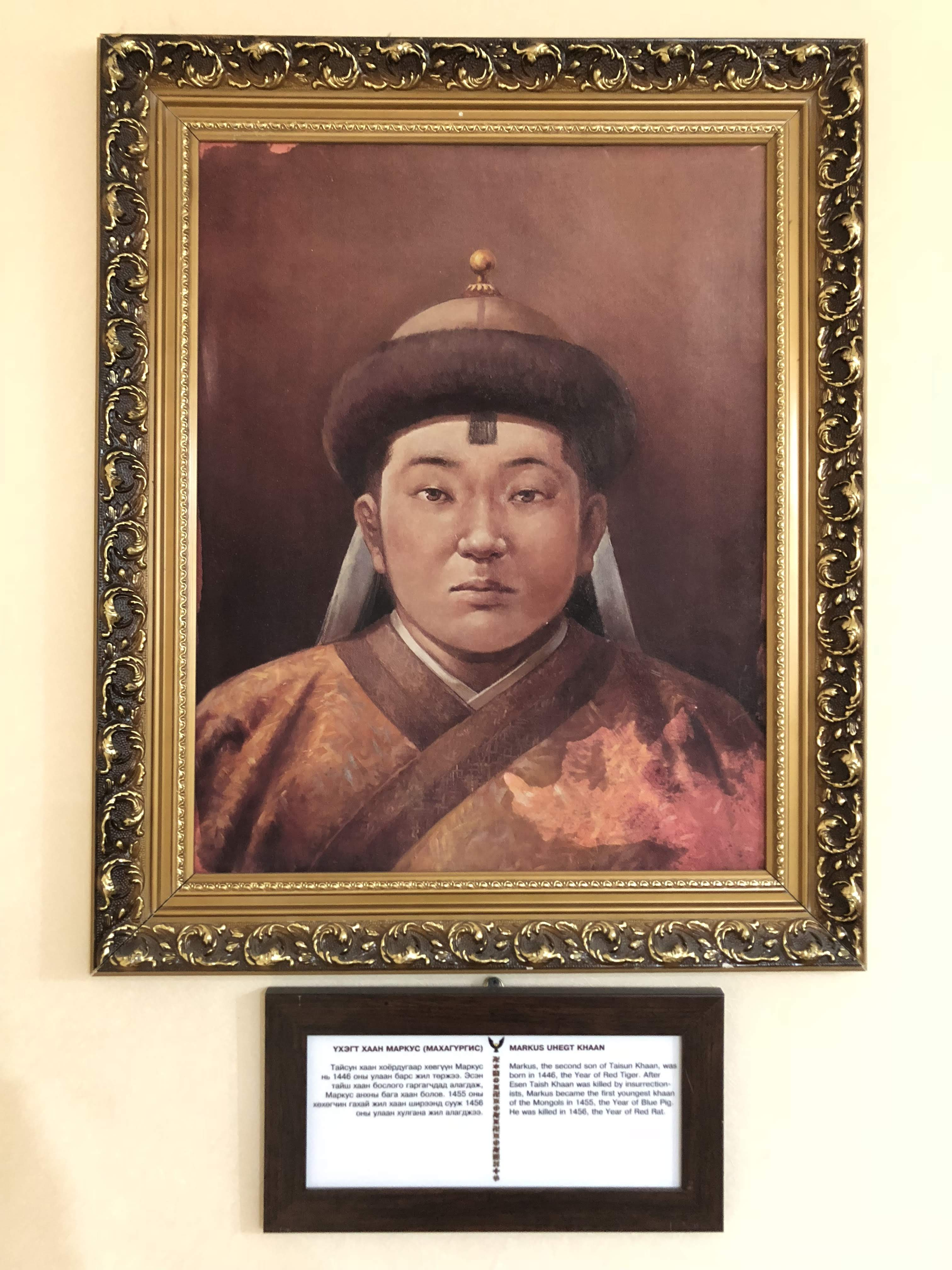

Khagan of the Northern Yuan dynasty
- Reign: 1455–1465
- Predecessor: Esen
- Successor: Molon Khan
- Born: 1448 (?); Outer Mongolia
- Died: 1465 (aged 16-17); Outer Mongolia
Names
- Mahakörgis
- House: Borjigin
- Dynasty: Northern Yuan
- Father: Tayisung Khan Toghtoa Bukha
- Mother: Samar taifu

Ükegtü Khan (Mongolian: Үхэгт Хаан; Chinese: 烏珂克圖汗), born Mahakörgis (or Markörgis; Mongolian: Маха Гүргис ᠮᠠᠬᠠᠬᠦᠷᠬᠢᠰ; Chinese: 馬兒古兒吉思), (1448?–1465) was a khagan of the Northern Yuan dynasty, reigning from 1455 to 1465. Some scholars believe his name is a Christian name.

Mahakörgis was the youngest son of Tayisung Khan Toghtoa Bukha and his youngest khatun, Samar. Soon after Esen was killed, his mother, Samar, attacked the Four Oirads in the Khangai Zavkhan. During the campaign, 8 year-old Mahakörgis was taken in a box on horseback, thus to be later called Ükegtü Khagan. They defeated the Oirads and returned with plundered goods.

After that, Samar taifu and Dogholon taishi of the seven Tümeds crowned the boy khagan. Bulay of the Kharchin and Dogholon held the real power, and constantly fought each other for dominance. Mahakörgis was given the title Ükegtü because he sat inside a cart during the battles.

Bulay tried to open trade relations with the Ming dynasty but was declined. Bulay repeatedly invaded the Ming in 1460 and 1461. He also attacked the Uriyangkhai Doyin guard (tributary of the Ming) in the next year. The Ming court finally agreed to establish peace with the Mongols.

In 1465, the Mongol nobles openly went to war against each other in their power struggle and Mahakörgis Ükegtü Khan was killed as a result. The young khan was succeeded by his eldest half-brother Molon Khan Tögüs Mengke.

== See also ==
- List of khans of the Northern Yuan dynasty

Mahakörgis Khan House of Borjigin Died: 1465
Regnal titles
Preceded by Esen of the Oirad	Khagan of the Northern Yuan dynasty 1455–1465	Succeeded by Molon Khan
