= Molon Khan =

- Khagan of the Mongols
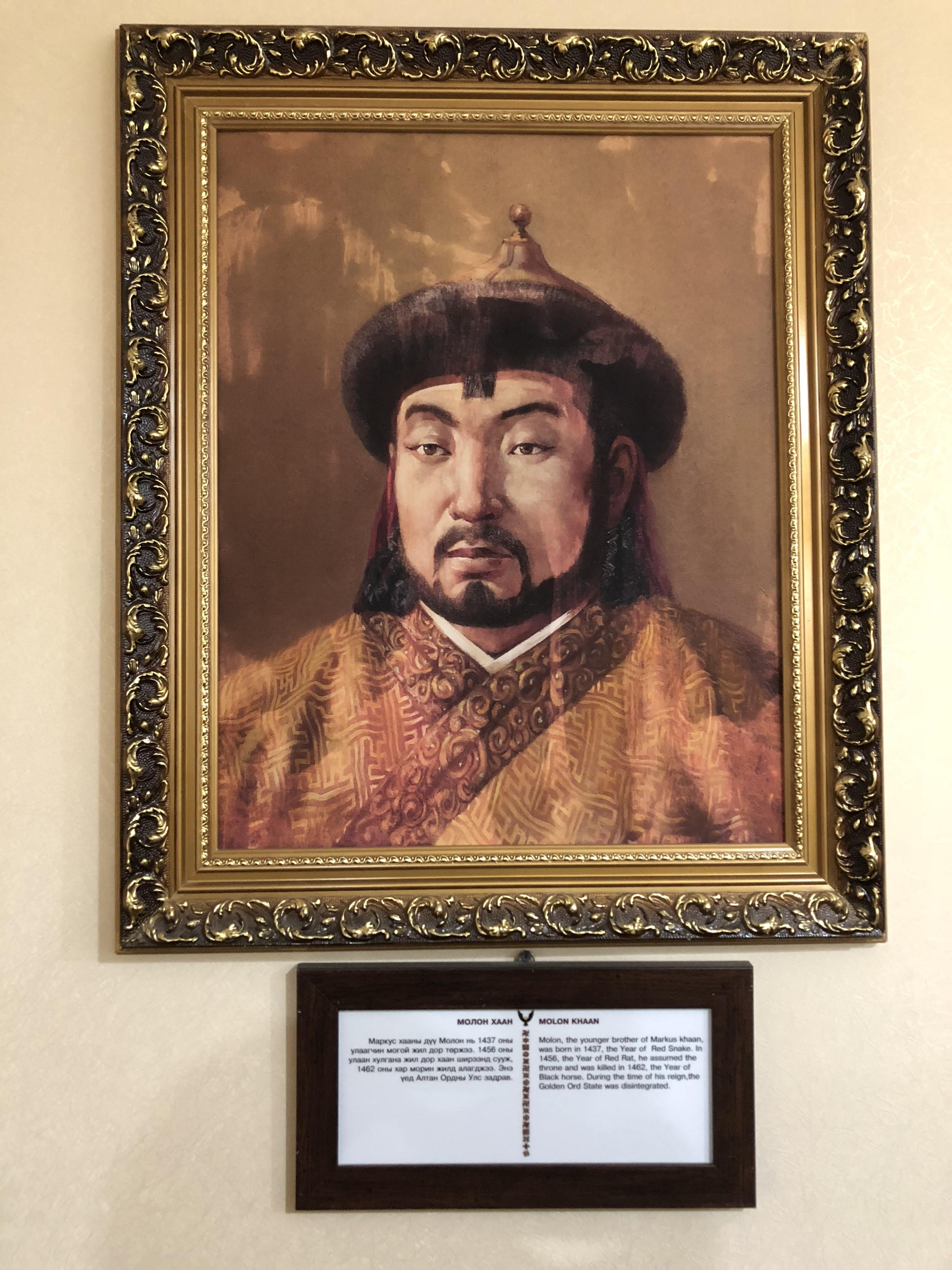

Khagan of the Northern Yuan dynasty
- Reign: 1465–1466
- Coronation: 1465
- Predecessor: Markörgis Khan
- Successor: Manduulun Khan
- Born: 1437
- Died: 1466 (aged 28–29)
- House: Borjigin
- Dynasty: Northern Yuan

Molon Khan (Mongolian: Молон Хаан; Chinese: 摩倫汗), born Tögüs Mengke (Chinese: 脫古思猛可), (1437–1466) was a khagan of the Northern Yuan dynasty, reigning from 1465 to 1466. He was the eldest son of Taisun Khan.

== Reign ==
Molon Khan succeeded his younger brother Mahakörgis Khan in 1465 and it was prophesied "By you the great people will regain strength in legal order. Ascend to throne as Khaan". But he met the same fate as his younger brother: due to lack of real power, he was killed by warring Mongol nobles who fought each other for dominance. After his death, the position of Great Khan remained vacant for nearly a decade as warring Mongol clans fought each other for power, and it was not until 1475 that the next khan, Manduul Khan, an uncle of Molon was crowned as khagan.

== See also ==
- List of khans of the Northern Yuan dynasty

Molon Khan House of Borjigin Died: 1465-1466
Regnal titles
Preceded by Markörgis Khan	Khagan of the Northern Yuan dynasty 1465–1466	Succeeded by Manduul Khan
