= Taisun Khan =

Great Khan of the Northern Yuan Empire

Taisun Khan Тогтобух Тайсун хаан ᠳᠠᠶᠢᠰᠤᠩ ᠬᠠᠭᠠᠨ
- Bogd Khagan of the Mongols or Great Yuan
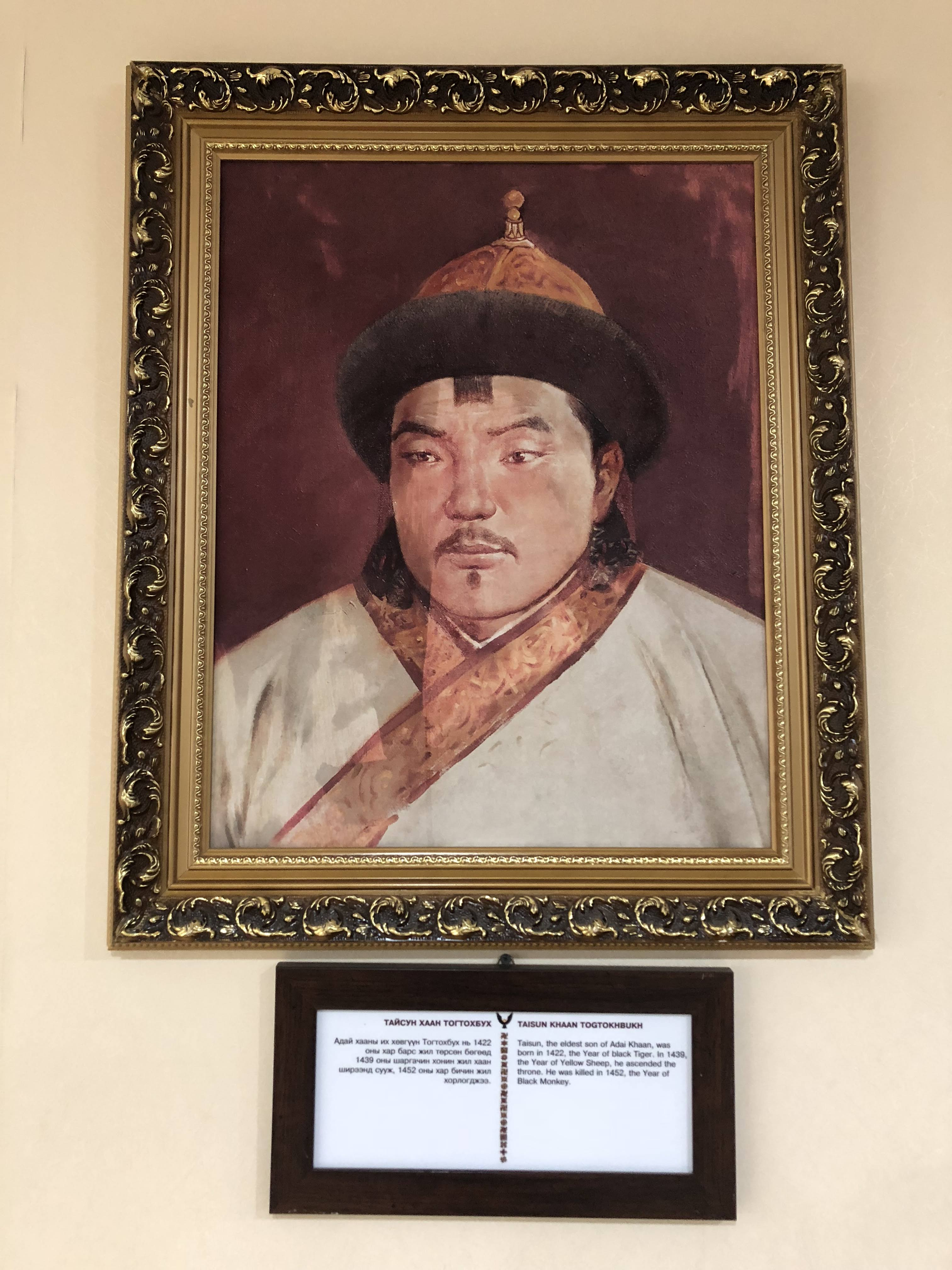

Khagan of the Northern Yuan dynasty
- Reign: 1433–19 January 1452
- Coronation: 1433
- Predecessor: Adai
- Successor: Agbarjin
- Born: 1416
- Died: 1452 (aged 35–36); Khentii, Outer Mongolia
- Spouse: A daughter of Toghon Taishi; Altagana; Samar taifu
Names
- Toghtoa Bukha (Toγtoγa Buqa)
- House: Borjigin
- Dynasty: Northern Yuan
- Father: Ajai

Taisun Khan (Mongolian script:ᠳᠠᠶᠢᠰᠤᠩ Mongolian: Тайсун Хаан; Chinese: 岱總汗), born Toghtoa Bukha (Chinese: 脫脫不花), (1416–1452) was a khagan of the Northern Yuan dynasty, reigning from 1433 to 1452. Under his nominal rule, the Oirats successfully reunited the Mongol tribes and threatened the Ming dynasty to their south for the first time since the Battle of Kherlen in 1409.

== Early life ==
After the previous khan Oyiradai's death in 1425, an internecine war lasting several years broke out among the Oirats under Mahamud (Bahamu, Batula) and western Mongol clans led by Gulichi's family. Meanwhile, the central and eastern Mongol clans proclaimed Adai Khan as the Great Khan shortly after Oyiradai's death in 1425.

Toghtoa Bukha was the eldest son of Ajai who was a posthumous birth of Elbeg Khan (d.1399) and Öljeitü the Beauty. Toghtoa Bukha had two younger brothers, Agbarjin and Manduul. While wandering with his brothers in western Mongolia, Toghtoa Bukha met Mahamud's son and successor, Toghan Taishi of the Four Oirats. The latter married him to his daughter and wanted to use him as pawn. The Oirats crowned Toghtoa Bukha as their own khagan in 1433. This resulted in half a decade of simultaneous existence of two khans supported by opposing Mongol clans.

== Reign ==
Toghtoa Bukha Khan was an ambitious leader who aspired to gain real power and regaining the former glory of the Yuan dynasty. His ambitions inevitably lead to a conflict of interests with powerful Oirat nobles. Although the Oirats shared the same ambition of recovering the glory of Genghis Khan with the new khan, they were well aware of the fractured nature of the Mongol tribes. To buy time before being able to unite them, they first needed to make peace with the Ming dynasty. The Oirats were careful not to enrage the Ming by not officially proclaiming the Yuan and thereby obtained help from the Ming court in defeating the Khorchin. Adai Khan of the Khorchin was killed in 1438.

In 1439 Toghan installed Toghtoa Bukha as leader of the eastern Mongols under the title of Bogd Khagan Taisun of the Northern Yuan before the eight white yurts of Genghis Khan. Taisun Khan felt that the Ming was already weak enough to be dismissed, and openly proclaimed the Yuan dynasty with himself as Taisun (Taizong; 太宗), a move supported by most Mongols except the Oirats, who felt more time was needed to consolidate their gains. Fortunately, the Ming were indeed too weak to strike into the Mongol heartland like the deceased Yongle Emperor had done in the past. Ming showed its disapproval by calling Taisun Khan of the Northern Yuan instead of Taizong (太宗) of the Great Yuan.

After Toghan died, Taisun Khan made Toghan's son Esen Taishi a taishi, and his younger brother Agbarjin a jinong.

During the reign of Taisun Khan, Esen Taishi subjugated the Jurchens in Manchuria, the Kara Del kingdom around Hami City, and the Uriankhais (Tuvans) in Siberia.

== Conflict with Ming dynasty ==
Despite his ambitions, Taisun Khan was still far more inclined towards peaceful relations with the Ming dynasty than his commander Esen. He kept a friendly relationship with the Ming court. His taishi, Esen, was even more ambitious and wanted to restore the glory of the Mongol Empire in name and territory. Esen first directed his attention to the Hami Oasis where the Ming ally, Borjigin prince descended from Chagatai Khan, ruled. Repeated raids and threats by Esen forced him to surrender in 1448.

Esen then attacked the Gansu region where the Mongol satellite states of the Ming, known collectively as the Three Guards, were located. The Fuyu guard was forced to flee, and Esen appointed his own governor in the area. Taisun Khan personally led the attack on the Taining guard. After that, Esen also plundered the Doyin Uriankhai guard, forcing them to surrender. With the submission of the Three Guards, the revived Yuan dynasty became a direct threat to Ming.

When the Ming refused the Mongols their request to allow additional Mongol envoys to China and a Chinese princess, Esen decided to invade the Ming. Taisun Khan was apprehensive of this and did not support Esen at first. However, he was induced to lead the easternmost force of Uriankhais to Liaodong in 1449. He besieged the city and ravaged its outskirts for 40 days while Esen crushed the Ming armies en route to Beijing.

After defeating the Ming army during the Tumu Crisis and capturing the Zhengtong Emperor the Mongols returned north. Taisun Khan treated the captured emperor kindly. Upon realizing that the Ming would not pay a ransom for the captured emperor, the Zhengtong Emperor was returned in 1450.

== Decline ==
Taisun Khan's consort, the elder sister of Esen, attempted to persuade the khan to make his sister's son the designated heir. The request was denied, causing Taisun and Esen to go to war in 1451. Esen promised Taisun Khan's brother, Agbarjin, the title of khan instead. Esen and Agbarjin besieged Karakorum where Taisun Khan was located. Because most of the eastern Mongols deserted to the Oirats, the Khan's troops were defeated in Turfan and he fled towards the Khentii Khan mountains and the Kherlen River with a few of his entourage. Taisun Khan was killed in 1452 by his former father-in-law, Tsabdan, while fleeing. Tsabdan later defected to Esen.

== Wives and children ==
His known wives and children included:

- An Oirat princess, daughter of Toghan taishi. She bore a son named Abdan.
- Altagana of the Khorlad tribe. The Khan and her son was Molon (Mulan).
- Samar taifu who bore Markörgis.

== See also ==
- List of khans of the Northern Yuan dynasty

Taisun Khan House of Borjigin Died: 1433-1452
Regnal titles
Preceded by Adai Khan	Khagan of the Northern Yuan dynasty 1433–1452	Succeeded by Agbarjin
