= Mandukhai =

Mandukhai Khatan ᠮᠠᠨᠳᠤᠬᠠᠢ ᠰᠡᠴᠡᠨ ᠬᠠᠲᠤᠨ
- Khatun of the Mongols
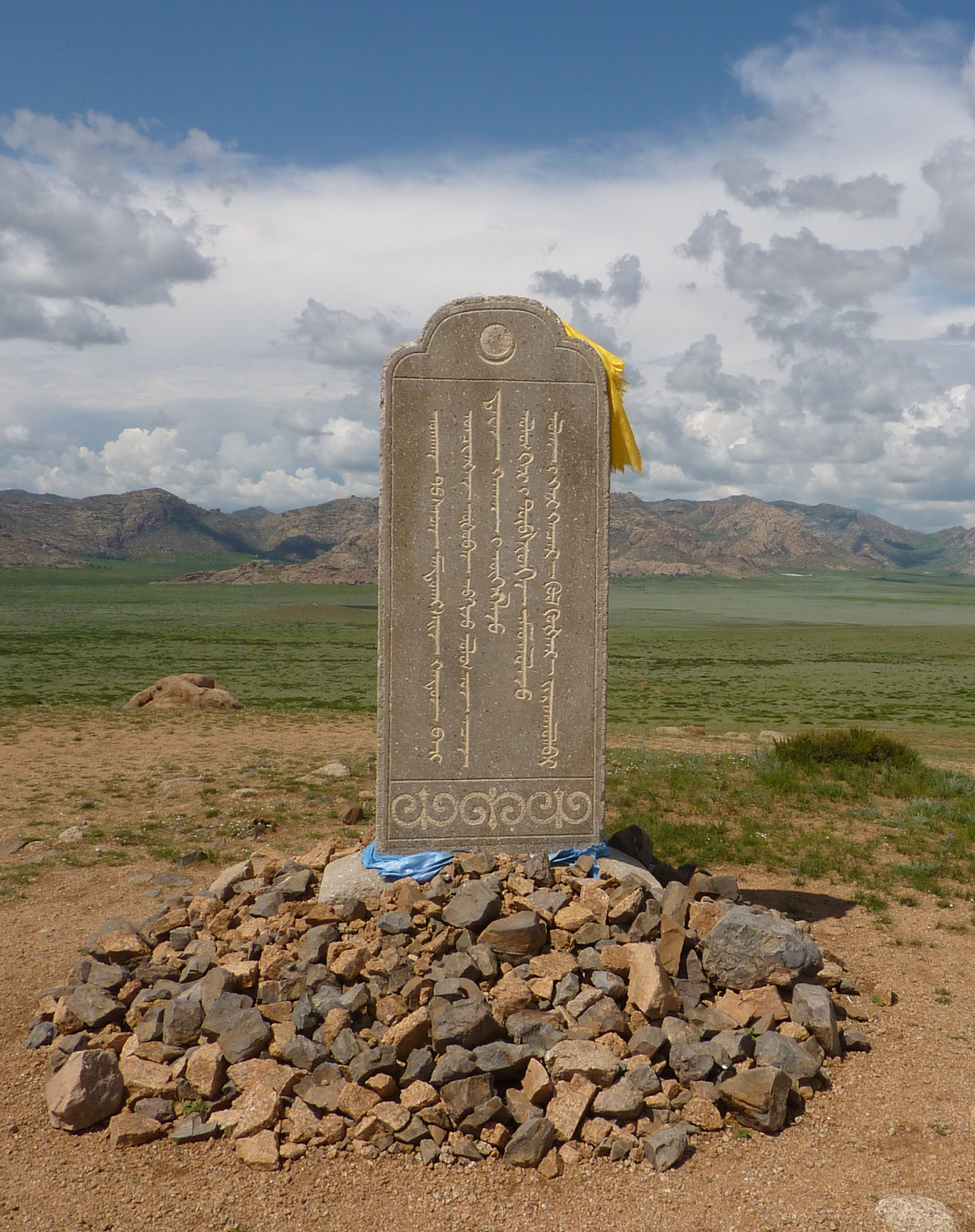
- A stele dedicated to Mandukhai in Khogno Khan National Park, Mongolia.
- Born: c. 1449; Mongolia
- Died: 1510; Mongolia
- Khagan: Manduul Khan; Dayan Khan
- Issue: Turbolad Ulusbolud; Arsubolud; Barsbolud; Töröltu; Ochirbolad Alchubolud
- House: Engud
- Dynasty: Northern Yuan
- Father: Chorosbai chingsang

Queen Mandukhai (/ˌmændʊˈxaɪ/; Mongolian: Мандухай хатан, IPA: [mantʊ̆χɛ́ː χátʰə̆ɴ]), also fully known as Wise Queen Mandukhai (Мандухай сэцэн хатан; c. 1449 – 1510), was a queen of the Northern Yuan. With her second husband Batmunkh Dayan Khan, she helped reunite the warring Mongols.

== Early life ==
Mandukhai was the only daughter of Chororsbai-Tumur, chingsang (grand councillor) of the Ongud Mongols in eastern Mongolia. Her family were aristocrats. In 1464 at the age of sixteen, Mandukhai was married to Manduul Khan, who ruled the Northern Yuan from 1473 to 1479. Mandukhai began to take precedence over Yungen Qabar-tu, the khan's childless first wife. Most sources report that Manduul Khan had no children, although two names are sometimes mentioned as daughters of Mandukhai. Based on their ages, it is possible they were in fact relatives of Manduul Khan, rather than daughters, and may have been cared for by Mandukhai.

In approximately 1478 or 1479, Manduul Khan died under uncertain circumstances. He had no clear heir, leaving several Mongol princes struggling to succeed him as the Khan. His senior wife, Yeke Qabar-tu, disappeared, her fate unknown.

Mandukhai brought from hiding and adopted the seven-year-old orphan Batumunkh, son of the late Bayan Mongkhe Jonon, a direct descendant of Genghis Khan and part of the Altan Urug, who had also been killed by Esmel (Ismail). As Batumunkh was the last living descendant of Genghis Khan, Mandukhai had him proclaimed Dayan Khan, and she rejected the marriage offer by Unubold, a powerful noble. However, Unubold, himself a descendant of Hasar, a younger brother of Genghis Khan, remained loyal to Mandukhai and the child Khan.

== Khatun of Northern Yuan ==
With command over the Mongols, Mandukhai made war with the Oirats and defeated them. Her stunning victory over the Oirats brought back great reputation of the Borjigins and united Mongolia for the first time in more than one hundred years. According to the Yellow Chronicle of the Oirat, a history of the Oirats, Mandukhai imposed the following symbolic laws upon the Oirats in order to mark her dominance over them:

- Oirats could not wear helmets with crests more than two fingers long;
- They could not refer to their ger, or yurt, as an ordon, meaning palace;
- They had to kneel in the presence of a khan.

The Yellow Chronicle also reports that the Oirats were prohibited to eat meat with knives after Mandukhai's conquest. Anthropologist Jack Weatherford considered such a prohibition unlikely to have been an actual law. He suggested that after the conquest, Mandukhai may have temporarily confiscated the weapons of the Oirats, including their knives. They would have had to tear at their meat with their teeth until they were permitted to carry weapons and knives again.

When Batumunkh turned nineteen, she married him and retained her control over the Mongols. The Oirats again rebelled and raided the Eastern Mongols. Mandukhai led the great army against them. She defeated several Ming dynasty attacks and protected the Northern Yuan, she wore the helmet and the sword and fought with the Ming soldiers. She was pregnant, but still fought and delivered twin boys during a long battle. The Western Mongols were subdued once again.

From 1480, Dayan Khan and Mandukhai increased the pressure on the Ming territory because they closed the border trade and killed a Northern Yuan envoy. To contain her, the Ming rapidly expanded the Great Wall. She reoccupied Ordos area and stationed soldiers there to keep watch on the Ming. She reenthroned Dayan Khan at the Eight White Yurts in Ordos but they had to flee a Ming attack. Mandukhai with Dayan Khan went to the Kherlen River in 1501 though her husband continued raids on the Ming dynasty.

Mandukhai died by 1510. According to the most credible sources, Mandukhai died of natural causes, although there are legends that say she was killed by a Ming double agent or by one of her husband's concubines. The film Queen Mandukhai the Wise suggests that she was killed by the Mongol general Esmel (Ismail) who was a Ming spy. Esmel betrayed the Mongols and co-operated with the Ming army in order to attack and take over the Mongols.

However, none of these stories consists of credible sources. As with Genghis Khan and other Great Khans, it seems that her grave was never found.

== Family ==
Mandukhai married Manduul Khan and Dayan Khan.

1. Manduul Khan
  1. Unknown Daughter
  2. Unknown Daughter
2. Dayan Khan
  1. Ulusbold
  2. Turbold
  3. Barsbolod sain alag khagan
  4. Arusbold
  5. Alchubold
  6. Ochirbold
  7. Albold
  8. Töröltu gunju

== Later Life ==
Mandukhai managed to keep Dayan Khan in power as a descendant of Genghis Khan, and she defeated the Oirats. Both feats have contributed to the legends which formed about her life.

She left seven sons and three daughters. All the later khans and nobles of the Mongols are her descendants, including Altan Khan and Ligden Khan.

== In Culture and Fiction ==
Mandukhai is well respected among modern Mongols in State of Mongolia as well as Inner Mongolia, Autonomous Region of China. The Mongolian writer Sh. Natsagdorj published the best-selling novel "Mandukhai Setsen" (Mongolian: Мандухай сэцэн хатан) in 1981, which was later republished in 2013. Based on this novel, Mongolia released a four-part movie directed by B. Baljinnyam, in 1987-1988. The music of the film was created by Natsagiin Jantsannorov, one of the most famous Mongolian composers and musicologists.

Mandukhai's life is also fictionalized in the historical fiction Fractured Empire Saga, by Starr Z. Davies, published 2021-2022, a four-book series: Daughter of the Yellow Dragon, Lords of the Black Banner, Mother of the Blue Wolf, Empress of the Jade Realm.

Mandukhai is also the protagonist of the historical novel Manduchai - Die letzte Kriegerkönigin, written by German author Tanja Kinkel in 2014. The novel tells her life and how she became the Khatun of her people.

Mandukhai is one of the major Mongol queens described in The Secret History of the Mongol Queens, a 2011 book by the American historian and anthropologist Jack Weatherford.
