= Dayan Khan =

Great Khan of the Northern Yuan dynasty from 1480 to 1517

Dayan Khan 達延汗 ᠳᠠᠶᠠᠨ ᠬᠠᠭᠠᠨ
- Khagan of all Mongols
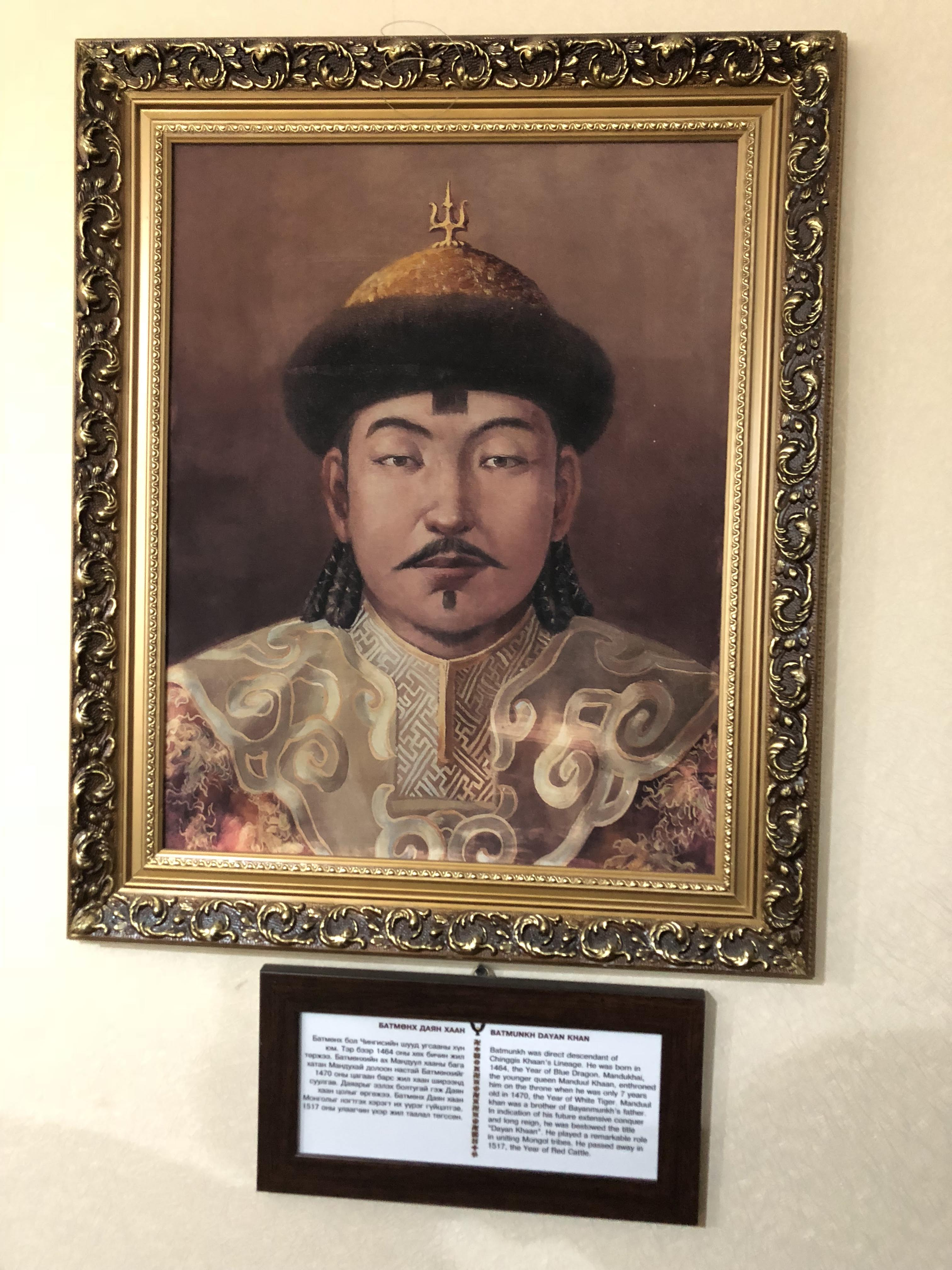

Khagan of the Northern Yuan dynasty
- Reign: 1480–1517 (1543?)
- Coronation: 1480
- Predecessor: Manduul Khan
- Successor: Bars Bolud Jinong
- Born: 1474(1472?); Mongolian Plateau
- Died: 1517 (1543?); Mongolian Plateau
- Consort: Mandukhai; Jimisgene; Guushi (Khusei)
Names
- Batumöngke (Батмөнх)
- House: Borjigin
- Dynasty: Northern Yuan
- Father: Bayanmunh
- Mother: Shihir Taihu

Dayan Khan (/ˈdaɪən xɑːn/; Mongolian: Даян Хаан [ˈtajɴ ˈχaːɴ]), born Batumöngke (Middle Mongol: [b̥atʰʊ̆møŋkʰĕ], Modern Mongol: [paʰtmɵŋx]; Chinese: 巴圖蒙克 Bātúméngkè; 1474–1517) was a khagan of the Northern Yuan dynasty, reigning from 1480 to 1517. During his rule, he reunited the Mongols under Chinggisid supremacy. His reigning title, "Dayan", means "the whole" or "long lasting" in Mongolian language as he was the longest reigning khagan of the unified Mongols.

Dayan Khan's victory at Dalan Tergin reunified the Mongols and solidified their identity as Chinggisid people. His decision to divide the six tumens of Eastern Mongolia as fiefs for his sons created decentralized but stable Borjigin rule over the Mongolian Plateau for a century.

== Childhood ==
Batumongke was the son of Bayanmongke (Bayanmunh) (fl. 1470–1480) the Bolkhu jinong (or crown prince/viceroy) of the Borjigin clan and Shiker Taiko (Shihir Taihu) of the Uriyangkhai in Mongolia. His paternal grandmother, Sechen, was a daughter of Esen Tayshi of the Oirats. Although Bolkhu and his family suffered through life's darkest hours during the reign of Esen and the internal conflict of the Northern Yuan dynasty, they were welcomed by his uncle (brother) Manduul Khan (r. 1465–1467) soon after his coronation.

Batumongke's father Bayanmongke and his uncle Manduul had come to blows due to warlords' convictions, and Bayanmongke had fled and been murdered. Manduul's taishi Ismayil (also known as Isama) then took his wife Shikher and properties. In order to save Batumongke's life Shiker gave her child to the Bakhay family to nurse him. However, Temur-Qadag of the Tangud (already Mongolicized) took the child from Bakhay. Because of his Borjigin blood, Batumongke was well taken care of by the Mongol commoners and minor nobles.

At the sudden death of Manduul Khan in 1467, Batumongke was five years old. Later he was adopted by Mandukhai Khatun, the widow of Manduul Khan. When Mandukhai's loyalists brought back Batumongke, he was suffering echinococcosis. Mandukhai had him treated and the boy recovered soon.

== Reign ==
The Northern Yuan dynasty and Turco-Mongol residual states and domains by the 15th century

As a direct descendant of Kublai Khan (r. 1260–1294), Mandukhai had him ascend to the throne at the age of eight at the Royal shrine kept by the Chakhar and he became known by the title "Dayan Khan". When he was aged nineteen, she married him, and retained great influence over court and military. They reunified the Mongol retainers of the former eastern region of the Mongol Empire. The Oirats were defeated by the military skill of Mandukhai and control was reclaimed over the Eastern Mongols. Batumongke and his queen Mandukhai led Mongol armies in 1483 against Ismayil Taishi who after the imperial victory over him fled to Hami where he was killed by other Muslims and Turco-Mongols. Dayan Khan's mother Shiker was brought back and given the title taikhu (empress dowager). However, she did not live long enough after that. The imperial power was supported by Unubold (Naybolad), the descendant of Hasar who was the brother of Genghis Khan, and the tribes ruled by descendants of Genghis Khan's brothers were allied. Most of the Four Oirats remaining in Mongolia surrendered and provided troops. Only Khoosai of the Tumed rejected Dayan Khan's supremacy but was defeated in turn.

The most important achievement of the couple was their defeat of the war-like Oirats who had previously revolted against the rule of the Borjigin Emperors since the 14th century. By 1495, Batumongke won the Three Guards (Doyin Uriankhai, Ujiyed and Fuyu guard), tributaries of the Ming dynasty, and had them incorporated into his Six tumens.

=== Early conflicts with Ming dynasty ===
Mongol raids on Ming borderlands became virtually constant. Under Dayan Khan they reached a new level of organization. Dayan Khan intended to maintain good relations with Ming dynasty at first. His envoys were sent to sign open-trade contract with gifts, but one of them was killed by the Ming court, so he launched military expeditions into the Ming China. Dayan Khan as a mature ruler had no interest in joining the Ming's tribute system.

Dayan Khan allied with the Monggoljins under Toloogen and Khooshai of Ordos. With Dayan Khan and Mandukhai's movement to the Eight white yurts in Ordos in 1500, they launched a massive attack on Ningxia and conquered some lands. At first their invasion caused trouble to the Ming Chinese but Yu, the officer of the Ming Dynasty, and his commander Wang ambushed the Mongols and organized an unexpectedly vigorous counter attack in an attempt to capture Dayan Khan the next year. Barely escaping the Ming attack, Dayan Khan relocated to the Kherlen River, yet large-scale raids all along the frontier continued through 1507.

=== The unrest of the Right Wing ===
A delegation from the Three Right Wing Tumens (Ordos, Tümed and Yöngshiyebü) invited Dayan Khan to rule them. Because Iburai Taishi (also known as Ibrahim), an Uighur adventurer or an Oirat/Kharchin warlord and Mandulai dominated the area, the three Tumens were seeking a more agreeable arrangement. In a skirmish raid on one of the rebel groups, the imperial army killed Ibrahim’s younger brother. Dayan Khan dispatched to the Tumens his sons Ulusbaikh (Ulusbold) and Barsubolad Sainalag. As Ulusbold was being enthroned as jinong, he was killed in a riot and Barsubolad escaped. In revenge, Dayan Khan attacked the Three Right Wing Tumens with his three Left Wing Tumens (Chakhar, Khalkha and Uriankhai), the Khorchin and the Abagha. Because a large group of the Uriankhai Tumen defected to Iburai, Dayan Khan was first defeated at Turgen Stream at present-day Tumed territory.

In 1510, he crushed the Three Right Wing Tumens and killed Mandulai, the Ordos elder. Iburai fled to Kokenuur (Qinghai) where he remained active to 1533. Dayan Khan dispersed the rebel Uriankhais among other 5 tumens. Instead of enslaving the Right Wing Tumens, Dayan Khan had Barsubolad enthroned as jinong (晉王) in 1513, abolishing old titles like taishi (太師) and chingsang (丞相) of the Yuan dynasty. He exempted his soldiers from imposts and made them Darqan. According to an ancient Mongolian source, the Mongols were again peaceful thereafter thanks to the policy of Dayan Khan and his khatun Maudukhai.

With defeats of Iburai and Ismayil, Dayan and Mandukhai could remove the power of descendants of the Alans, the Kypchaks and the Hami Muslim warlords from the Northern Yuan court in the Mongolian Plateau.

=== Later conflicts with the Ming dynasty ===
In 1513 Dayan Khan began building fortified camps in the Xuanhua and Datong areas, from which he staged increasingly dangerous incursions with up to fifteen thousand cavalry even closer to Beijing. At the same time, internal succession struggles were tearing apart the principality of Hami. The Turpan Khanate conquered Hami in 1513. The high point of Mongol power came in 1517, when Dayan Khan moved on Beijing itself although the Chinese led by Zhengde Emperor held him off at the Battle of Yingzhou. He continued to threaten the capital until 1526.

Dayan Khan and Mandukhai's nation now stretched from the Siberian taiga and Lake Baikal in the north, across the Gobi, to the edge of the Yellow River and south of it into the Ordos. The lands extended from the forests of Manchuria in the East past the Altai Mountains and out onto the steppes of Central Asia.

=== Reform ===
He reorganized the Eastern Mongols into 6 tumens (literally "ten thousand") as follows:

- Left Wing: Khalkha, Chahar and Uriankhai
- Right Wing: Ordos, Tümed and Yöngshiyebü (including Asud and Kharchin)

They functioned both as military units and as tribal administrative bodies. Northern Khalkha people and Uriyankhan were attached to the South Khalkha of eastern Inner Mongolia and Doyin Uriyangkhan of the Three Guards, respectively. After the failed rebellion of the northern Uriankhai people, they were divided in 1538 and mostly annexed by the northern Khalkha. Under Dayan Khan or his successors, the Eastern Mongols compelled the Barga to surrender. However, his decision to divide the Six tumens to his sons, or taijis, and local tabunangs, sons-in-law of the taijis, created a decentralized system of Borjigin rule that secured domestic peace and outward expansion for a century. Despite this decentralization there was a remarkable concord within the Dayan Khanid aristocracy and intra-Chinggisid civil war remained unknown until the reign of Ligden Khan (1604–34).

== In fiction ==
Dayan's early life is also fictionalized in books three and four of the historical fiction Fractured Empire Saga, by Starr Z. Davies, published 2021-2022, a four-book series: Daughter of the Yellow Dragon, Lords of the Black Banner, Mother of the Blue Wolf, Empress of the Jade Realm.

Dayan Khan is an important background character in the historical novel "Manduchai", written by German Author Tanja Kinkel in 2014.

== Family ==
Dayan Khan married Mandukhai the Wise, Guushi and Jimsgene.

- Parents:
  - Bayanmunh
  - Shihir Taihu
- Wives and children:
1. Mandukhai
  1. Turbolad
  2. Ulusbold
  3. Arsubolad
  4. Barsubolad
  5. Töröltu
  6. Ochirbolad
  7. Alchubolad
  8. Albolad
2. Jimsgene
  1. Gersenji
  2. Gerbolad
3. Guushi
  1. Gert
  2. Chintaiji

His sons were made tribal chiefs. Many princes in the Mongolian Plateau were his descendants such as Altan Khan and Ligden Khan. Dayan Khan and his successor Khagans led the Chahar tumen directly. The Chinese chroniclers of the Ming dynasty considered him a Holy Emperor who restored former glory of the Mongol Empire. There is much that is uncertain about Dayan Khan's life after the death of Mandukhai. The dates of death range from 1517 until 1543.

== See also ==
- List of khans of the Northern Yuan dynasty
- Yuan dynasty

Dayan Khan House of Borjigin Died: 1480–1517/1543
Regnal titles
| Preceded by Manduul Khan | Khagan of the Northern Yuan dynasty 1480 – 1517 | Succeeded by Bars Bolud Jinong |
