= Esen Taishi =

Oirat taishi (r. 1438/1453–1454)

Esen ᠡᠰᠡᠨ
- Khagan of the Mongols
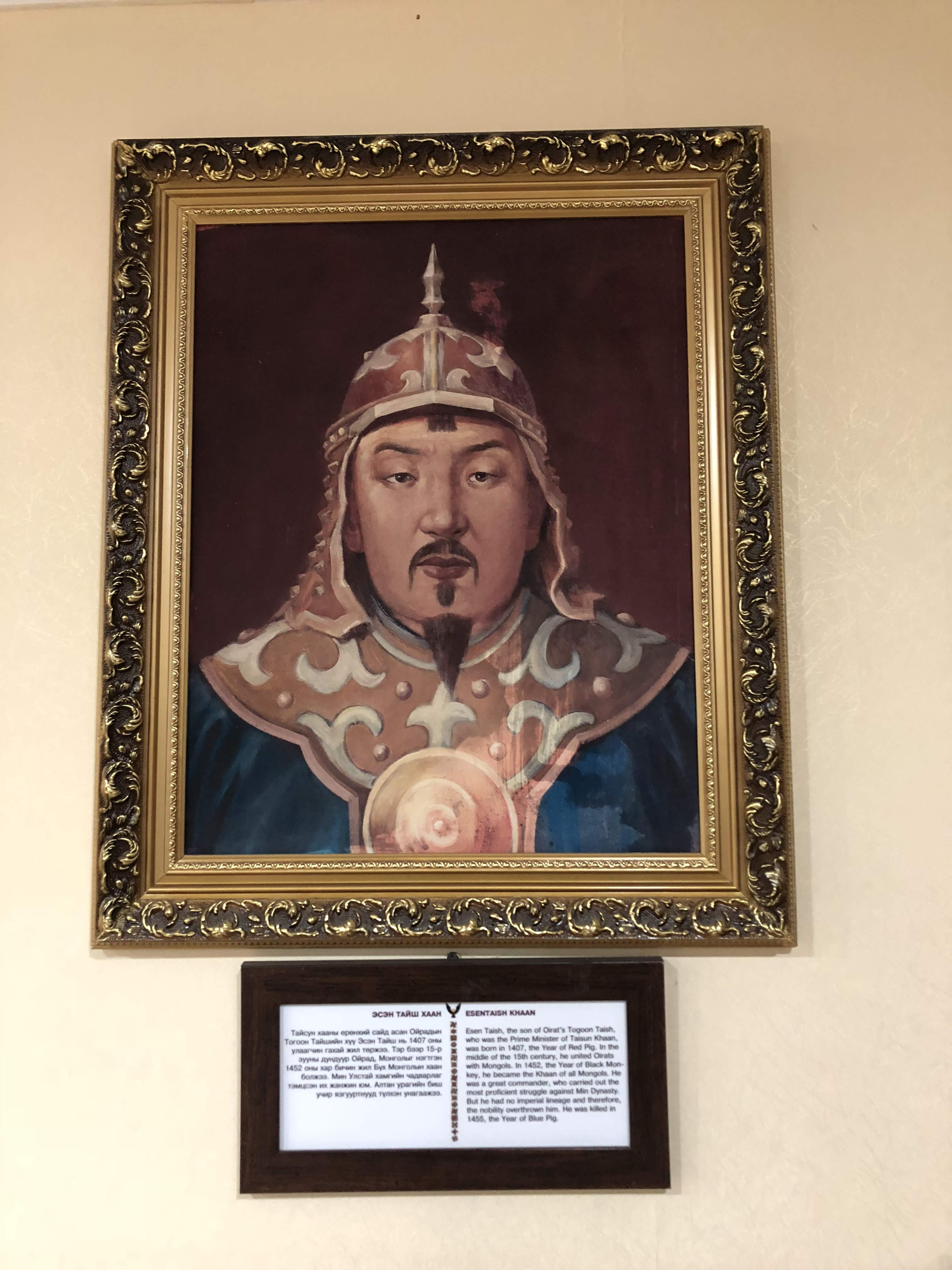

Khagan of the Northern Yuan dynasty
- Reign: 1453–1454
- Predecessor: Agbarjin
- Successor: Markörgis Khan
- Died: 1455
Era name and dates
- Tianyuan (添元): 1453–1454
Regnal name
- Tian-sheng Khagan of the Great Yuan
- House: Choros
- Dynasty: Northern Yuan
- Father: Toghon

Esen (Note: Mongolian: Эсэн; Mongol script: ᠡᠰᠡᠨ; Chinese: 也先; pinyin: Yě Xiān) (died 1455) was an Oirat taishi and khagan of the Northern Yuan dynasty between 1453 and 1454.

Esen, the son of Toghon taishi, distinguished himself in wars against Moghulistan, twice capturing its khan. After his father's death in 1438, he became the de facto ruler of the Mongols, despite being formally subordinate to Taisun Khan of the Northern Yuan. During the 1440s, he seized Hami on the Silk Road, controlled Gansu's Mongol principalities, subdued the Uriankhai, and unified Mongolia.

His relations with Ming China were marked by restricted trade and rising tensions. The Ming limited exchanges to tribute, and in 1449, reduced the goods granted to Esen's envoys. This led to war, partly due to the Ming refusal to grant an imperial princess to Esen's son. In July 1449, Esen led a major invasion of China. Ming forces under Emperor Yingzong were decisively defeated at the Battle of Tumu Fortress, and the Emperor was captured. The Ming enthroned his brother, the Jingtai Emperor, and Esen was unable to capitalize on his victory, making peace in 1450 and releasing Yingzong.

In the early 1450s, Esen eliminated Taisun during a succession conflict, briefly installed and killed a puppet khan, and then proclaimed himself khan. His later designation of his son, Amasanj, as the taishi provoked a rebellion led by his subordinate Alag, in which Esen was defeated and soon killed.

== Life under Toghon ==
Esen was the son of the Oirat taishi, Toghon, of the Choros clan. His military abilities were evident during his father's lifetime. In the 1420s, he led three successful campaigns against Eastern Moghulistan, capturing its ruler Uwais Khan twice. During this time, he also expanded Oirat influence to Beshbalik. In the 1430s, Esen accompanied his father in campaigns against the Khalkha taishi Arughtai, resulting in Arughtai's death in 1434. This victory allowed Toghon to install his own candidate, Taisun, as a puppet Great Khan of the Northern Yuan. To solidify this alliance, Taisun was married to Esen's elder sister. Toghon himself held the title of taishi (also known as taiji), derived from the Chinese term taishi (太師), meaning "grand preceptor" or "heir apparent." Among the Mongols, this title was considered the highest rank below that of khan, a position that Toghon could not attain as he was not from the lineage of Genghis Khan. In European languages, the title taishi is often translated as "chief" or "prime minister".

== First conquests ==
After Toghon's death in 1438, Esen inherited his title of taishi and began pressuring the "guards" (衛; wei) along the northwestern frontier of Ming China. In 1443, 3000 Oirats attacked Hami, an important oasis that acknowledged Ming suzerainty, and captured the local prince's mother and wife. Esen attempted to persuade the prince to visit the Oirat camp and accept their overlordship, but the prince refused. The Ming court strongly protested against the Oirat raid, and Esen, not wanting to challenge China at that time, eventually released the noble captives. In 1445, he once again attacked Hami and captured the prince's mother and wife, inviting him to visit. Despite assuring the Ming authorities that he would not give in to Esen's demands, the prince of Hami eventually traveled to Oirat territory in 1448 and remained there for an extended period as a member of the Oirat leader's retinue.

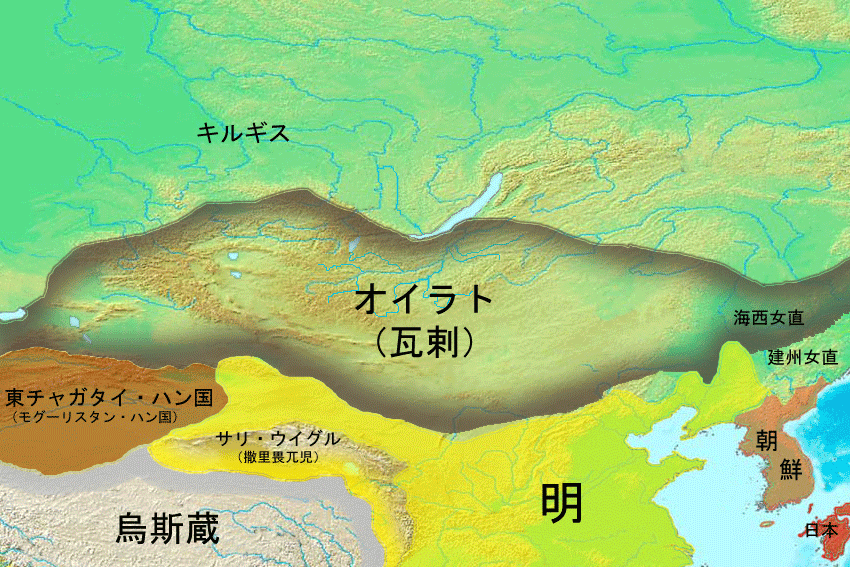
The territory of the Oirats at its greatest extent under Esen

In 1443, Esen attempted to compel the leaders of the Mongol tribes of Shazhou and Qizhin guards in western Gansu to form an alliance through intermarriage. Negotiations were delayed as the leaders sought support from the court in Beijing, warning them of Esen's intentions. Despite this warning, the Ming authorities took no action, which only encouraged Esen to continue with his plans. In 1445, he forced the leaders of Shazhou and Qizhin to accept Mongol titles and established a "provincial government of Gansu" solidifying his intention to take control of the region. The following year, in 1446, the majority of the Shazhou tribe was intimidated and chose to flee. Most of them sought refuge in China, while a small number joined Esen. On the other hand, the Qizhin tribe remained in their territory despite the threat from the Oirats. They repeatedly requested permission to abandon their land and seek refuge in China, but Emperor Yingzong of Ming rejected their appeals. He assured them that if they "kept a watchful eye on the situation in the west and in case of an impending invasion warned the Ming generals [they] would receive help in time and be quite safe". In order to persuade them to stay, the Emperor also provided them with necessary supplies such as grain. The majority of the Qizhin tribe remained in their territory until 1454, when Esen once again attempted to force them into an alliance.

Esen pursued an aggressive policy in the northeast, forming an alliance with three Uriankhai guards—Daning, Duoyan, and Fuyu—in the early 1440s. This alliance was solidified through his marriage to the daughter of the chieftain of one of these guards, Daning. These Uriankhai guards served as spies for Esen within China. However, when the Ming launched a punitive expedition against the Uriankhai in 1444 due to repeated raids, Esen did not provide assistance and instead took advantage of their weakened state to plunder their territory. By 1447, Esen had conquered the Daning and Duoyan guards and forced the Fuyu to migrate. This final act of aggression gave Esen control over a vast territory, stretching from present-day Xinjiang to Korea.

== War with Ming China ==
The Ming court was concerned about Esen's territorial gains, but they were also troubled by issues related to "tribute" and trade. Traditionally, the Ming viewed all foreign rulers as "vassals" subordinate to the emperor and accepted "tribute" from them. In reality, the "gifts" given by the emperor often exceeded the value of the "tribute" offered, especially during times of Chinese weakness. This effectively served as a way to buy security. Under the guise of exchanging "tribute" for "gifts", international trade was actually taking place. Before Esen's rule, most Oirat "tributary" missions (which were actually commercial missions) consisted of only around one hundred men. In 1442, a mission of 2,302 men was sent, followed by one of 1,867 men in 1444, and another with over 2,000 men in the winter of 1448–1449. Since the Ming were not only paying for the horses brought as "tribute", but also had to provide food, lodging, and gifts for the "envoys", this increase in numbers resulted in a forced rise in payments for the Ming court and became a significant burden on their finances. On the other hand, the mistreatment of Esen's emissaries and the small gifts they received allowed him to claim that his people were being cheated by Chinese officials and merchants in commercial transactions. He also accused the court of dishonestly lowering the price paid for his horses. In the early 1440s, Grand Secretary Yang Shiqi warned of potential Oirat raids and urged the Emperor to provide the frontier armies with more horses. Many border officials also requested additional troops and supplies. The Ming court only attempted to drive a wedge between Esen and Taisun, failing to realize that the latter had no real power to threaten Esen's authority as taishi. The Ming either underestimated or were unaware of Esen's growing strength. Even when deserters reported that Esen was gathering his forces for an attack, the Ming court simply sent an envoy to ask if this was true.

Two incidents transformed these tensions into open conflict. The first occurred in 1448 when an Oirat "tributary" mission arrived in Beijing. In an attempt to receive more gifts, the members of the mission falsely claimed to have over three thousand men. This deception was discovered and the Ming court, particularly the influential eunuch Wang Zhen, became furious. The mission was only granted one fifth of the gifts they had demanded. The second incident involved Chinese interpreters who, without authorization, promised Esen that his son could marry a member of the imperial family in order to repair the previous insult. However, when Esen sent the customary betrothal gifts to Beijing, the court, unaware of the interpreters' actions, rejected the proposed marriage alliance. According to some accounts, this second affront was the final straw that led Esen to declare war.

=== Tumu Crisis ===
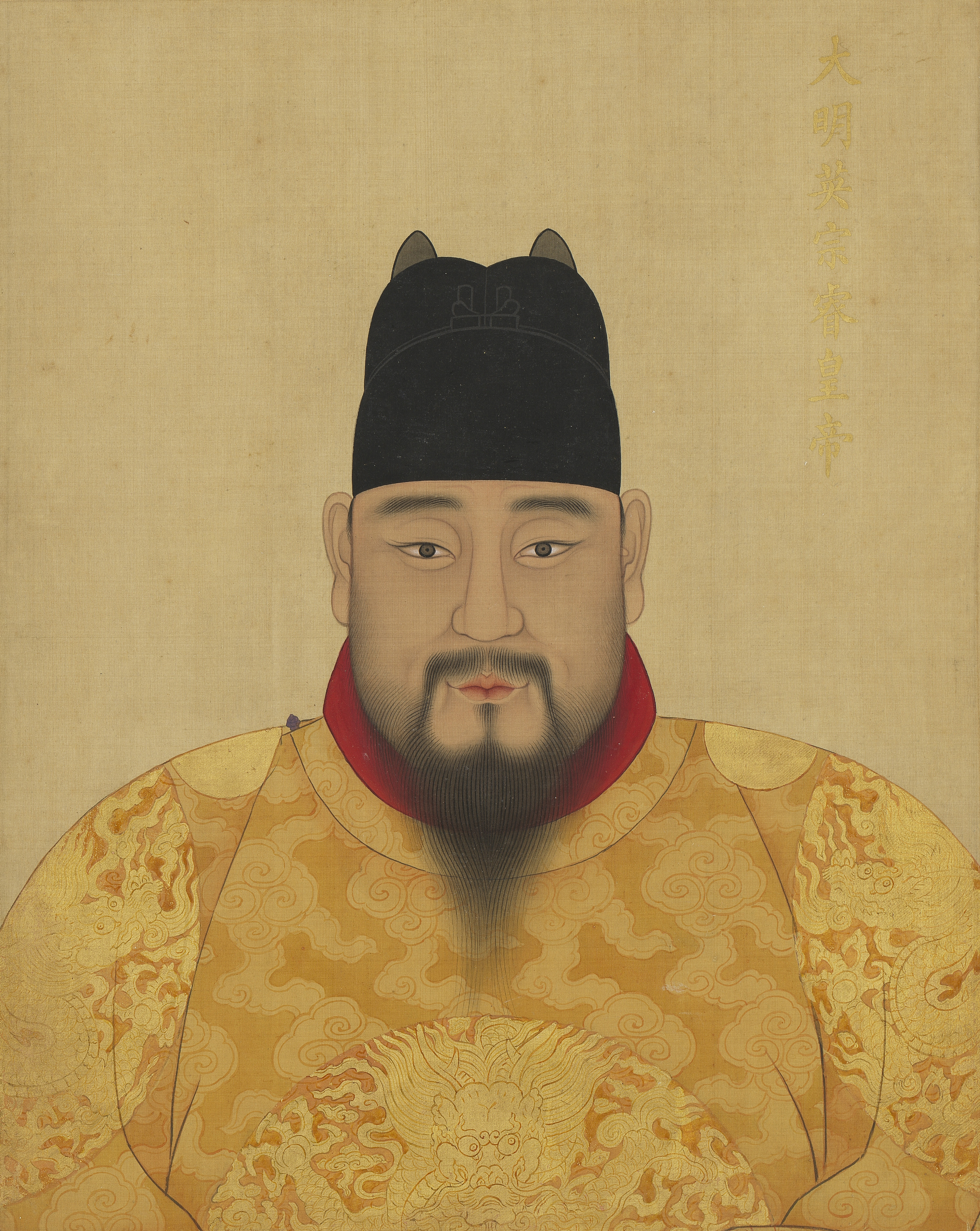
Emperor Yingzong of Ming, captured by Esen during the Tumu Crisis

In July 1449, Esen launched a large-scale invasion of China. He dispatched Taisun, leading the Uriankhai, to conduct a raid towards the Liaodong Peninsula. He also ordered his subordinate, Alag chingsang (grand councillor), to lay siege to Xuanfu. Esen himself advanced towards Datong, another key point along the Great Wall. On 3 August, Esen's forces destroyed a poorly supplied and badly commanded Chinese army near Yanghe, north of Datong. They then moved towards the city itself. Meanwhile, Emperor Yingzong, encouraged by Wang Zhen, decided to personally lead an army of reportedly half a million men against the Oirats. He reached Datong on 18 August, but upon realizing the defeat at Yanghe and the famine afflicting his army, he ordered a retreat just two days later. The Ming forces withdrew along the same devastated route as before, becoming increasingly disorganized as they marched. On 30 August, the Oirats destroyed the Ming rear guard and a relief force of forty thousand cavalry. The following day, the Ming encamped around the Tumu postal station, where they lacked sufficient water. Wang Zhen refused to proceed to the nearby fortified town of Huailai, as doing so would have required abandoning his personal baggage. On the morning of 1 September, the Mongols attacked and massacred the Emperor's troops, who were already deprived of food and water. Many of the highest officials of the empire, including Wang Zhen, were killed. When Esen arrived, the Emperor was found "sitting on a carpet with unruffled calm, without the slightest trace of emotion on his face, while the bodies of his slaughtered bodyguards lay scattered around him".

The Oirats were surprised by the scale of their victory. Instead of striking at Beijing, Esen withdrew with the captured Emperor Yingzong to Datong. He then demanded a ransom of gold and silk from the commander of the besieged garrison, and was able to obtain thirty thousand liang of silver. The commander attempt to rescue the Emperor was unsuccessful. Esen then learned that power in Beijing had been taken over by Emperor Yingzong's younger brother, the Jingtai Emperor. Realizing that this reduced the value of his hostage, Esen tried to have him restored to the throne. He then advanced towards Beijing, but the new Ming Minister of War, Yu Qian, had already mobilized reserves and calmed the panic. When Esen demanded a ransom of one million liang of gold, he was met with refusal. After a brief siege from 27 to 30 October, Esen was forced to withdraw with his army of seventy thousand, facing a threefold numerical superiority.

The Ming attempted to detach other Mongol leaders from Esen, particularly Taisun and Alag, by opening negotiations with them. They also offered a reward of fifty thousand liang of silver and ten thousand of gold, along with an official title, for Esen's assassination. In May 1450, they refused to receive an Oirat delegation that sought to discuss the terms of the emperor's release. Yu declared that this so-called peace delegation was a mere ploy, and that Esen intended to either attack China or demand exorbitant amounts of money. This refusal was also motivated by the Jingtai Emperor's fear that his returning brother would pose a threat to his rule. He viewed negotiations for his release with reluctance. Esen treated the captive emperor well, hosting banquets in his honor and even attempting to arrange a marriage between him and his own sister. Esen also sent multiple envoys offering to resume "tributary" payments and negotiate the emperor's release. These efforts were somewhat successful, as Jingtai dispatched two missions to Esen in the second half of 1450, led by Li Shi and Yang Shan. The letters they carried made no mention of the captive emperor. In September, Yang, who had previously served Emperor Yingzong, took the Emperor back to China on his own initiative, assuring Esen that "tributary" (commercial) relations would be restored.

== Khanship, rebellion and death ==
After Emperor Yingzong was released, Esen maintained a positive relationship with the Ming until his death. The Ming court's need for horses was so great that they were willing to meet the high demands of Oirat "tributary" envoys. Esen's focus then shifted to his relationship with Taisun. In the winter of 1450, they worked together to attack the Jurchens and raid into what is now Heilongjiang, but tensions arose between them over the choice of Taisun's successor. Esen wanted a candidate that Taisun did not approve of, causing a rift between them. Taisun then formed an alliance with the Ming and Alag in an attempt to overthrow Oirat control over the Khalkhas. This alliance was initially successful, but suffered a major setback when Taisun's own brother, Agbarjin, defected to the Oirats in the winter of 1451. Esen defeated Taisun in the Turpan Basin and the Khan fled to the northeast. Taisun was killed by a local chieftain, likely from the Uriankhai tribe, in early 1452. Agbarjin was proclaimed khan by Esen but was soon murdered by him. In 1453, Esen declared himself the Great Khan of the Northern Yuan.

In his letter to the Ming court in that year, Esen used the title "Tian-sheng Khagan of the Great Yuan" (大元天盛大可汗, Tengri Bogd Khan). Esen was not a descendant of Genghis Khan and his self-proclamation as Great Khan ultimately led to his downfall due to a Mongol revolt. According to Chinese accounts, this revolt was fueled by Esen's lavish lifestyle and excessive drinking. Additionally, he refused to grant the title of taishi to Alag, who considered himself a more suitable candidate, and instead granted it to his son, Amasanj. Esen was easily defeated by a man named Bukun, whose father he had previously ordered to be killed. It was at Bukun's hands that Esen met his death, leading to the collapse of the Oirat state.

== See also ==
- List of khans of the Northern Yuan dynasty
- Four Oirat
- Tumu Crisis
- Kara Del

== Notes ==
Esen Taishi House of Choros (Чорос) Died: 1455
Regnal titles
Preceded by Agbarjin	Khagan of the Northern Yuan dynasty 1453–1454	Succeeded by Markörgis Khan
Preceded by Toghon	Taishi of the Oirats; 1438–1454	Succeeded by Amasanj
