= Manduul Khan =

Manduul Мандуул хаан ᠮᠠᠨᠳ‍ᠤᠭᠤᠯ
- Khagan of the Mongols
- Reign: 1475–1479
- Coronation: 1475
- Predecessor: Molon Khan
- Successor: Dayan Khan
- Born: 1438
- Died: 1479 (aged 40–41)
Full name
- Given name: Manduulun (Manduyul, Manduyulun)
- House: Borjigin
- Dynasty: Northern Yuan

Manduul (also spelled Manduuluu, Manduyul or Manduyulun; Mongolian: Мандуул; Chinese: 滿都魯), (1438–1479) was a khagan of the Northern Yuan dynasty, reigning from 1475 to 1479. He was the younger half-brother of Taisun Khan.

== Early life ==
After the death of his nephew Molon Khan, the position remain vacant for nearly a decade as warring Mongol clans fought each other for dominance. Manduul Khan was married to Yeke Qabar-tu, daughter of the Turfan-based warlord Beg-Arslan, sometime between 1463 and 1465. The two disliked each other, and their marriage produced no children. In 1464, he also married Mandukhai, who was only sixteen years old at the time. It was not until 1475 that Manduul Khan was finally crowned as the new khan. Manduul is the earliest Mongol chief known to have actually headed the Chakhar myriarchy.

== Reign ==
During his short rule, Manduul Khan successfully strengthened the power of khan and reduced the power of nobles, and paved the way for his adopted son and great-grandnephew Dayan Khan (Batu Möngke) who succeeded him as Manduul Khan had no direct male heirs, and most sources report that he had no children at all.

== In Fiction ==
Manduul's later life is also fictionalized in books one and two of the historical fiction Fractured Empire Saga, by Starr Z. Davies, published 2021-2022, a four-book series: Daughter of the Yellow Dragon, Lords of the Black Banner, Mother of the Blue Wolf, and Empress of the Jade Realm.

He also appears as a character in the historical novel "Manduchai" by German author Tanja Kinkel in 2014.

Manduul Khan was portrayed by Mongolian actor Luvsan-Ochiryn Nyamsüren in the 1988 four-part Mongolian historical film epic Mandukhai Setsen Khatan (Мандухай сэцэн хатан).

== See also ==
- List of khans of the Northern Yuan dynasty

Manduul Khan House of Borjigin Died: 1475-1479
Regnal titles
Preceded by Molon Khan	Khagan of the Northern Yuan dynasty 1475–1479	Succeeded by Dayan Khan
