= Northern Yuan =

Former empire in East Asia

Northern Yuan Great Yuan 大元 Dà Yuán (Chinese) Great Yuan Great Mongol State ᠳᠠᠢ ᠥᠨ ᠶᠡᠬᠡ ᠮᠣᠩᠭᠣᠯ ᠤᠯᠤᠰ Dai Ön Yeke Mongɣol Ulus (Middle Mongol)
- 1368–1635
- Imperial Seal of the Mongols

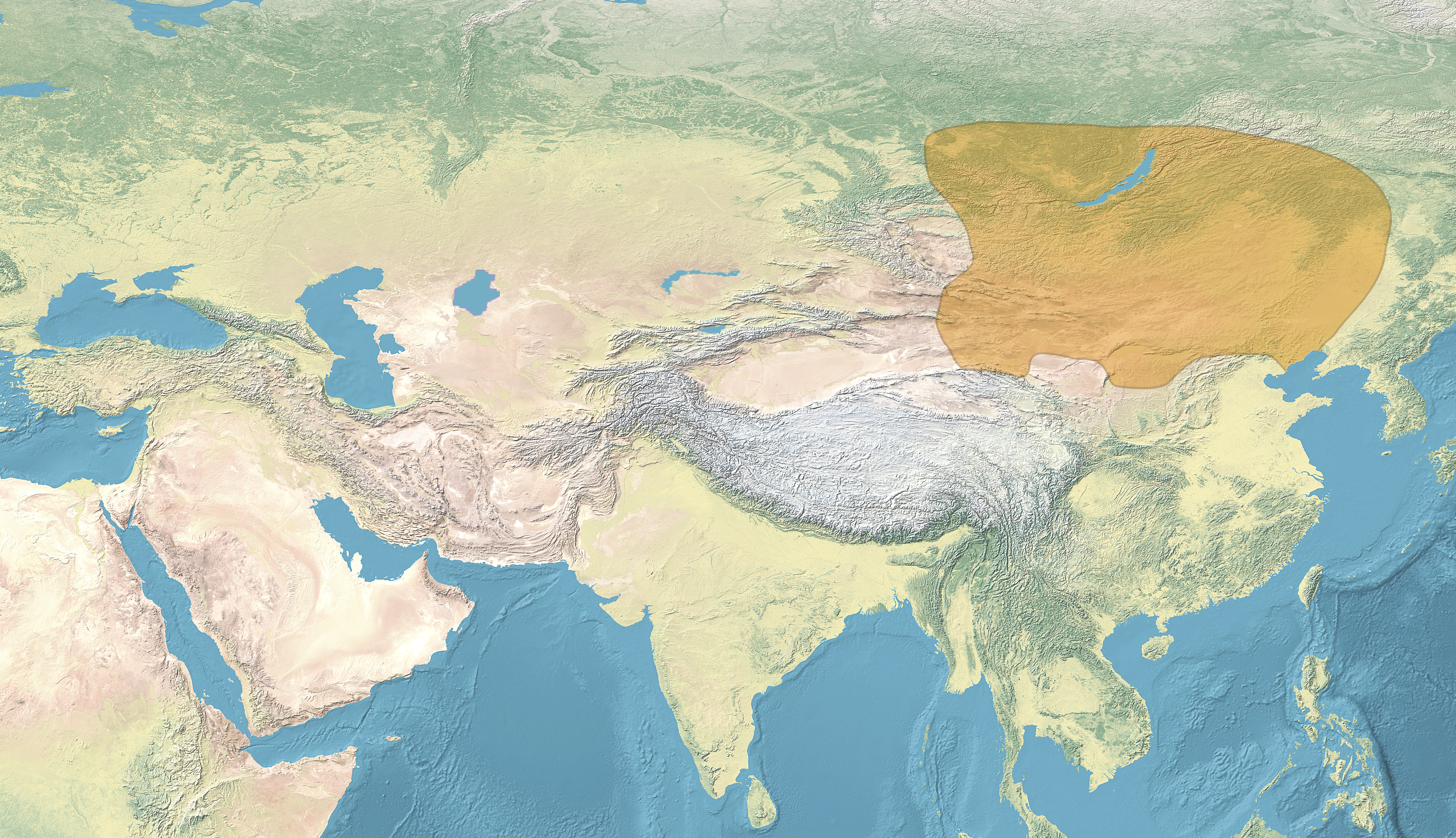
- The Northern Yuan and main polities in Asia c. 1500 CE.
- Capital: 1. Shangdu (1368–1369); 2. Yingchang (1369–1370); 3. Karakorum (1371–1388)
- Common languages: Mongolian, Chinese, Jurchen
- Religion: Tengrism, Buddhism, Islam
- Government: Monarchy
- Khagan
  - 1368–1370: Toghon Temür (first)
  - 1370–1378: Biligtü Khan Ayushiridara
  - 1378–1388: Uskhal Khan Tögüs Temür
  - 1454–1455: Esen Taishi (only non-Borjigin)
  - 1478–1517/1543: Dayan Khan (longest ruling)
  - 1557–1592: Tümen Zasagt Khan
  - 1603–1634: Ligdan Khan
  - 1634–1635: Ejei Khan (last)
- Legislature: Yassa; Customary rules
- Historical era: Late Middle Ages
  - Fall of Dadu to Ming forces: September 1368
  - Death of Uskhal Khan Tögüs Temür: 1388
  - Dayan Khan reunites the Mongol nation: 1483–1510
  - Death of Ligdan Khan: 1634
  - Ejei Khan submits to the Later Jin: 1635

Area
- 1368: 5,000,000 km^{2} (1,900,000 sq mi)
- Currency: Barter, Dirham
Preceded by
Yuan dynasty
Succeeded by
Oirat Confederation
Later Jīn
Qamil
Khalkha Mongols
Mongolia under Qing rule
- Today part of: China; Mongolia; Russia; Kazakhstan

The Northern Yuan was a dynastic state ruled by the Mongol Borjigin clan based in the Mongolian Plateau. It existed as a rump state after the collapse of the Yuan dynasty in 1368 and lasted until its conquest by the Jurchen-led Later Jin dynasty in 1635, which was later renamed as the Qing dynasty. The Northern Yuan dynasty began with the retreat of the Yuan imperial court led by Toghon Temür (Emperor Huizong of Yuan) to the Mongolian steppe. This period featured factional struggles and the often only nominal role of the Great Khan.

Dayan Khan and Mandukhai Khatun reunited most Mongol tribes in the late 15th century. However, the former's distribution of his empire among his sons and relatives as fiefs caused the decentralization of the imperial rule. Despite this decentralization, a remarkable concord continued within the Dayan Khanid aristocracy, and intra-Chinggisid civil war remained unknown until the reign of Ligdan Khan (1604–1634), who saw much of his power weakened in his quarrels with the Mongol tribes and was defeated by the Later Jin dynasty. The last sixty years of this period featured the intensive penetration of Tibetan Buddhism into Mongol society.

The name "Northern Yuan" is a historiographical naming convention for convenience. The dynastic name "Great Yuan" was abandoned by the Jorightu Khan Yesüder in 1388, however certain Mongol leaders continued to evoke the name of Great Yuan on occasion up to the early 17th century.

== Name ==
The regime that existed between 1368 and 1635 is known by various names, including the Northern Yuan (dynasty). The dynastic name of "Great Yuan'" (Chinese: 大元; pinyin: Dà Yuán) was officially used between 1368 and 1388, as was the preceding Yuan dynasty. Following the death of Uskhal Khan Tögüs Temür, the "Great Yuan" dynastic name along with other Han-style imperial titles were abandoned by his successor Jorightu Khan Yesüder; hence, the name "Northern Yuan" is sometimes limited in its usage to referencing only the period between 1368 and 1388. The historiographical term "Northern Yuan" in the English language is derived from the corresponding term "北元" (Běi Yuán) in the Chinese language, in which the prefix "Northern" is used to distinguish between the Yuan dynasty established in 1271 and the regime that existed after 1368. The historiographical name "Northern Yuan" first appeared in the Korean historical text Goryeosa written in Classical Chinese. Some scholars believe that the reign of Dayan Khan whose regnal name "Dayan" came from the Chinese term "大元" (Dà Yuán; lit. "Great Yuan"). Furthermore, there is evidence to suggest that Taisun Khan, Esen Taishi, Manduul Khan, and Ligdan Khan had also used the "Great Yuan" dynastic name and Han-style imperial titles during their rule up to the early 17th century.

In English, the term "Northern Yuan (dynasty)" is generally used to cover the entire period from 1368 to 1635 for historiographical purpose. Apart from "Great Yuan" (before 1388 and during the rule of certain leaders like Esen Taishi), the Mongols called their regime "Yeke Mongghol Ulus", the Mongolian term meaning the "Great Mongol State". It is also referred to as "Post-Imperial Mongolia", the "Mongol(ian) Khaganate", or the "Mongol(ian) Khanate" in some modern sources, although most of these English terms can also refer to the Mongol Empire or the Yuan dynasty in the 13th and the 14th centuries.

In chronicles written in the Mongolian language, this period is also known as "The Forty and the Four" (Döchin Dörben), meaning forty tümen of Eastern Mongols and four tümen of Western Mongols. (Note: In the 17th century the memory of the Yuan had faded among the Mongols, although editors of chronicles described in the 18th century mentioned clearly that Kublai was the founder of the Yuan dynasty.) Mongolian historiography also uses the term "Period of political disunion", "Period of small khagans", "Mongolia's period of political disruption" and "Mongolia's 14th–17th century", etc. The Chinese Ming dynasty called them "Tatar" (Chinese: 鞑靼; pinyin: Dádá) and "Wala" (Oirats, Chinese: 瓦剌; pinyin: Wǎlà) after the Mongols were divided into eastern and western parts.

== History ==
=== Origin ===
The Northern Yuan dynasty was the remnant of the Yuan dynasty (1271–1368) founded by Kublai Khan. After eliminating the Song dynasty in 1279, the Yuan dynasty ruled all of China proper for about a century. Even prior to the Yuan dynasty, the Mongols had ruled Northern China for more than 40 years, since the time they conquered the Jurchen-led Jin dynasty in 1234.

Yuan rule in China proper began to collapse in 1344 when the Yellow River flooded and changed course, causing widespread droughts, flooding, and making the Grand Canal impassable. In 1351, the Red Turban Rebellion erupted in the Huai River valley, which saw the rise of Zhu Yuanzhang, a Han peasant, who eventually established the Ming dynasty (1368–1644) in southern China. In 1368, a Ming army advanced on the Yuan capital Khanbaliq or Dadu (present-day Beijing).

=== Retreat to Mongolian Steppe (1368–1388) ===
Ming dynasty and the Northern Yuan in the early 15th century. The Mongols lost some lands in China proper after the Ming defeated Tögüs Temür in 1388.

Toghon Temür (r. 1333–1370), the last ruler of the Yuan, fled north to Shangdu (located in present-day Inner Mongolia) from Dadu upon the approach of Ming forces. He tried to regain Dadu but failed and died in Yingchang (located in present-day Inner Mongolia) two years later (1370). Yingchang was seized by the Ming shortly after his death.

The Mongols retreated to Karakorum in the Mongol heartland after the fall of Yingchang in 1370, where they maintained the official dynastic title "Great Yuan", known retroactively as the "Northern Yuan". The Ming army pursued the Yuan remnants into the Mongolian steppe in 1372 but was defeated by Biligtü Khan Ayushiridara (r. 1370–1378) and his general Köke Temür (d. 1375). In 1375, Naghachu, a Mongol official of Biligtu Khan in Liaoyang province invaded Liaodong with the aim of restoring Mongol power in China proper. Although he continued to hold southern Manchuria, Naghachu eventually surrendered to the Ming dynasty in 1387–88. The Yuan loyalists under the Kublaid prince Basalawarmi (the Prince of Liang) in Yunnan and Guizhou were also defeated and killed by the Ming earlier in 1381–82.

In 1380, the Ming invaded Northern Yuan and sacked Karakorum, although they were eventually forced to withdraw. Around 70,000 Mongol captives were taken. In 1387, the Ming defeated the Uriankhai Mongols, and in the following year they achieved decisive victory around the Buir Lake against Uskhal Khan Tögüs Temür. The defeat of Uskhal Khan effectively shattered Yuan power in the steppes and allowed the Western Oirat Mongols to rise and become the kingmakers of the Northern Yuan realm.

The Genghisid (Major descendants of Kublai) rulers of the Northern Yuan also buttressed their claim on China, and held tenaciously to the title of Emperor (or Great Khan) of the Great Yuan (Dai Yuwan Khaan, or 大元可汗) to resist the Ming, who had by this time become the true rulers of China proper. According to the traditional Chinese political orthodoxy, there could be only one legitimate dynasty whose rulers were blessed by Heaven to rule as Emperor of China (see Mandate of Heaven), so the Ming also denied the Yuan remnants' legitimacy as emperors of China, although the Ming did consider the previous Yuan which it had succeeded to be a legitimate dynasty.

=== Oirat domination (1388–1478) ===
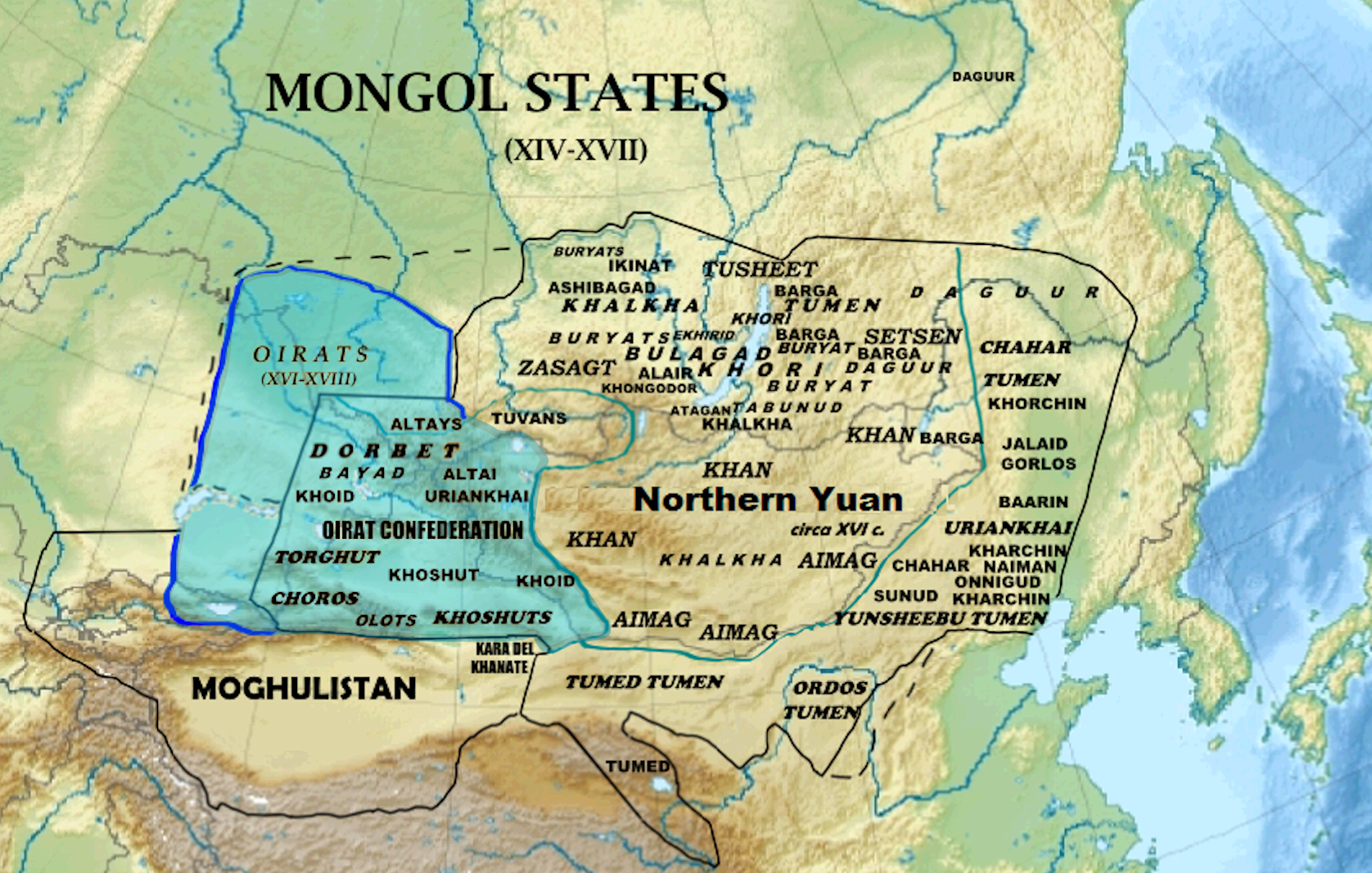
Location of the Oirats

In 1388, the Mongol throne was taken over by Jorightu Khan Yesüder, a descendant of Ariq Böke (Tolui's son), with the support of the Oirats. He abolished the Han-style title of the former Yuan dynasty. In the following year, one of Uskhal Khan's subjects, Gunashiri, a descendant of Chagatai Khan, founded his own small state called Kara Del in Hami.

The following century saw a succession of Genghisid rulers, many of whom were mere figureheads put on the throne by those warlords who happened to be the most powerful. From the end of the 14th century there appear designations such as "period of small kings" (Бага хаадын үе). On one side stood the Western Mongols and on the other the Eastern Mongols. While the Oirats drew their khans from the descendants of Ariq Böke and other princes, Arugtai of the Asud supported the old Yuan khans of Kublaid descent. The House of Ogedei also briefly attempted to reunite the Mongols under their rule.

The Mongols eventually split into three main groups: the Oirats in the west, the Uriankhai in northeast, and the Khorchin between the two. The Uriankhai surrendered to the Ming dynasty in the 1390s. The Ming divided them into the Three Guards: Doyin, Tai'nin and Fuyu.

Mongol relations with the Ming dynasty consisted of sporadic bursts of conflict intermingled with periods of peaceful relations and border trade. The Oirat-backed Örüg Temür Khan (Gulichi) was defeated by Elbeg Khan's son Öljei Temür Khan (Bunyashiri, r. 1408–1412), the protégé of Tamerlane (d. 1405), in 1403. Most of the Mongol noblemen under Arugtai chingsang sided with Öljei Temur. The Yongle Emperor (r. 1402–1424) issued Öljei Temür an ultimatum demanding his acceptance of tributary relations to the Ming dynasty. Öljei Temur refused, resulting in the Ming dynasty conducting several campaigns against the Mongols. In 1409, a Ming army of 100,000 entered Mongolia but suffered a defeat against Öljei Temur and Arugtai at the Battle of Kherlen. In the following year, the Yongle Emperor personally led an expedition into Mongolia and defeated the Mongols. After the death of Öljei Temur, the Oirats under their leader Bahamu (Mahmud) (d. 1417) enthroned an Ariq Bökid Delbeg Khan in 1412. Originally the Ming had supported the Oirats in their power struggle with the eastern Mongols, but as the Oirats gained supremacy over them, the Ming withdrew their support.

The Northern Yuan dynasty and Turco-Mongol residual states and domains by the 15th century

By 1422, Arugtai turned hostile again as the Ming did not grant him the trading privileges he wanted, and Yongle campaigned against him in 1422 and 1423. Bahamu's successor Toghan pushed Arugtai east of the Greater Khingan range in 1433. The Oirats killed him in the west of Baotou the next year. Arugtai's ally Adai Khan (r. 1425–1438) made a last stand in Ejin before he was murdered too.

Toghan died in the very year of his victory over Adai. His son Esen Taishi (r. 1438–1454) brought the Oirats to the height of their power. Under his puppet khans, he drove back Moghulistan and crushed the Uriankhai Three Guards, Kara Del and the Jurchens. In 1449 he defeated a 500,000 strong Ming army and captured the Zhengtong Emperor in what came to be known as the Tumu Crisis. However, after this astounding victory, Esen failed to take the Ming capital of Beijing. In the following year a peace was concluded between the two sides and the captive emperor was allowed to return home. After executing the rebellious Tayisung Khan (r. 1433–1453) and his brother Agbarjin in 1453, Esen took the title of not just khan, but also Yuan Emperor. This caused widespread dissent among the Genghisids, and in 1455, a series of revolts resulted in Esen's death. His death started the decline of the Oirats, who would not recover until their rise as the Dzungar Khanate in the 17th century.

From Esen's death to 1481 different warlords of the Kharchin, the Belguteids and Ordos Mongols fought over succession and had their Genghisid khans enthroned. The Mongolian chroniclers call some of them the Uyghurs and they might have had some ties with the Hami oasis. During his reign, Manduulun Khan (1475–1478) effectively won over most of the Mongol warlords before he died in 1478.

=== Restoration (1479–1600) ===
==== Second reunification ====
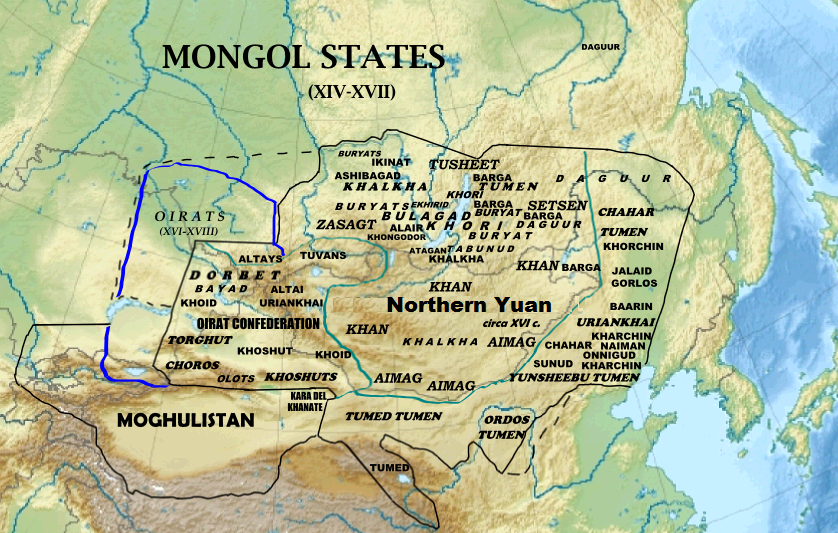
The Northern Yuan in the 15th century

Manduulun's young khatun Mandukhai proclaimed a seven-year-old boy named Batumongke of Genghisid descent as khan. Mandukhai made persistent efforts to bring the various Mongol tribes under control. The new khan took the title Dayan meaning "the whole" or “Great Yuan” (大元; "Da Yuan"). Mandukhai and Dayan Khan defeated the Oirats and the taishis who ruled the Yellow River Mongols. However, one of them killed Dayan Khan's son and revolted when Dayan Khan appointed his son, Ulusbold, as jinong (crown prince) over them. Dayan Khan finally defeated the southwestern Mongols in 1510 with the assistance of his allies, Unebolad wang and the Four Oirats.

From 1495 onward, Dayan exerted pressure on the Ming dynasty, which closed border-trade and killed his envoys. Dayan invaded Ming territory and subjugated the Uriankhai Three Guards, who had previously submitted to the Ming. As a result, the Tümed Mongols ruled in the Ordos region and they gradually extended their domain into northeastern Qinghai. In 1517, Dayan even threatened Beijing itself. Mongol armies raided the Ming dynasty not only in the north but also in the hitherto quiet west. The Ming dynasty lost Kara Del as a protectorate to the Turpan Khanate at the same time. Dayan kept defeating the Ming in battle right up until his death in 1543. At the apogee of Dayan's reign, the Northern Yuan stretched from the Siberian tundra and Lake Baikal in the north, across the Gobi, to the edge of the Yellow River and south of it into the Ordos. The lands extended from the forests of Manchuria in the East past the Altai Mountains and out onto the steppes of Central Asia.

Dayan Khan's reorganization of the Mongols into six Eastern Mongol tümens (literally "ten thousand") and four Oirats tümens had far-reaching effects on the development of Mongol society.

- Left Wing:
  - Khalkha tumen: Northern 7 otog: Jalaid, Besud, Eljigin, Gorlos, Khökhüid (Khukhuid), Khataghin, and later added Uriankhai. Southern 5 otog: Baarin, Jaruud, Bayagud, Ujeed (Uchirad) and Hongirad
  - Chahar tumen: Abaga, Abaganar, Aokhan, Daurs, Durved, Hishigten, Muumyangan, Naiman, Onnigud, Huuchid, Sunud, Uzemchin, and Urad
  - Uriankhai tumen. This tumen was later dissolved.
- Right Wing:
  - Ordos tumen
  - Tümed tümen
  - Yünsheebüü (Yöngshiyebü) tümen (including Asud and Kharchin)
- Four tümen Oirats:
  - Choros, Olots, Durvud, Khoid, Baatud, Torghut, Khoshut, Ur (Ör) Mongol, Barga Mongols and Buryats. The Barga and Buryats later became subject of Khalkha.

The six Eastern Mongol tümens were granted to his 11 sons while the four Oirat tümens were ruled by taishi nobles. His youngest son Gersenji Khongtaiji of the Jalayir became the ruler of the Khalkha Mongols, the largest of the six tümens. The tümens functioned both as military units and as tribal administrative bodies who hoped to receive taijis, descended from Dayan Khan. Northern Khalkha people and Uriyankhan were attached to the South Khalkha of eastern Inner Mongolia and Doyin Uriyangkhan of the Three Guards, respectively. After the rebellion of the northern Uriankhai people, they were conquered in 1538 and mostly annexed by the northern Khalkha. However, his decision to divide the six tumens to his sons, or taijis, and local tabunangs-sons in the law of the taijis created a decentralized system of Borjigin rule that secured domestic peace and outward expansion for a century. Despite this decentralization, there was a remarkable concord within the new Mongol order created by Dayan Khan.

==== Last reunification ====
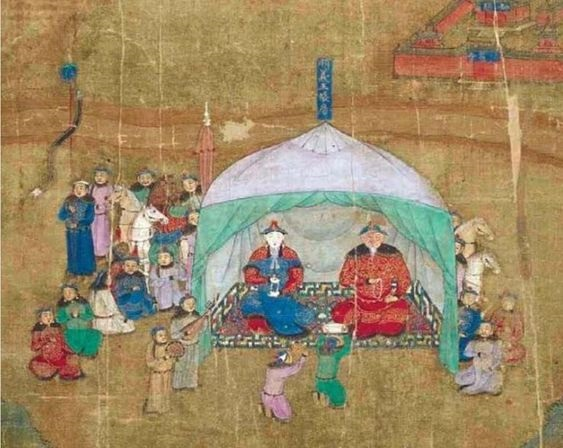
Tent of Altan Khan and Sannangji.

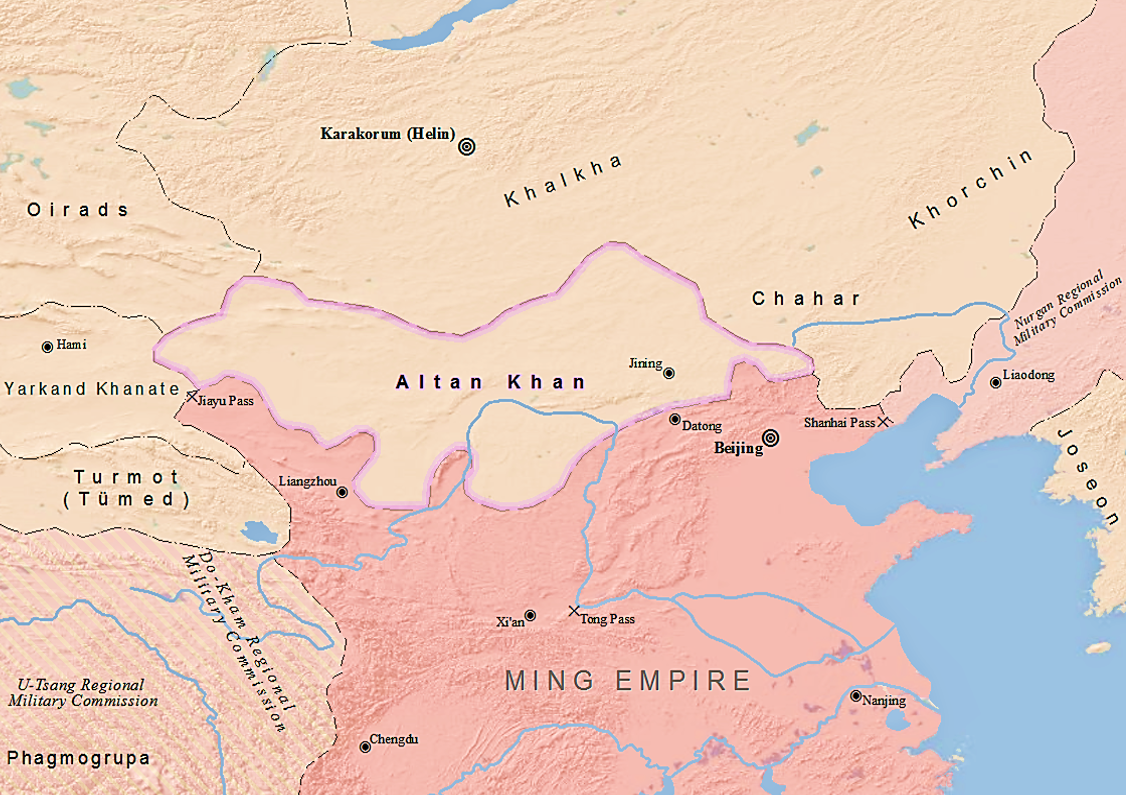
Realm of Altan Khan in 1571

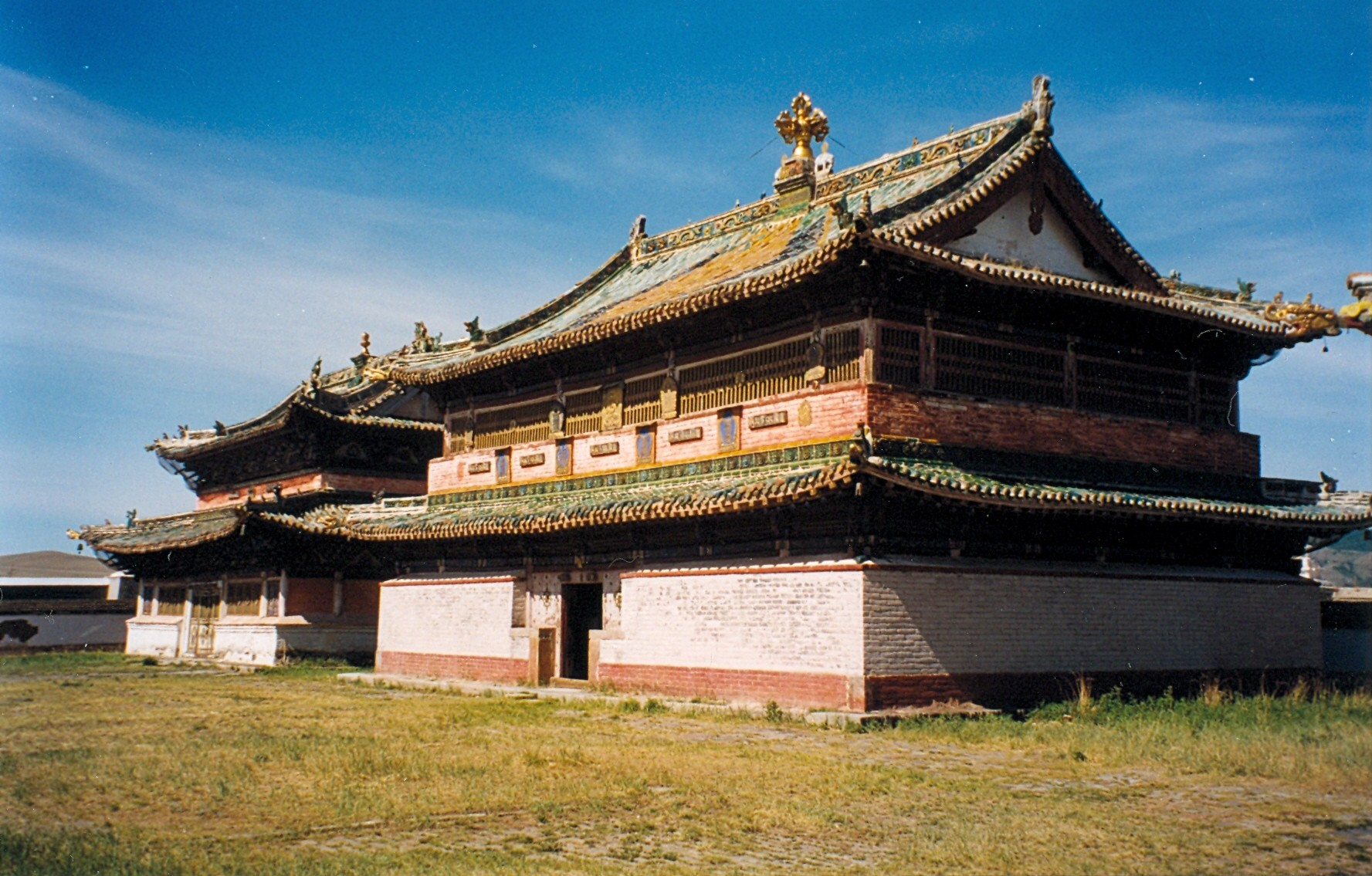
Temple at Erdene Zuu monastery established by Abtai Khan in the Khalkha heartland in the 16th century.

After Dayan Khan's death, the Mongols began falling apart again under the two succeeding khans. By 1540 new regional circles of taijis and local tabunangs (imperial sons-in-law) of the taijis emerged in all the former Dayan Khan's domains. The khagan and the jinong had titular authority over the three right wing tumens. Darayisung Gödeng Khan (r. 1547–1557) had to grant titles of khans to his cousins Altan, ruling the Tumed, and Bayaskhul, ruling the Kharchin.

Under Tümen Jasagtu Khan (r. 1558–92), the realm was unified again with the aid of Altan Khan, Abtai Sain Khan, and Khutughtai Sechen Khongtaiji of Ordos. Jasagtu defeated the Uriankhai and Daghur Mongols and subjugated the Jurchens to the east. Abtai and Sechen brought many of the Oirat tribes under their domination. Altan conquered large parts of Qinghai and left one of his sons in charge there. Jasagtu also tried to unify the Mongols under a new code of law, written in the old Mongol script derived from the Uyghur script. A series of smallpox epidemics and lack of trade forced the Mongols to repeatedly plunder the districts of China. In 1571 the Ming opened trade with the three Right Wing Tumens.

By the end of the 16th century, the Uriankhai Three Guards had lost their existence as a distinct group. Their Fuyu was absorbed by the Khorchin after they had moved to the Nonni River. Two other, Doyin and Tai'nin, were absorbed by the Five Khalkhas.

==== Conversion to Buddhism ====
Although Yuan emperors had previously adopted Buddhism, most Mongols ignored it and remained shamanist in their belief. From 1575, a large-scale conversion to Tibetan Buddhism in the Right Wing Tumens occurred. Jasagtu appointed a Tibetan Buddhist chaplain of the Karmapa order and agreed that Buddhism would henceforth become the state religion of Mongolia. In 1577, Altan and Sechen received the 3rd Dalai Lama, which started the conversion of Tumed and Ordos Mongols to Buddhism. Soon after the Oirats also adopted Buddhism. Numerous Tibetan lamas entered Mongolia to proselytize.

=== Fall (1600–1635) ===
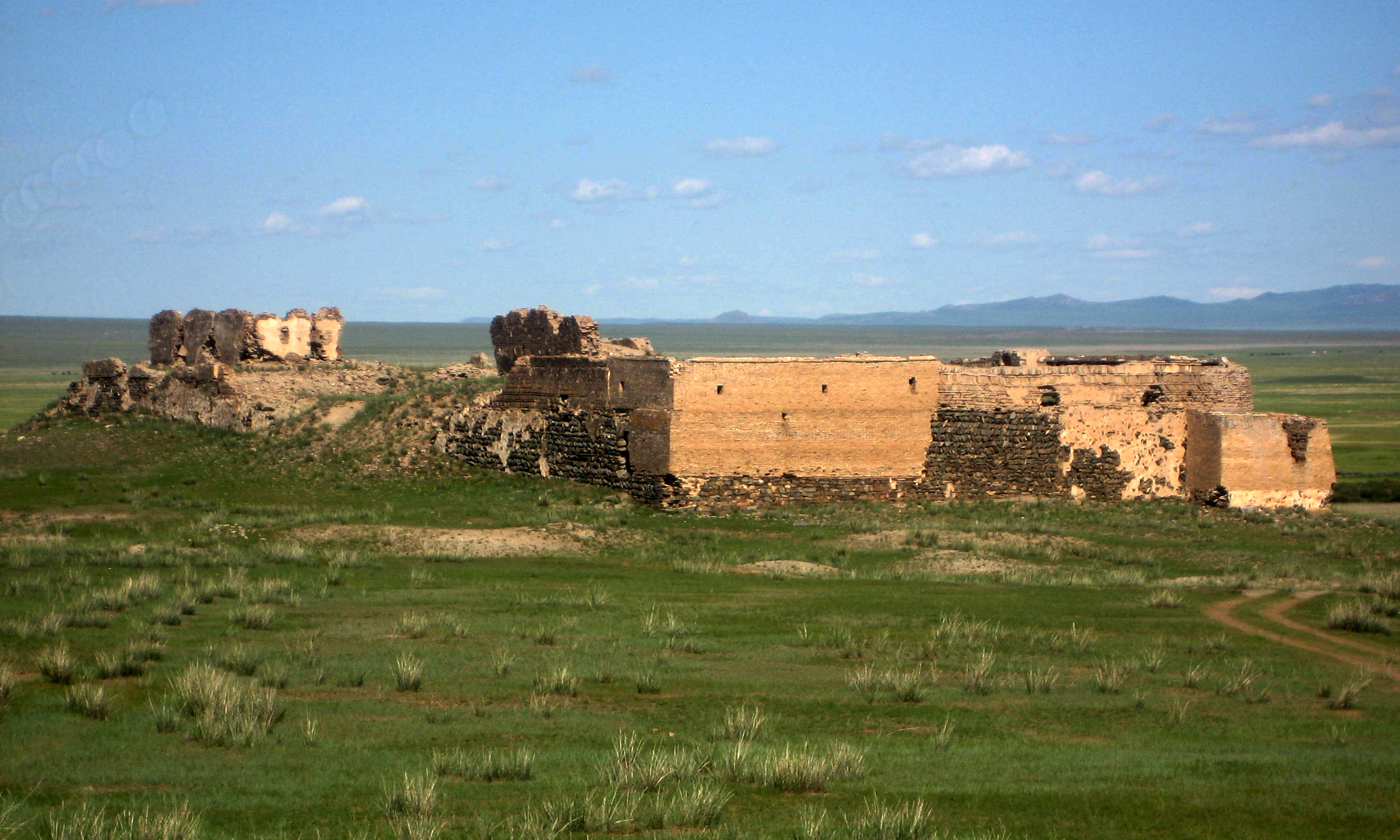
The White House of Tsogt Taij (White Castle) was built in 1601.

By the reign of Ligdan Khan (r. 1604–1634), the Eastern Mongol tumens had ceased to function as a unified entity. Ligdan only controlled the Chahar tumen and the Khalkha and Oirat Mongols no longer obeyed his authority. Ligdan built a new capital in Chahar land known as Chaghan Baishin (White House) and promoted the building of Buddhist monasteries, translation of Tibetan literature, and trade with the Ming dynasty.

In 1616, the Jurchens rose to the forefront of East Asian powers under the reign of Nurhaci. Although sharing many similar characteristics with the Mongols, the Jurchens were not nomads, but tribal people who had adopted Chinese agricultural practices. Nurhaci had ambitions to conquer the Ming dynasty and sought allies in the Khorchin Mongols, subjects of Ligdan. The princes of Khorchin, Jarud, and southern Khalkha Mongols made a formal alliance with the Jurchens from 1612 to 1624.

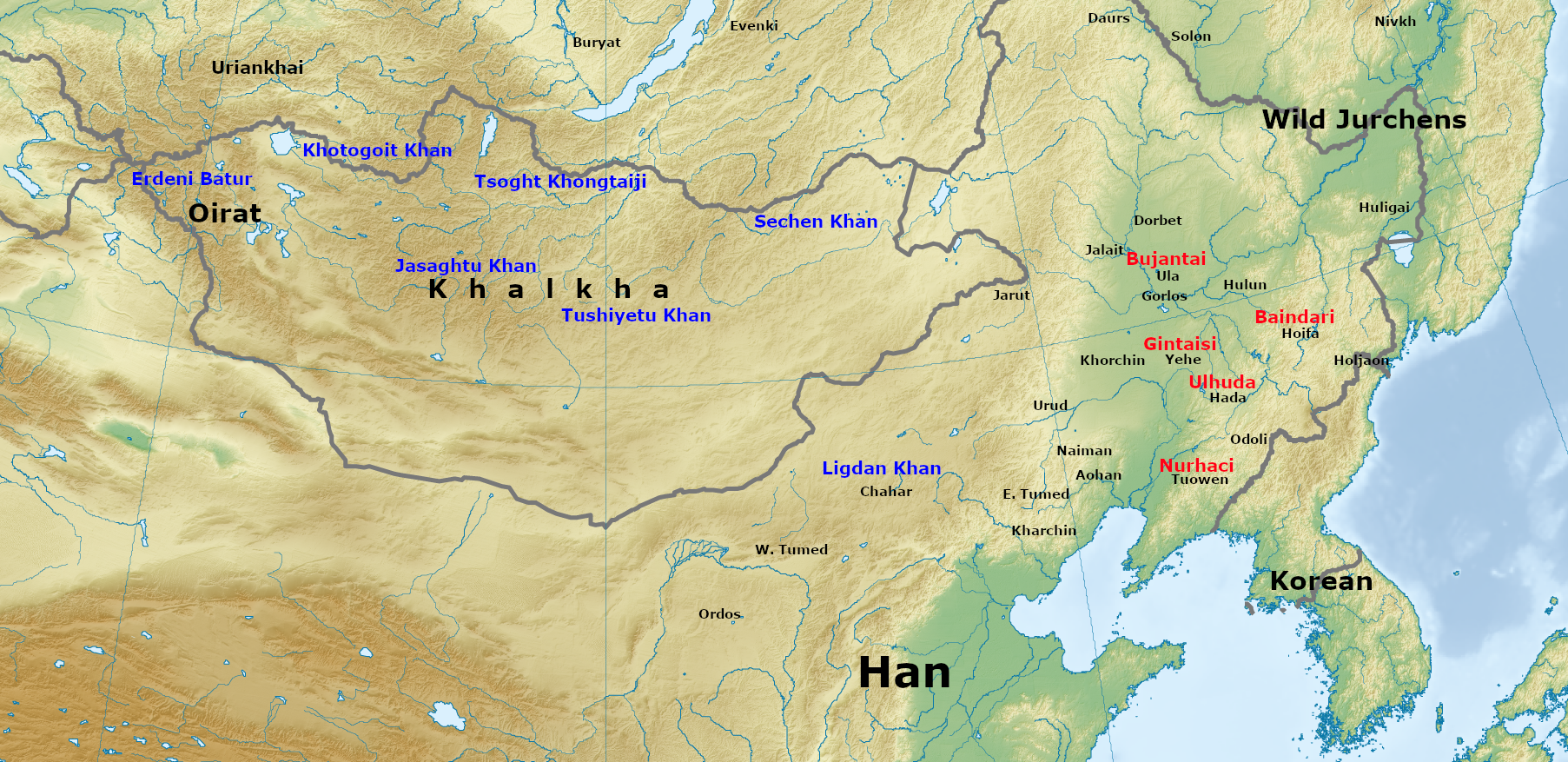
Major Mongol and Jurchen rulers prior to the Jurchen unification

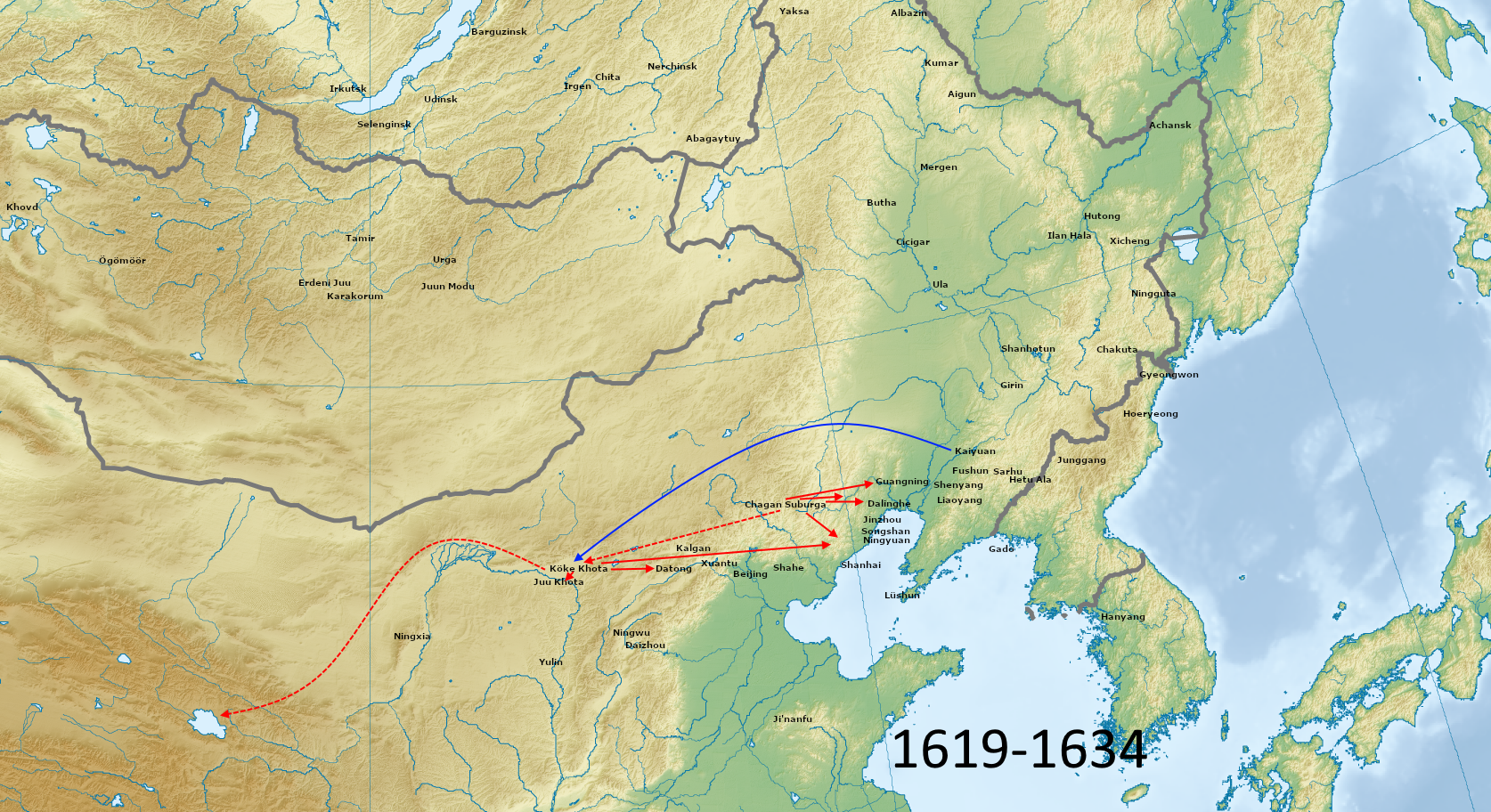
Chahar-Jurchen War, 1619–1634

In response, Ligdan waged war on the Mongol allies of the Jurchens in 1625. The Jurchen-Mongol army defeated Ligdan and forced him back. In the following year, Uuba Noyan of the Khorchin had his younger brother marry one of Nurhaci's daughters, cementing the alliance. Many of the Jurchens married Mongols. Ligdan appointed his own officials over the tumens and formed an elite military band to coerce opposition. In 1628, Ligdan defeated the Khorchins and Jurchen auxiliary at Zhaocheng but fled a large Jurchen punitive expedition. Only Tsogt Taiji (1581–1637) supported the Great Khan whilst other nobles of Khalkha remained neutral and inactive. In 1632, Hong Taiji of the Jurchens and his Mongol allies defeated the Chahars and captured Ligdan's family. Ligdan lost any authority he had over the non-Chahar tumens. Ligdan died on his way to Qinghai to punish the Gelug order in 1634. His son, Ejei Khan, surrendered to the Qing dynasty and was said to give the Imperial Seal of the Mongols to Qing emperor Hong Taiji the next year (February 1635), ending the Kublaid descent ruled Northern Yuan.

After Ligdan Khan's death in 1634, the Mongols formed four Khanates, from west to east:

- The Altan Khan of Khalkhas in the far west, founded by Sholoi Ubashi, great-grandson of Geresandza.
- The Dzasagtu Khans, a khanate founded by Laikhor-khan, a cousin of the Altan Khan.
- The Tushetu Khans at Ulaanbaatar founded by Abatai, another grandson. This was the senior branch.
- The Sechen Khans at the eastern end of modern Mongolia, were founded by Sholoi, a great-grandson.

== Aftermath ==
=== Outer Mongolia ===
The various regimes on the Mongolian Plateau after the proclamation of Qing dynasty

In 1636, all of Inner Mongolia had already been conquered by the Manchus, and the successors of the Mongol Empire were also under Manchu authority. The son of Ligdan Khan, Ejei, died under mysterious circumstances. His rank was given to his brother Abunai, who refused to attend court with the Manchus. Abunai's rank was then passed on to his son, Burni, who rebelled against the Manchus in 1675, but the uprising was defeated and Burni died in battle. The Qing emperors then placed the Chahar Mongols under their direct rule.

In Outer Mongolia the Khalkhas still against Manchu rule, Tüsheet Khan Gombodorj retained his independence and suzerainty over the Sechen and Jasagtu khans. However another independent entity known as Altan Khan of the Khalkha emerged in Jasagtu territory. With the loss of Inner Mongolia and the Imperial Mongol Seal, the Mongols had to search for a new source of authority. As a result, in 1639, Gombodorj's son became the first Jebtsundamba Khutuktu, the spiritual head of the Gelug Buddhists in Mongolia. Gombodorj did his best to maintain peaceful relations with the rising Manchus by sending tribute. He also stopped providing horses to the Ming dynasty. Diplomacy failed after the Manchus defeated the Ming in 1644 and seized Beijing. In 1646, a Mongol noyan rebelled against the Qing but was crushed under overwhelming odds. In 1647, Gombodorj met the Qing in battle with 50,000 cavalry and neither side were able to obtain a decisive victory. Although both sides suffered heavy losses, the Mongol army constituted a larger part of their overall forces than the Qing, signalling that the Mongols no longer had the numbers to directly confront the Qing in battle.

In the mid-17th century, Gombodorj died and was succeeded by his young and inexperienced son Chikhundorj. In 1655, the Qing began interfering in Tusheet affairs by appointing their own lamas in Tusheet territory. Thus Outer Mongolia also gradually fell under Qing control.

=== Dzungar Khanate ===
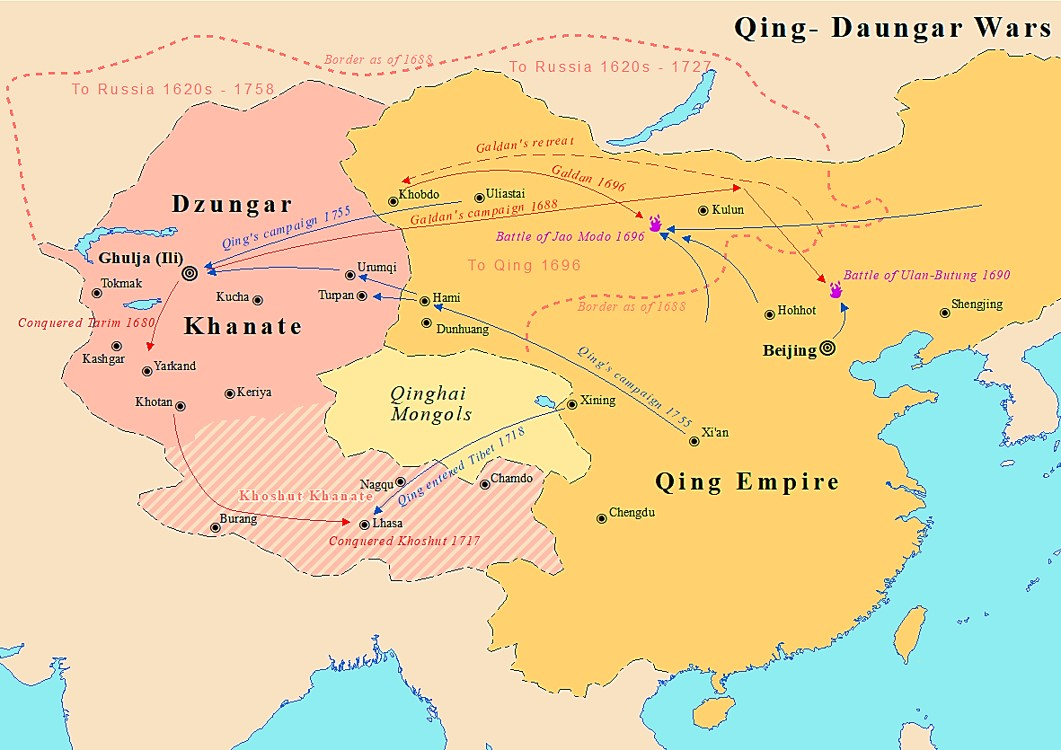
Dzungar–Qing Wars, 1687–1757

Meanwhile to the west, about 1600–1620, the Oirats united under Kharkhul. In 1635, the Oirats under Kharkhul's son Erdeni Batur formed the Dzungar Khanate. This unification was partly driven by their wars with the Altan Khans. When the Jasagtu Khan Shira lost part of his subjects to the Tüsheet Khan Chikhundorj, Galdan Boshugtu Khan of the Dzungars moved his orda near the Altai Mountains to prepare an attack. Chikhundorj attacked the right wing of the Khalkhas and killed Shira in 1687. In 1688, Galdan dispatched troops under his younger brother Dorji-jav against Chikhundorj but they were eventually defeated and Dorji-jav was killed in battle. Chikhundorj then murdered Degdeehei Mergen Ahai of the Jasagtu Khan who was on the way to Galdan. To avenge the death of his brother, Galdan established friendly relations with the Russians who were already at war with Chikhundorj over territories near Lake Baikal. Armed with Russian firearms, Galdan led 30,000 Dzungar troops into Outer Mongolia in 1688 and defeated Chikhundorj in three days. The Siberian Cossacks, meanwhile, attacked and defeated a Khalkha army of 10,000 near Lake Baikal. After two bloody battles with the Dzungars near Erdene Zuu Monastery and Tomor, Chikhundorji and his brother Jebtsundamba Khutuktu Zanabazar fled across the Gobi Desert to the Qing dynasty and submitted to the Kangxi Emperor.

By 1690, Galdan had control of Outer Mongolia as far as the edge of Manchuria, before turning his attention east towards Beijing. This expansion of the Dzungar state was viewed with worry by the Qing, which led the Kangxi Emperor (Enh-Amgalan khaan-in Mongolian) to block Galdan. Late in the summer of 1690, Galdan crossed the Kherlen River with a force of 20,000 and engaged a Qing army at Battle of Ulan Butung 350 kilometers north of Beijing near the western headwaters of the Liao River. Galdan was forced to retreat and escaped total destruction because the Qing army did not have the supplies or ability to pursue him. In 1696, the Kangxi Emperor led 100,000 troops into Mongolia. Galdan fled from the Kherlen only to be caught by another Qing army attacking from the west. He was defeated in the ensuing Battle of Jao Modo near the upper Tuul River. Galdan's wife, Anu, was killed and the Qing army captured 20,000 cattle and 40,000 sheep. Galdan fled with a small handful of followers. In 1697 he died in the Altai Mountains near Khovd on 4 April. Back in Dzungaria, his nephew Tsewang Rabtan, who had revolted in 1689, was already in control as of 1691. Outer Mongolia was thus incorporated into the Qing Empire, and the Khalkha leaders returned to Outer Mongolia as Qing vassals. A Qing garrison was installed at Ulaanbaatar. The Qing forces occupied Hami but did not advance into Dzungaria. The Dzungars later expanded into Tibet and Kazakhstan, but they too were conquered by the Qing dynasty in 1755, and all resistance was crushed by 1758.

== See also ==
- List of khans of the Northern Yuan dynasty
- List of Mongol states
