= Jinong =

Mongolian honorific title

Jinong (Mongolian: :ᠵᠢᠨᠣᠩ
, Жонон, Jonon) was a title of the Mongols. It was derived from Chinese Jinwang (Chinese: 晉王; pinyin: jìn wáng; lit. 'Prince of Jin', a title for crown prince, similar to Prince of Wales) although some historians have suggested it originates from Qinwang (Chinese: 親王; pinyin: qīnwáng; lit. 'prince'). Whatever its relation with the Chinese title, the Mongol title was rendered in Chinese as "jinong" (Chinese: 濟農; pinyin: jǐnóng) or "jinang" (Chinese: 吉囊; pinyin: jínáng).

The title of Jinong was first given to Kamala, a grandson of Kublai Khan in 1292. He served the mausoleum of Genghis Khan. Those who served the mausoleum were called the Ordus and Jinong came to mean the highest priest of the portable mausoleum. The Ordus lived on the Kherlen River but later moved to the area now known as Ordos. After Dayan Khan, whose father was the Jinong, unified the Mongolian Plateau, his descendants assumed the position until 1949. During the Qing dynasty the Jinong also served as the chief of the Yeke Juu League (Mongolian: Их Зуу Чуулга) or a banner in it.

== See also ==
- Mausoleum of Genghis Khan
