= Timeline of the Northern Yuan =

Mongol history

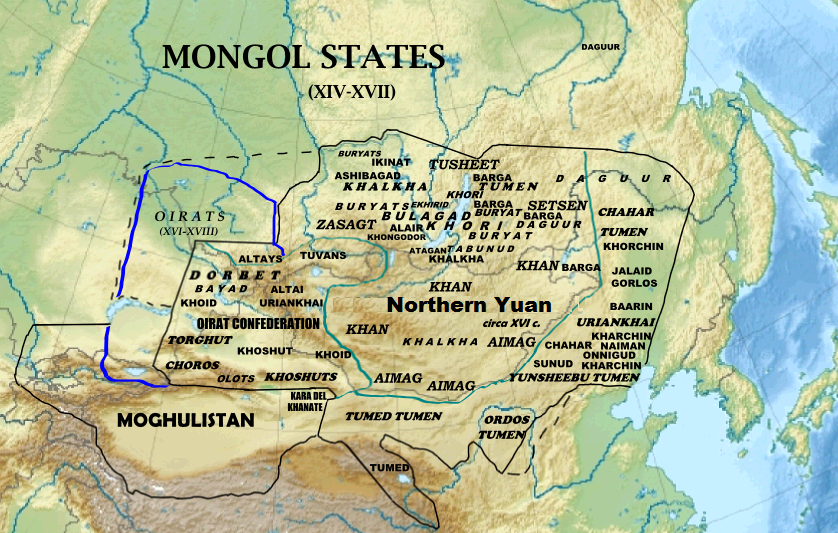
Northern Yuan

This is a timeline of the Northern Yuan dynasty.

== 14th century ==
Year	Date	Event
1368		The Yuan dynasty retreats to Karakorum
1380		Ming dynasty sacks Karakorum
1381	December	Ming conquest of Yunnan: Ming forces take Qujing
1382	April	Ming conquest of Yunnan: Ming forces conquer Yunnan
1387	October	Ming campaign against the Uriankhai: Naghachu surrenders to Ming forces
1388	May	Battle of Buir Lake: Ming forces defeat Uskhal Khan Tögüs Temür
1388	November	Jorightu Khan Yesüder defeats Uskhal Khan and became the Khagan of Forty-four tumun Mongols
1399		The Four Oirats break away from Mongol Khagan

== 15th century ==
Year	Date	Event
1408		Öljei Temür Khan defeats Örüg Temür Khan and becomes ruler of Mongols
1409	23 September	Battle of Kherlen: Ming forces are defeated by Öljei Temür Khan
1410	15 June	First Mongol Campaign: The Yongle Emperor defeats Öljei Temür Khan on the banks of the Onon River
1410	July	First Mongol Campaign: Ming forces defeat Arughtai east of the Greater Khingan and withdraw to Nanjing
1414	April	Second Mongol Campaign: Ming forces engage Oirats at the Tuul River, suffering heavy casualties, but ultimately prevail through the use of heavy cannon bombardments
1422	April	Third Mongol Campaign: Ming forces are dispatched against Arughtai but fail to engage him in combat and return to Beijing
1423	August	Fourth Mongol Campaign: The Yongle Emperor launches an offensive against Arughtai only to find out he had already been defeated by the Oirats
1424	April	Fifth Mongol Campaign: The Yongle Emperor leads an expedition against the remnants of Arughtai's horde but fails to find them
1428	October	Uriankhai raid Ming borders and the Xuande Emperor personally leads troops to repel them
1433		The Oirats install Taisun Khan as leader of the Eastern Mongols
1449	July	Tumu Crisis: Esen Taishi of the Oirats and de facto ruler of the Northern Yuan launches an invasion of the Ming dynasty
1449	4 August	Tumu Crisis: The Zhengtong Emperor departs from Beijing to personally confront Esen Taishi
1449	30 August	Tumu Crisis: The Ming rearguard is defeated
1449	1 September	Tumu Crisis: The Ming army is annihilated and the Zhengtong Emperor is captured by Esen Taishi
1449	27 October	Esen Taishi lays siege to Beijing but fails to take it and withdraws after 5 days
1451		Esen Taishi declares himself Yuan Emperor, which causes widespread dissent among his followers
1454		Esen Taishi is killed and the Northern Yuan is once more split into two portions between the Oirats and Eastern Mongols
1479		Dayan Khan becomes ruler of Northern Yuan
1483		Dayan Khan defeats Ismayil Taishi

== 16th century ==
Year	Date	Event
1504		Datong is raided by Mongols
1510		Dayan Khan conquers the Ordos Loop
1517	16 October	Dayan Khan raids the Ming dynasty
1517	20 October	The Zhengde Emperor repels Dayan Khan's raiding party
1531		Datong comes under raid by Mongols
1536		Mongols raid Shanxi but are repelled
1537		Mongols raid Datong
1541	October	Altan Khan raids Shaanxi
1542	July	Altan Khan raids Shaanxi
1542	4 August	Ming forces are defeated by Altan Khan at Guangwu
1542	8 August	Altan Khan pillages the suburbs of Taiyuan
1548	June	Mongols defeat Ming forces at Xuanfu
1548	October	Mongols raid Huailai
1549	March	Altan Khan defeats Ming forces at Xuanfu but suffers heavy casualties
1550	1 October	Altan Khan pillages the suburbs of Beijing
1550	6 October	Ming forces are defeated by Mongols
1552	April	Ming forces are defeated by Mongols north of Datong
1557		Daraisung Guden Khan is succeeded by his son, Tümen Zasagt Khan
1557	winter	Sengge, son of Altan Khan, lays siege to a garrison near Datong
1566		Altan Khan captures some lamas in a raid
1576		Buddhism becomes the state religion of Northern Yuan
1577		Altan Khan names Sonam Gyatso the Dalai Lama, the first living person to take the title
1590		The Uriankhai and Yunshebu Tümen disperse, breaking into smaller units called ulus (nations)
1598		Mongols kill Li Rusong, the Ming commander-in-chief

== 17th century ==
Year	Date	Event
1619		Chahar-Jurchen War: Ligdan Khan attacks Guangning, a horse trading town under the protection of Nurhaci, but is defeated
1625		Chahar-Jurchen War: Ligdan Khan's attack is turned back by a combined Khorchin Jurchen force
1634		Chahar-Jurchen War: Ligdan Khan is overthrown and displaced by Hong Taiji
1636		Mongols south of the Gobi Desert submit to the Qing dynasty
1691		The Khalkha Mongols submit to the Qing dynasty after being invaded by the Dzungar Khanate
1696		Dzungar–Qing Wars: The Qing dynasty takes all of Mongolia from the Dzungar Khanate

== Bibliography ==
- Adle, Chahryar (2003), History of Civilizations of Central Asia 5, UNESCO Publishing
- Crossley, Pamela Kyle (1997), The Manchus, Blackwell Publishers Ltd
- Mote, F. W. (2003), Imperial China: 900–1800, Harvard University Press, ISBN 978-0674012127
- Narangoa, Li (2014), Historical Atlas of Northeast Asia, 1590-2010: Korea, Manchuria, Mongolia, Eastern Siberia, New York: Columbia University Press, ISBN 9780231160704
- Twitchett, Denis (1998), The Cambridge History of China Volume 7 The Ming Dynasty, 1368—1644, Part I, Cambridge University Press
