= Oirat Confederation =

Confederation of Oirat tribes of Western Mongolia

Four Oirats ᡑᡈᠷᡋᡈᠨ ᡆᡕᡅᠷᠠᡑ Dörbön Oyirad ᠳᠥᠷᠪᠡᠨ ᠣᠶ᠋ᠢᠷᠠᠳ Дөрвөн Ойрад Dörvön Oirad
- 1399–1634
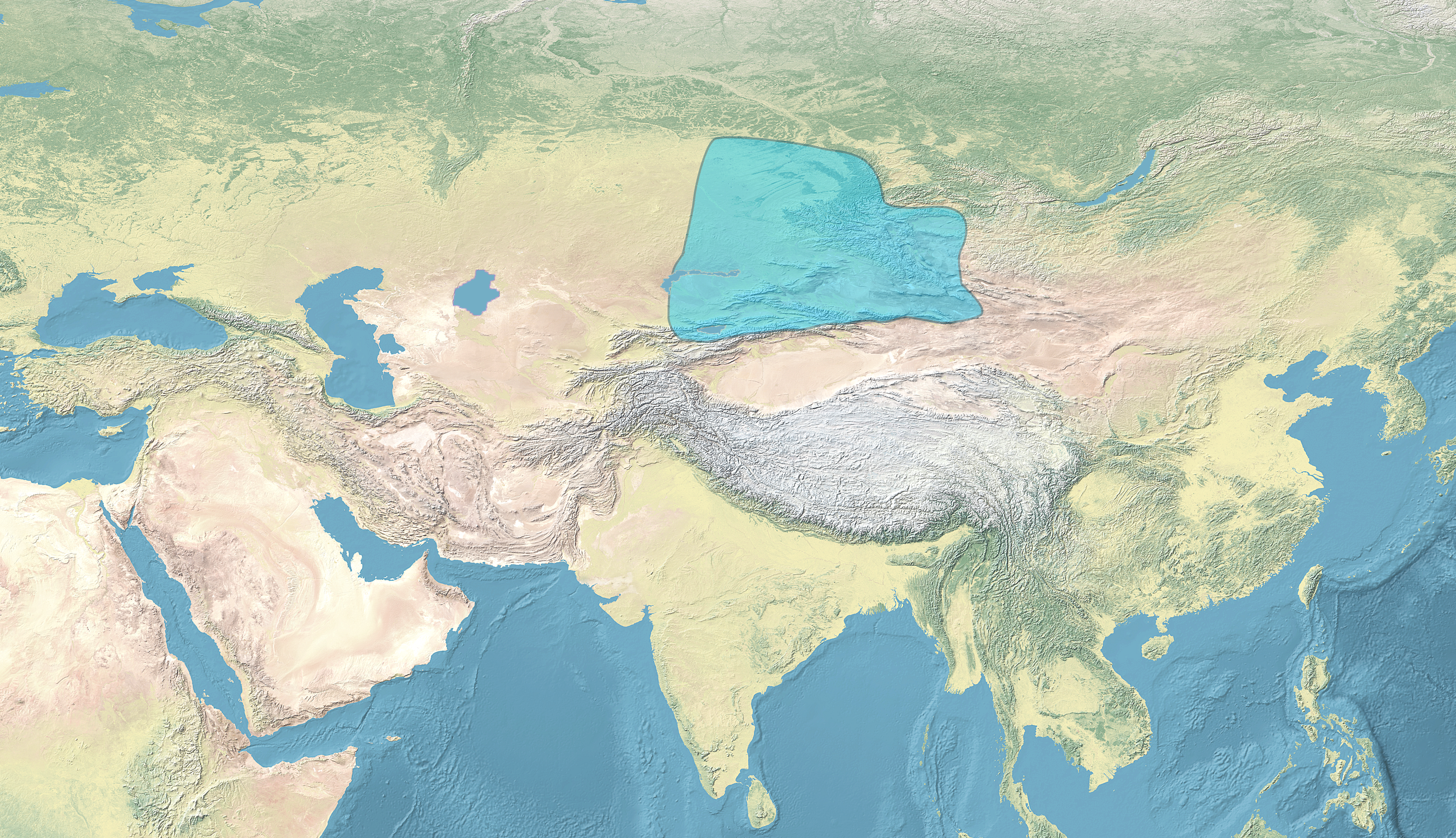
- The Oirat Confederation and contemporary Asian polities c. 1405
- Status: Nomadic empire
- Common languages: Mongolic
- Religion: Mongolian shamanism; later Buddhism
- Government: Monarchy
- Taishi
- Legislature: Customary rules; Mongol-Oirat Code
- Historical era: Postclassical to early modern period
  - Möngke-Temür places himself at the head of the Oirats: 1399
  - Oirats overthrow a Genghisid Khagan: 1399
  - Esen Taishi becomes Northern Yuan Khagan: 1453–54
  - Movement of the Torghuds to the Volga: 1616–17
  - Establishments of the Dzungar Khanate and the Khoshut Khanate: 1630s
  - Disestablished: 1634
Preceded by
Northern Yuan
Succeeded by
Dzungar Khanate
Kalmyk Khanate
Khoshut Khanate

The Four Oirats (Written Oirat: ᡑᡈᠷᡋᡈᠨ
ᡆᡕᡅᠷᠠᡑ, Dörbön Oyirad; Mongolian: Дөрвөн Ойрад, romanized: Dörvön Oirad, pronounced [ˈtɵrw̜ʊ̈ɴ ˈɞe̯ɾ(ə)t]; Chinese: 四衛拉特) or Oirat Confederation, formerly known as the Eleuths, was the confederation of the Oirat tribes which marked the rise of the Western Mongols in the history of the Mongolian Plateau.

Despite the universal currency of the term "Four Oirat" among Eastern Mongols, Oirats, and numerous explanations by historians, no consensus has been reached on the identity of the original four tribes. While it is believed that the term Four Oirats refers to the Choros, Torghut, Dörbet, and Khoshut tribes, there is a theory that the Oirats were not consanguineous units, but political-ethnic units composed of many patrilineages. In the early period, the Kergüd tribe also belonged to the confederation.

== Background ==
The Oirats were one of the forest peoples who lived in west of the Mongols of Genghis Khan. They submitted to Genghis in 1207 and played prominent roles in the history of the Mongol Empire.

After the overthrow of the Yuan dynasty (1271–1368), Möngke-Temür, a high official of the Yuan, had placed himself at the head of the Oirats. When he died, three chieftains, Mahamu (Mahmud), Taiping and Batu-bolad, ruled them. They sent envoys with gifts to the Ming dynasty. In 1409, the Yongle Emperor (r. 1402–1424) bestowed upon them the noble title of wang in return. The Oirats began to challenge the Borjigin Emperors of the Northern Yuan in the reign of Elbeg Khan (c. 1394–1399).

Before 1640, the Oirats had been wavering between the two faiths, Islam and Buddhism.

== Apogee ==
The Yongle Emperor of the Ming dynasty demanded Öljei Temür Khan Bunyashiri to accept his supremacy in 1409 but Öljei Temür refused and defeated a Ming force the next year. In 1412 a large force under Yongle forced Öljei Temür Khan to flee westward. The Oirats led by Mahamu of Choros killed Öljei Temür who suffered great loss.

The Western Mongols had Delbeg Khan—a descendant of Ariq Böke, whose family had been relegated to the Mongolian Plateau during the Yuan dynasty—crowned. However, the Eastern Mongols of the Northern Yuan under Arugtai of the Asud refused to accept the new khan and they were in constant war with each other. The Ming dynasty intervened aggressively against any overpowerful Mongol leader, exacerbating the Mongol-Oirat conflict.

In 1408, Mahamu was succeeded by his son Toghan, who continued his strife with Arugtai chingsang. By 1437, Toghan had totally defeated Arugtai and an Ögedeid Emperor Adai Khan. Toghan made Genghisid princes his puppet khans of the Northern Yuan dynasty. When he died in 1438, his son Esen became a taishi. The Oirats had close relations with Moghulistan and Hami where the Chagatayid Khans reigned.

From the Ming chronicles, it is known that the Oirats conducted regular raids on those areas. Esen crushed the Moghulistan and Hami monarchs and forced them to accept him as their overlord. He also conquered Outer Mongolia and Inner Mongolia and subjugated the Jurchens in Manchuria. The Ming dynasty's Emperor Yingzong was captured by Esen in 1449.

During his reign, the Oirat power base was centered on northwestern Mongolian Plateau and Barkol and the Irtysh were the western limits of their settlement. Esen relied on Muslim merchants from Samarkand, Hami and Turpan and his own royal house: Choros was related to Moghulistan according to a myth. After murdering Khagan Agbarjin, Esen took the title khan for himself. But soon after he was overthrown by the Oirat noblemen and killed by a son of a man whom he executed.

== Decline ==
Esen's death broke up the unity of the Oirats. They now warred with each other for leadership. Esen's son Amasanj moved west, pillaging the lands of Hami, Moghulistan and the Uzbegs.

From 1480 on, the Eastern Mongols under Mandukhai Khatun and Dayan Khan pushed the Oirats westward. By 1510, Dayan Khan had unified the various Mongol tribes, including the Oirats. However, the Khalkhas and some princes of southwest Inner Mongolia repeatedly launched massive attacks on the Oirats and looted their properties in the Irtysh, Barkol and Altai from 1552 to 1628.

The Oirats were still powerful in the Mongolian Plateau even after the fall of Esen and continued to hold Karakorum until the 16th century when Altan Khan recaptured the city from the hands of the Oirats. Oppressed and subjugated by Altan Khan of the Khalkha, the Oirat Confederation crushed the Khalkha prince Sholoi Ubashi Khong Tayiji perhaps around 1623.

== Collapse and formation of the Dzungar Khanate ==
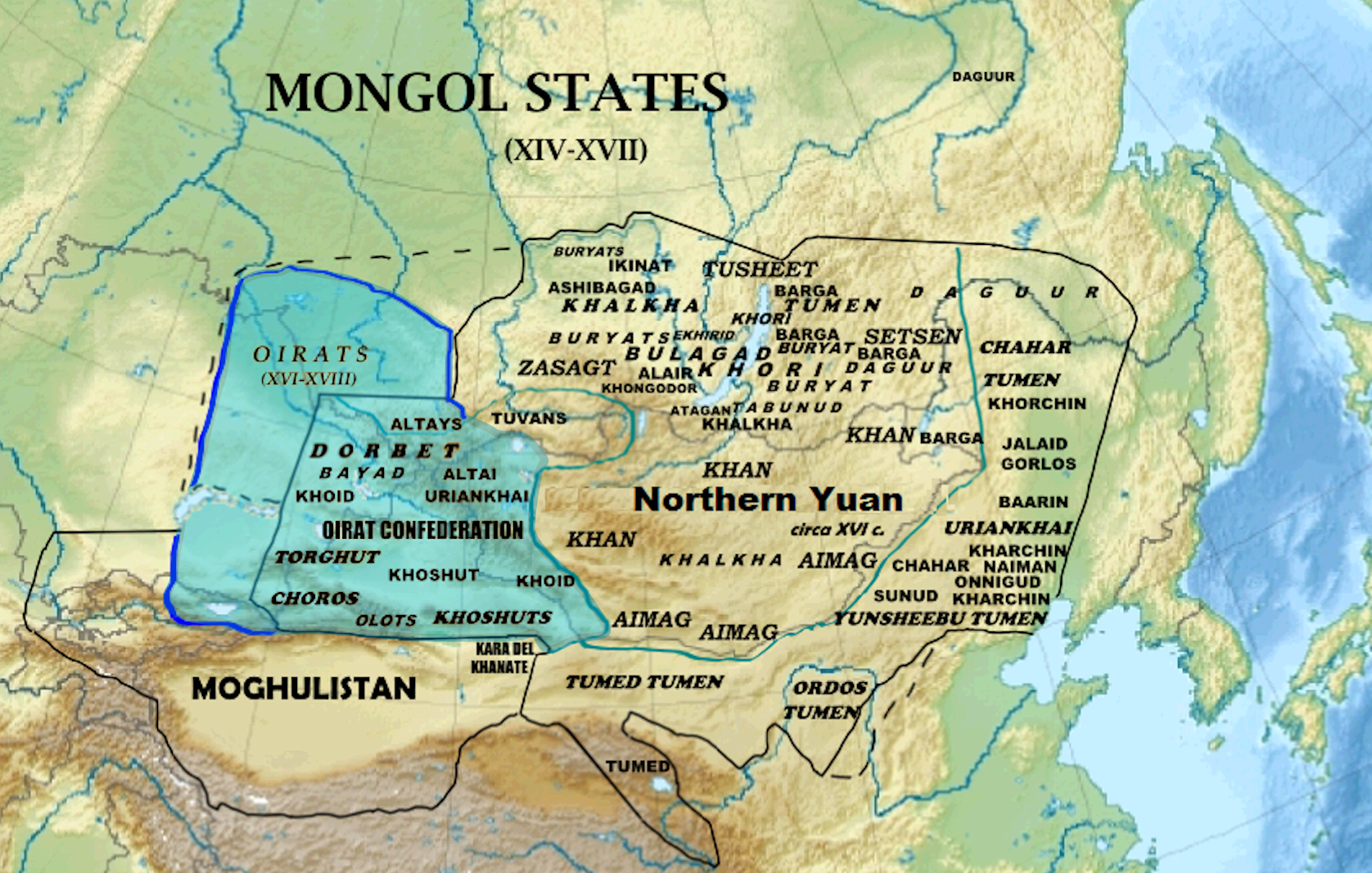
The location of the Four Oirats, Oirat Confederation

The collapse of the confederation of the Oirats began with Torghuds, along with the Dorbets and a few Khoshud clansmen, seceding from the union. In 1628, the Torghut chief Khoo Orlug with some Dorbets and Khoshuts moved westward across the Kazakh steppes. The little jüz of the Kazakhs and the Nogais tried to halt them at Nemba and Astrakhan but were defeated by the Torghuts. The Torghuts subjugated local Turkic peoples of Mangyshlak Peninsula and Caspian Sea. They colonized the Volga Delta and occupied whole steppes north of the Caspian, establishing the Kalmyk Khanate. The Kalmyks plundered the Khanate of Khiva from 1603 to 1670. The Kalmyk Khanate proved good allies to the Russian Empire.

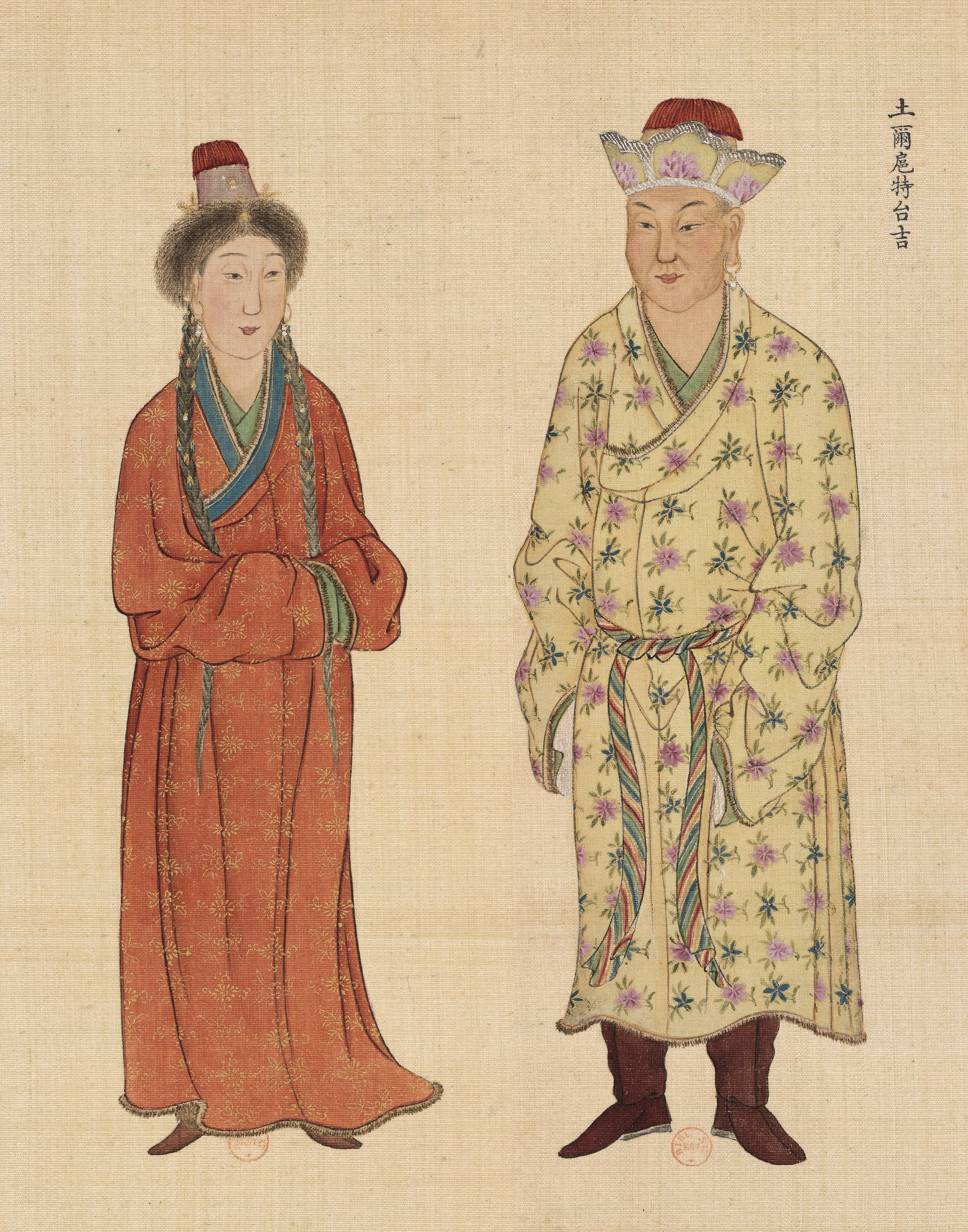
Tayiji (台吉, prince) of the Torghuts, one of the Four Oirats tribes, and his wife (土爾扈特台吉). Huang Qing Zhigong Tu, 1769

The Khoshut Güshi Khan went to Qinghai (Koke Nuur) in 1636. He increased his possessions in Tibet and Amdo. Güshi Khan protected the 5th Dalai Lama and his Yellow Church from the old red clergy of the Tibetan Buddhism. The Khoshut Khanate defeated the enemy of the Dalai Lama and Güshi Khan appointed his son ruler of Tibet.

About 1620, the Choros scattered after bitter fighting with the Khalkha Altan Khan. Some of the Choros fled with a body of the Dorbed northward into Siberia and present-day Baranaoul. But the majority of the Choros with the Dorbets and the Khoits settled in the region of the Black Irtysh, the Urungu, the Imil, and the Ili, forming the Dzungar Khanate.

In 1640, the Oirats and the Khalkha made peace and formed an alliance, issuing new code, the Mongol–Oirat code. Led by the Khoshut nobility, the Oirats began to convert to Buddhism. They became the chief defenders of the Dalai and Panchen Lamas. The Oirats who used the Mongolian script adopted in 1648–49 the clear script designed by the Oirat cleric and scholar Zaya Pandita Namkhaijamtsu.

In the 17th century, the Dzungar pioneered the local manifestation of the ‘Military Revolution’ in Central Eurasia after perfecting a process of manufacturing indigenously created gunpowder weapons. They created a mixed agro-pastoral economy, as well as complementary mining and manufacturing industries on their lands. The Zunghar managed to enact an empire-wide system of laws and policies to boost the use of the Oirat language in the region. Despite their geographical distribution, the Oirats maintained strong ties with each other and remained powerful players of Inner Asian politics until 1771.

== Leaders of the Oirat alliance ==
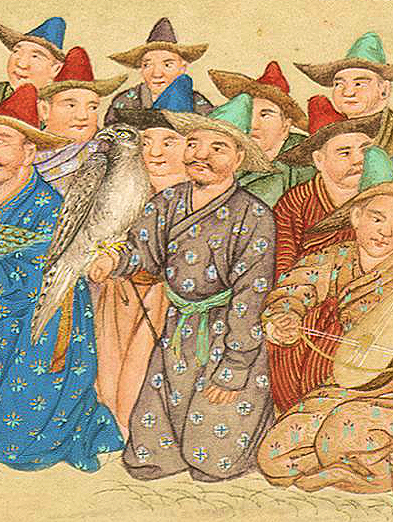
The Choros Oirat leader Dawachi surrendering to Qing general Zhaohui at Ili in 1755. Painting by Jesuit painter at the Qing court, Ignatius Sichelbart, 1764

- Üylintey Badan (c. 1368 – 1390s)
- Khuuhai Dayuu (c. 1399)
- Ugetchi Khashikha (1399–1415, "Mungke Temur": Four Oirat Khan of Kyrgyz ethnicity).
- Batula Chinsan (Bahamu, Mahamud) (1399–1408)
- Esehü (c. 1424)
- Toghon (1408–1438)
- Esen (1438–1454)
- Amasanj (1454–1455)
- Ishtömör (1455–1469)
- Khishig
- Arkhan
- Büüvei
- Khongor Khan
- Abai Khatan
