= Gün Temür Khan =

Toqoqan Khan Гүнтөмөр хаан ᠲᠣᠭᠣᠭᠠᠨ ᠬᠠᠭᠠᠨ
- Khagan of the Mongols
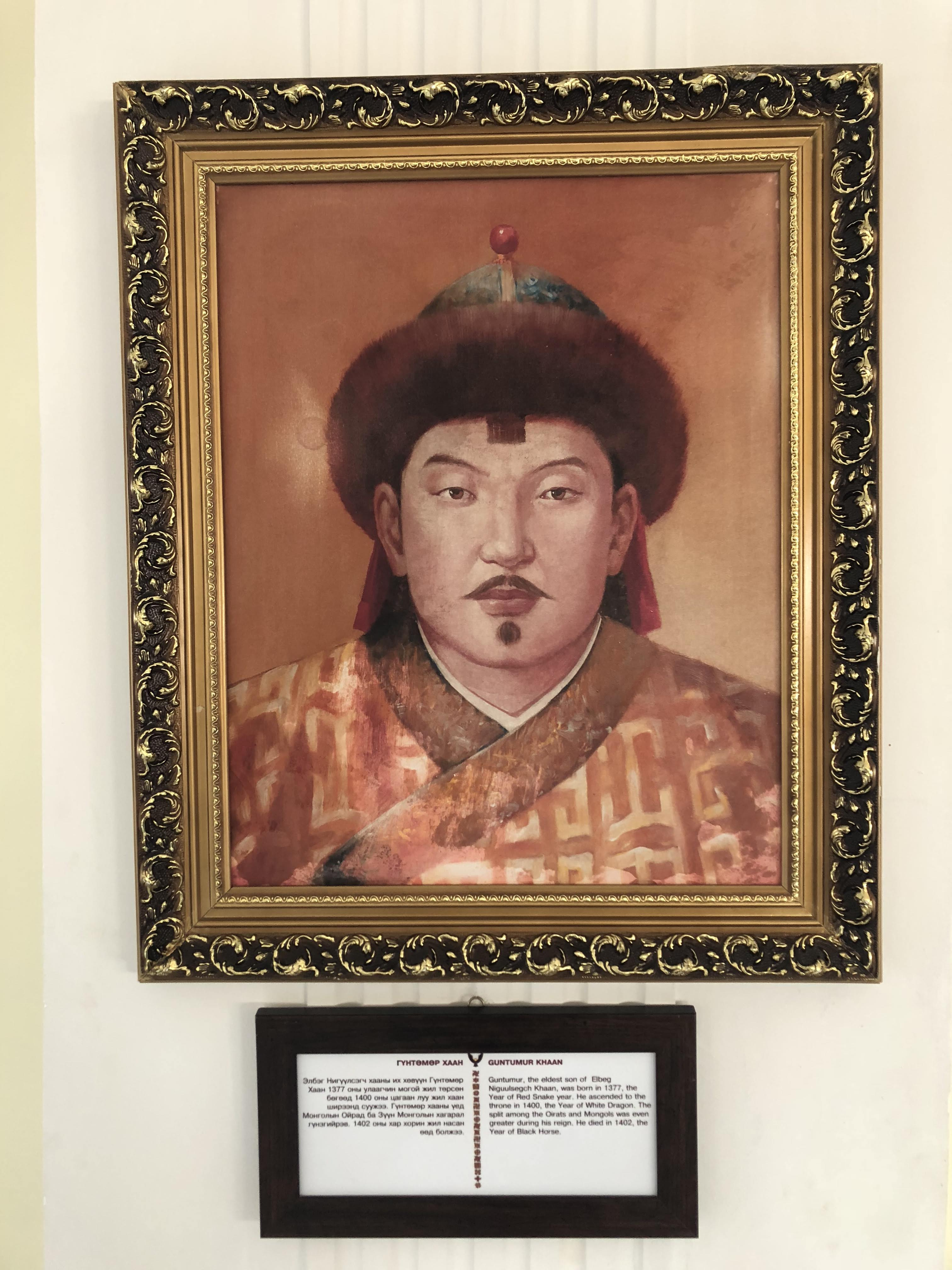

Khagan of the Northern Yuan dynasty
- Reign: 1399–1402
- Coronation: 1400
- Predecessor: Elbeg Nigülesügchi Khan
- Successor: Örüg Temür Khan
- Born: 1377
- Died: 1402 (aged 24–25)
- Issue: Toqoqan Khan
- House: Borjigin
- Dynasty: Northern Yuan
- Father: Elbeg Nigülesügchi Khan (?)

Gün Temür (Mongolian: Гүн Төмөр; Mongolian script: ᠭᠦᠩ ᠲᠡᠮᠦᠷ; Chinese: 坤帖木兒), regnal name Toqoqan Khan (Mongolian: Тогоон Хаан; Chinese: 托歡汗), (1377–1402) was a khagan of the Northern Yuan dynasty, reigning from 1399 to 1402. Erdeniin Tobchi claimed that Gün Temür was the eldest son of Elbeg Nigülesügchi Khan, but records in Habib al-siyar and Zafarnama he as other Genghizid (maybe descendant of Ariq Böke). His name, Gün Temür, means "Deep (intellectually) Iron" in the Mongolian language.

== Reign ==
In 1402, Gün Temür was defeated by Gulichi (possibly with Arughtai), who killed him as a result. Gulichi later seizes the title Örüg Temür Khan. Several years later, Elbeg Nigülesügchi Khan's son Bunyashiri returned to Mongolia and succeed the throne, known as Öljei Temür Khan.

== See also ==
- List of khans of the Northern Yuan dynasty

Gün Temür Khan House of Borjigin Died: 1402
Regnal titles
Preceded by Elbeg Nigülesügchi Khan	Khagan of the Northern Yuan dynasty 1399–1402	Succeeded by Örüg Temür Khan
