= Yongle Emperor's campaigns against the Mongols =

1410–1424 Chinese military campaigns

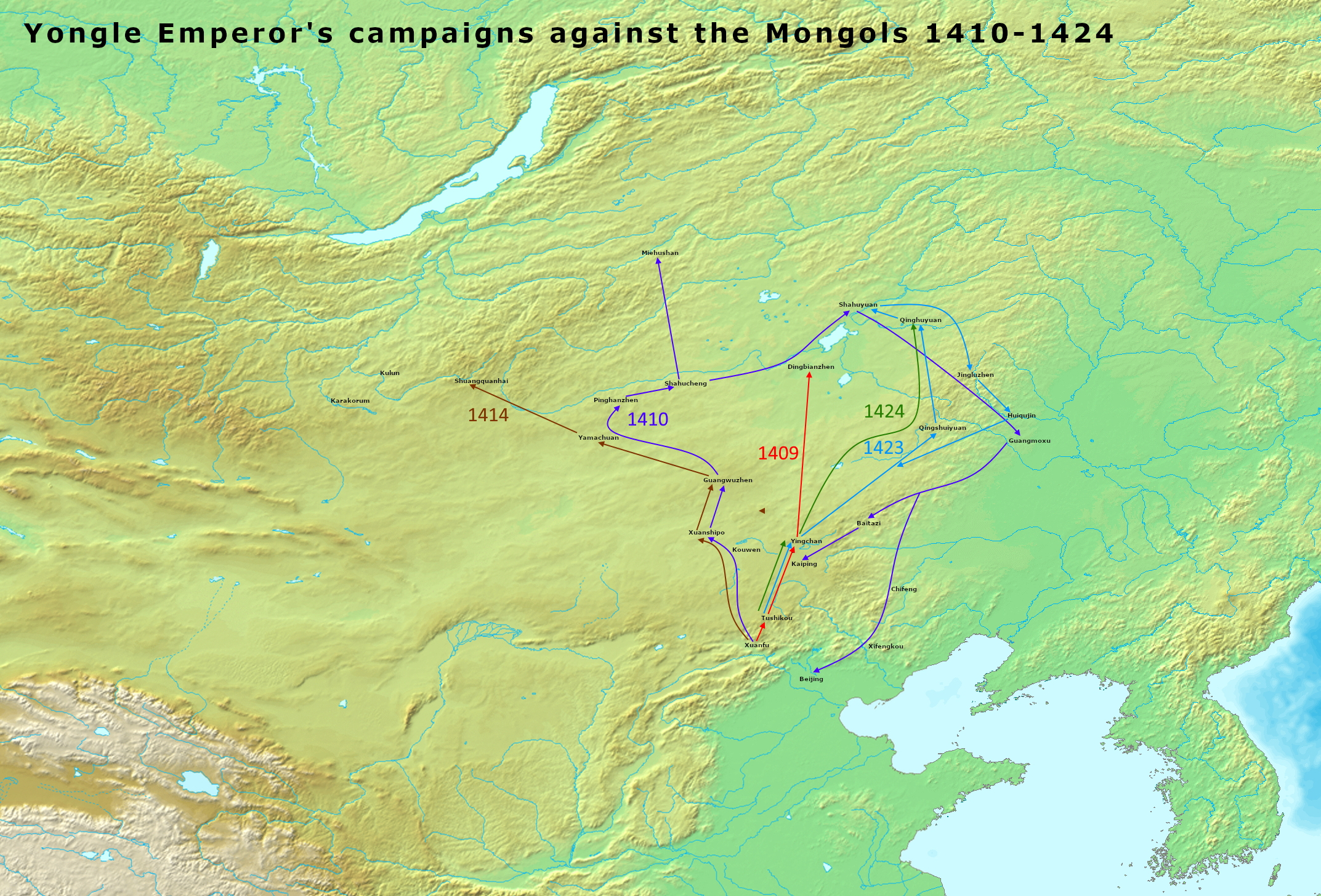
- Map showing the Yongle Emperor's Mongolian campaigns
Date	1410, 1414, 1422, 1423, 1424
Location	Mongolian Plateau
Result	Inconclusive: Weakening of both sides; Status quo ante bellum

Belligerents
Ming dynasty	Eastern Mongols Oirat Mongols Various Mongol tribes

Commanders and leaders
Yongle Emperor	Eastern Mongols: Bunyashiri; Arughtai Oirat Mongols: Mahmud

The Yongle Emperor of Ming China led five large-scale military expeditions into Mongolia between 1410 and 1424. His goal was to subjugate the Mongols, and he encouraged conflict between the Eastern Mongols and the Oirats (Western Mongols). In 1410, he defeated the Eastern Mongols in two battles and maintained good relations with them for the next decade. In 1414, during the second expedition, he successfully attacked the increasingly powerful Oirats. From 1422 to 1424, after a long hiatus, he launched annual campaigns into eastern Mongolia but was unable to engage the enemy in battle. On the return from his final campaign in 1424, the Yongle Emperor died. His successors subsequently renounced further expeditions into the steppe.

== Background ==
The Hongwu Emperor established the Ming dynasty in China in 1368 after overthrowing the Mongol-led Yuan dynasty and forced the Mongols to retreat to the northern steppes, where they established the Northern Yuan. During the Hongwu Emperor's reign (1368–1398), the Mongol commander in Manchuria, Naghachu, surrendered to the Ming in 1387, and the Ming army under Lan Yu defeated Northern Yuan emperor Tögüs Temür in 1388. Many Mongol tribes in Manchuria surrendered and were subsequently incorporated into the Three Uriankhai Guards, serving along the empire's northern frontier.

The Ming court sought to incorporate the Mongols into the tributary trade system. In exchange for horses and other livestock, the Mongols received paper money, silver, silk, and textiles, while their leaders were granted titles and ranks. The Ming authorities restricted the scale of trade, a policy that the Mongols formally accepted but frequently violated. When nomadic groups obtained insufficient goods through trade, they resorted to raiding. Many Mongols migrated from the steppe into China, where they typically served in the military in place of conscripts from the weakening Weisuo system.

The Mongols were divided into western (Oirats) and eastern groups, with the Uriankhai forming a separate group. The Ming dynasty maintained its closest relations with the Uriankhai, who assisted the Yongle Emperor (r. 1402–1424) during the Chinese civil war from 1399 to 1402 in which he seized the throne from his nephew. The Uriankhai enjoyed the Yongle Emperor's trust during his reign. Living along the frontier, they became economically dependent on trade with China. Peaceful relations were only briefly disrupted when the Uriankhai were subordinated to the Eastern Mongols in 1422. The two main Mongol groups competed for dominance. (Note: The conflict between the Western and Eastern Mongols was influenced by a longstanding rivalry between two groups. On one side were the descendants of Ariq Böke and other Chinggisids who had resided in Mongolia during the 14th century. On the other side were the supporters of the Yuan dynasty who had retreated from China to Mongolia after 1368. Arughtai represented the latter group.) The Ming court responded with a strategy of "divide and rule", supporting the weaker side while attacking the stronger group.

Painting of the Yongle Emperor (National Palace Museum)

In 1403, the Yongle Emperor reorganized the defense of the northern frontier by evacuating territory north of the Great Wall around Daning in order to reduce the cost of garrisons and their supply. The Ming redeployed troops south to the Beijing region, while the Uriankhai, who lived farther north, settled the vacant lands. The Beijing provincial military command was moved from Daning to Baoding, southwest of Beijing. Apart from garrisons in Jurchen territories in Manchuria, no Ming forces were stationed north of the Great Wall, with the sole exception of the garrison at Kaiping, which was not withdrawn until 1430. Although the strategy promised financial savings, it carried significant risks, as any defection by the Uriankhai would have undermined these gains.

During the early years of the Yongle era, the Mongols of Mongolia proper remained persistently hostile toward the Ming dynasty. Örüg Temür Khan, who was neither related to the Yuan imperial family nor a descendant of the Chinggisids, declared himself Great Khan of the Tatars in 1403 and renounced the claims inherited from the Yuan dynasty. This move strained Ming–Mongol relations. In 1408, however, the Eastern Mongol chieftain Arughtai killed Örüg Temur and subsequently supported Bunyashiri, a direct descendant of the Chinggisids, in becoming the new khan.

The Ming court established contacts with the weaker Oirats, whose embassies arrived in China almost annually from 1408 onward. In 1409, the Ming court dispatched the ambassador Guo Ji to the Eastern Mongols to demand that Bunyashiri submit as a tributary to China; however, he refused and had the ambassador executed. Encouraged by the Ming, the Oirats attacked the Eastern Mongols and pushed them back to the Kherlen River. The Yongle Emperor then dispatched an army of one hundred thousand troops under the command of Qiu Fu to attack the Eastern Mongols. The Ming forces were defeated in a battle on the banks of the Kherlen River in September 1409, and Qiu was killed. In retaliation for the killing of the Ming embassy and for this defeat, the Emperor resolved to punish the Mongols in person.

== Course ==
=== First campaign ===
In the winter of 1409, the Yongle Emperor made preparations for his military expedition. On 25 March 1410, he departed from Beijing on his military expedition against the Eastern Mongols. He brought with him an estimated 100,000 soldiers (Note: History of Ming gives an unlikely figure of 500,000 troops.) making use of 30,000 carts for transport. They traveled respectively to Xuanfu, Xinghe, and Kherlen. The Ming army, advancing from Xinghe, stopped at Minluanshu, because the Emperor held a large military parade before the Oirat Mongol envoys. At the northern shores of Kherlen, he had carved into the rocks "Eighth year of the Yongle gengyin (year), fourth month dingyou (month), sixteenth day renzi [May 19, 1410], the Emperor of the Great Ming passed here with six armies during the punitive expedition against the barbarian robbers".

Bunyashiri wanted to flee from the advancing Ming army, but Arughtai disagreed with him. Therefore, the two Mongol leaders and their forces each separated to a different direction. The Ming army first gave chase to Bunyashiri. On 15 June 1410, they annihilated Bunyashiri's forces at the Onon River, but Bunyashiri managed to escape from the Ming army. Afterwards, the Ming army pursued Arughtai and his Mongol forces. They found and defeated his forces at Qingluzhen near Taor River, but he fled with his remaining men. The Yongle Emperor returned to Beijing on 15 September 1410.

After his defeat, Arughtai attempted to establish a fragile relationship with the Ming, because he feared their military power and desired Chinese goods through trade. Surrendering as a tributary to the Ming, he established relations with the Ming court. Late 1410, Arughtai sent tribute horses to the Ming imperial court and received trading privileges. In the spring of 1412, Mahmud's forces found and killed Bunyashiri during his flight from the Ming army.

=== Second campaign ===
[His Highness] has swept away the venomous wasp,
For the next millennium.
[He] has washed away the mutton stench,
[We] return ten thousand li.

— Hu Guang (1370–1418) about the Yongle Emperor's victory over the Oirats in 1414

An inscription composed by the Emperor:
Hanghai is the hilt,
Heaven and Earth is the edge.
A single sweep of the northern horsemen's dust,
Forever clears the steppe.

— Yongle Emperor, an epigraph inscribed on a stone monument in present-day Naran, Sükhbaatar province, Mongolia

The Ming court's attitude became more disdainful and negative toward the Oirat Mongols. The Yongle Emperor denied the Oirat chieftain Mahmud's request for the bestowal of rewards to his followers who had fought against Bunyashiri and Arughtai. Mahmud soon became angered by the Ming court's disregard toward him. He imprisoned Ming envoys, so the Yongle Emperor sent the eunuch envoy Hai Tong (海童) in an unsuccessful attempt to secure their release. In 1413, Mahmud besieged Karakorum city and feeling threatened, he dispatched 30,000 Mongol troops to Kherlen River against the Ming. In late 1413, Arughtai informed the Ming court that Mahmud had crossed the Kherlen River, which triggered an imminent war with the Ming.

On 6 April 1414, the Yongle Emperor departed from Beijing to lead a military campaign against the Oirat Mongols. The Ming army advanced via Xinghe to Kherlen, where it met the Oirats in battle between the upper courses of the Tula and Kherlen rivers. The Oirats were overwhelmed by the heavy bombardment from the Ming cannons, suffered heavy losses, and were forced to retreat. Mahmud and the puppet khan Delbeg fled from the Ming army. The Yongle Emperor returned to Beijing in August 1414.

Arughtai excused himself from battle on the claim that he was allegedly unable to join due to illness. Even though Mahmud sought reconciliation with the Ming, the Yongle Emperor viewed the thought with much suspicion. Before anything could happen, Arughtai attacked and killed Mahmud and Delbeg in 1416.

=== Third campaign ===
Arughtai hoped to gain rewards from the Ming court for his services against the Oirat Mongols. The Ming court bestowed titles onto Arughtai and his mother, but did not give him the commercial privileges that he wanted. Arughtai became increasingly hostile and began attacking caravans at the northern trade routes to China. By 1421, he had stopped sending tribute to the Ming. In 1422, he attacked and overran the frontier fortress Xinghe. This would prompt the Ming into launching a third military campaign. Many senior officials opposed the expedition and urged the Yongle Emperor against launching it, because they found that it placed too great of an expense to the empire's treasury, but the Emperor rejected their advice. Minister of War Fang Bin (方賓) committed suicide, while the Emperor imprisoned Minister of Revenue Xia Yuanji and Minister of Works Wu Zhong (吳中).

On 12 April 1422, the Emperor and his army left Beijing toward Kulun. According to historian Morris Rossabi, the Ming army comprised 235,000 soldiers. According to Peter Perdue, it consisted of 235,146 men, 340,000 donkeys, 117,573 carts, and 370,000 dan of grain. The Emperor led his army toward Dolon, where Arughtai was encamped. A force of 20,000 troops was detached to the Uriankhai Guards, which had fallen to Arughtai; they were recaptured in July.

The Ming army struck fear into Arughtai, who avoided engagement by fleeing far into the steppe. They responded with the destruction and plundering of Arughtai's encampments. The frustrating and unedifying situation caused the Yongle Emperor to shift his attention to mercilessly attacking and plundering three Uriankhai Mongol tribes who were not involved with Arughtai's hostilities. The plunders and attacks against any Mongols who found themselves in the path of Ming armies would be repeated in following campaigns. The Ming army returned to Beijing on 23 September.

=== Fourth campaign ===
In 1423, the Yongle Emperor launched a preemptive strike against Arughtai's forces. Leaving from Beijing in August, the Ming armies traveled through Xinghe and Wanquan. However, Arughtai withdrew and fled from the advancing Ming army once again. Esen Tügel, an Eastern Mongol commander, surrendered to the Ming. The Ming army returned to Beijing in December 1423.

=== Fifth campaign ===
Arughtai continued raiding the northern frontier at Kaiping and Datong. In 1424, the Yongle Emperor responded by launching his fifth campaign. He gathered his army at Beijing and Xuanfu. In early April, he departed from Beijing toward Arughtai's forces. They marched through Tumu and north to Kaiping. Once again, Arughtai avoided engagement by fleeing from the Ming army. Some of the Ming commanders wanted to pursue Arughtai's forces, but the Yongle Emperor felt that he had overextended himself and pulled back his army. On 12 August 1424, the Emperor died during the return to China.

== Consequences ==
The costs of arming and equipping armies numbering in the hundreds of thousands exhausted the resources of the state. Despite all the effort expended, final victory continued to elude the Ming armies. The Yongle Emperor's campaigns only served to weaken the Mongols rather than achieving a decisive victory. Although the Ming often had larger forces, greater resources, and superior equipment, their advantage was offset by the nomads' mobility and the vastness of the war theater. Additionally, the use of cannons proved effective in inflicting heavy losses on Mongol cavalry, but it was not enough to overcome the nomads' ability to move quickly and the challenges of fighting in such a large area. Furthermore, the strategy of pitting Mongol leaders against each other ultimately backfired, causing them to become alienated from China. In the long term, the Yongle Emperor's approach, particularly the decision to withdraw to the Great Wall, weakened the Ming dynasty's position in the steppe. After 1424, the Ming no longer had either the capacity or the will to launch punitive expeditions into the steppe, and the only attempt to advance northward, in 1449, ended in the catastrophic Tumu Crisis.

== See also ==
- Ming dynasty in Inner Asia
- Battle of Kherlen
