= Khatun =

Turkic and Mongol female title of nobility

Ertûl Khatun and Qûlân Khatun ca. 1420-1430 from the Jami al-Tawarikh

Khatun (Note: Old Turkic: 𐰴𐰍𐰣, romanized: katun, Ottoman Turkish: خاتون, romanized: hatun; Uzbek: xotun; Persian: خاتون, romanized: xâtun; Tajik: хотун; Kurdish: خاتوون, romanized: Xatûn; Mongolian: хатун/ᠬᠠᠲᠤᠨ; Urdu: خاتون, romanized: xatun; Hindi: ख़ातून, romanized: khātūn; Bengali: খাতুন, romanized: khatun; Sylheti: ꠈꠣꠔꠥꠘ; Turkish: hatun; Azerbaijani: xatun; Punjabi: ਖਾਤੂਨ (Gurmukhi), خاتون (Shahmukhi)) (/xəˈtuːn/ khə-TOON) is a title of the female counterpart to a khan or a khagan.

== Etymology and history ==
Before the advent of Islam in Central Asia, "khatun" was the title of the queen of Bukhara. According to the Encyclopaedia of Islam, "Khatun [is] a title of Sogdian origin borne by the wives and female relatives of the Göktürks and subsequent Turkic rulers".

According to Bruno De Nicola in Women in Mongol Iran: The Khatuns, 1206–1335, the linguistic origins of the term "khatun" are unknown, though possibly of Old Turkic or Sogdian origin. De Nicola states that prior to the spread of the Mongols across Central Asia, Khatun meant lady or noblewoman and is found in broad usage in medieval Persian and Arabic texts.

Peter Benjamin Golden observed that the title qatun appeared among the Göktürks as the title for the khagan's wife and was borrowed from Sogdian xwāten "wife of the ruler". Earlier, British orientalist Gerard Clauson (1891–1974) defined xa:tun as "lady and the like" and said there was "no reasonable doubt that it is taken from Sogdian xwt'yn (xwatēn)", with "Sogdian xwt'y (lord, ruler) and xwt'yn (lord's or ruler's wife)" being "precisely the meaning of xa:tun in the early period".

Valide Hatun was the title held by the mother of an Ottoman sultan before the 16th century. By the beginning of the 16th century, the hatun title for imperial princesses, the sultan's mother and the sultan's chief consort was replaced by sultan. This usage underlines the Ottoman conception of sovereign power as family prerogative. Consequently, the valide hatun title turned into valide sultan.

=== Modern usage ===
In Uzbek, the language spoken in modern-day Bukhara, Uzbekistan, the word is spelled xotin and has come to simply refer to any woman. In Turkish, it is written hatun. The general Turkish word for woman, kadın, is a doublet derived from the same origin.

== Notable khatuns ==
- Qutluğ Säbäg Qatun, consort of Bilge Qaghan and regent of the Second Turkic Khaganate
- Narjis Khatun, mother of Muhammad al-Mahdi
- Tekina Khatun, mother of Timur
- Terken Khatun, chief consort of Malik-Shah I and regent of the Seljuk Empire
- Melike Mama Hatun, ruler of the Saltukids
- Börte, first wife of Genghis Khan
- Sulafa Khatun, only female ruler of Margha
- Töregene Khatun, chief consort of Ögedei Khan and regent of the Mongol Empire
- Ebuskun, consort of Mutukan and regent of the Chagatai Khanate
- Boraqchin, chief consort of Batu Khan and regent of the Golden Horde
- Oghul Qaimish, consort of Güyük Khan and regent of the Mongol Empire
- Chabi, second wife of Kublai Khan
- Dayfa Khatun, Ayyubid princess and regent of Aleppo
- Doquz Khatun, consort of Tolui and Hulegu Khan
- Tamar Gurju Khatun, chief consort of Kaykhusraw II
- Buluqhan Khatun, chief consort of Abaqa Khan
- Bulugan, second wife of Temür Khan
- Dagi Khatun, consort of Darmabala and empress dowager of the Yuan dynasty
- Radnashiri, consort of Ayurbarwada Buyantu Khan
- Despina Khatun, consort of Uzun Hasan
- Samur Gunj, daughter of Elbeg Nigülesügchi Khan
- Sara Khatun, mother of Uzun Hasan
- Mandukhai, consort of Dayan Khan
- Erketü Qatun, consort of Altan Khan
- Syeda Momena Khatun, daughter of Ghiyasuddin Mahmud Shah
- Queen Anu, consort of Sengge and Galdan Boshugtu Khan
- Rabia Bala Hatun, wife of Osman I
- Gülçiçek Hatun, concubine of Murad I
- Devlet Hatun, concubine of Bayezid I
- Gülfem Hatun, lady-in-waiting in the harem of Suleiman the Magnificent
- Canfeda Hatun, lady-in-waiting to Nurbanu Sultan
- Nene Hatun, Turkish folk heroine

== Given name ==
- Ayşe Hatun Önal, Turkish model
- Hatun Sürücü, German murder victim
- Khatun Sapnara, Bangladeshi-born British judge

== See also ==
- Khanum
- Begum
- Baig
- Begzada
- List of Mongol khatuns
