= Oyiradai =

Oyiradai Ойрадай хаан ᠣᠶᠢᠷᠤᠳᠠᠢ
- Khagan of the Mongols
- Reign: 1415–1425
- Coronation: 1415
- Predecessor: Delbeg Khan
- Successor: Adai Khan
- Died: 1425; Outer Mongolia
Names
- Oyiradai
- House: Borjigin
- Dynasty: Northern Yuan

Oyiradai (Mongolian: Ойрадай; Chinese: 斡亦剌歹), (?–1425) was a khagan of the Northern Yuan dynasty, reigning from 1415 to 1425. Oyiradai ascended to the throne with the help of the Oirats after Delbeg Khan was killed by eastern Mongols led by Adai Khan or perished in a battle with the Ming dynasty in the same year. His ascent to the throne was meant to legitimize Oirat rule because he was a direct descendant of Ariq Böke. Oyiradai’s reign only covers western Mongolian Plateau but this was expanded near his death: during his rule, with help from the Ming dynasty, western Mongols headed by Toghan launched two significant campaigns in 1422 and 1423 against Arughtai chingsang and Adai Khan respectively, controlling eastern and central Mongol territory, and both resulted in victory for Oirats.

After Oyiradai Khan’s death in 1425, the conflicts among Oirats and western Mongol clans left the throne of khan vacant for several years, and it was not until 1433 when the Oirats finally crowned Taisun Khan (Toghtoa Bukha) as the new khan. Meanwhile, in the east, the Oirat’s rival eastern Mongol clans proclaimed Adai Khan as the Great Khan in 1425, which eventually resulted in half a decade of the simultaneous existence of two khans supported by opposing Mongol clans.

== See also ==
- List of khans of the Northern Yuan dynasty

Oyiradai House of Borjigin Died: 1425
Regnal titles
Preceded by Delbeg Khan	Khagan of the Northern Yuan dynasty 1415–1425	Succeeded by Adai Khan
