= Adai Khan =

Khagan of the Northern Yuan dynasty

Adai Адай хаан ᠠᠳᠠᠢ
- Khagan of the Mongols
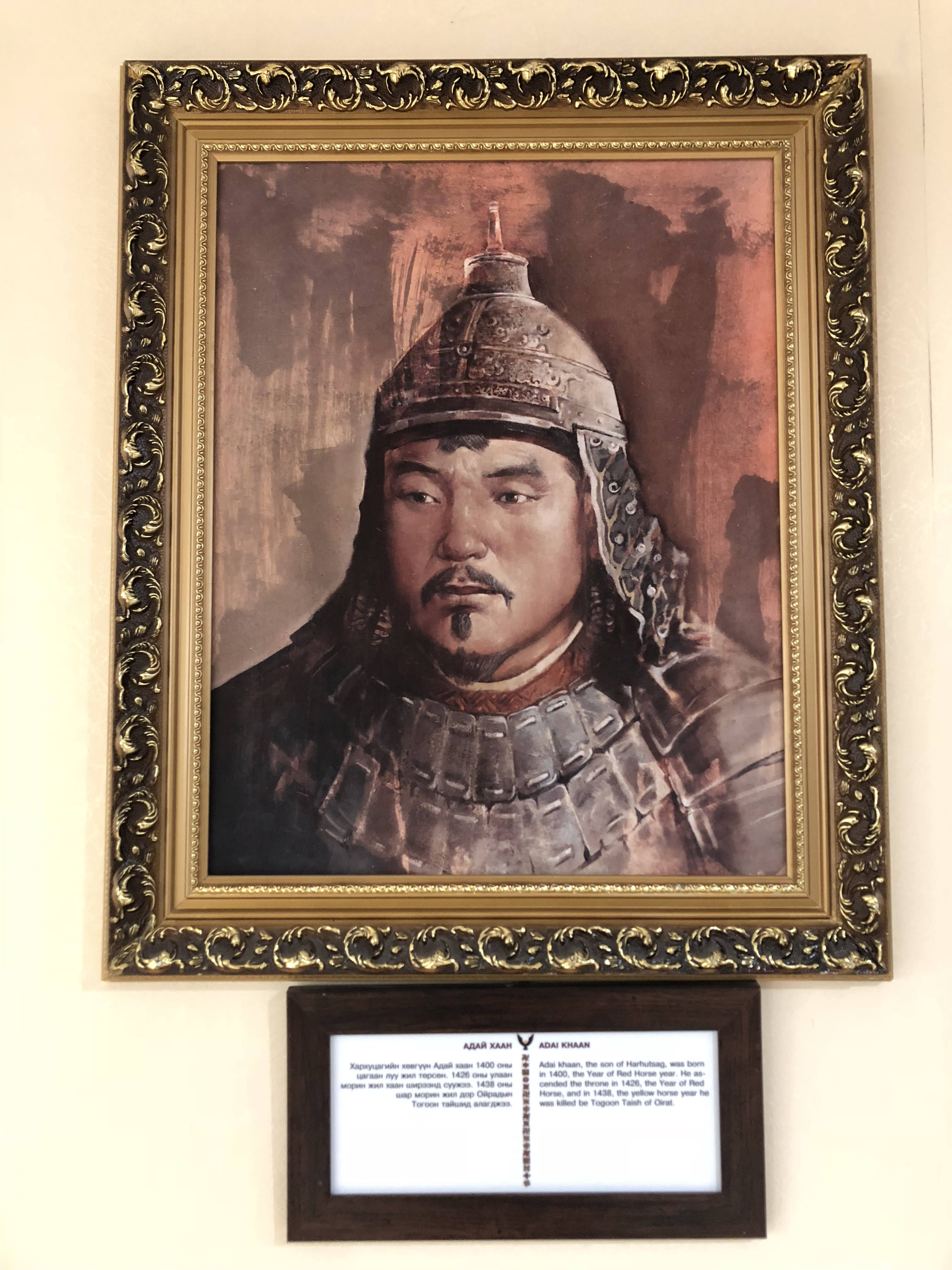

Khagan of the Northern Yuan dynasty
- Reign: 1425–1438
- Coronation: 1425
- Predecessor: Oyiradai
- Successor: Taisun Khan
- Born: 1390
- Died: 1438 (aged 47–48); Ejene
- Spouse: Samur Gunj
Names
- Adai
- House: Borjigin
- Dynasty: Northern Yuan
- Father: Örüg Temür(?)

Adai (Note: Classical Mongolian: ᠠᠳᠠᠢ [ˈad̥aɪ̯]; Mongolian: Адай [atɛ́ː]; Chinese: 阿台; pinyin: Ātái) (1390–1438) was a khagan of the Northern Yuan dynasty, reigning from 1425 to 1438. After the prominent eastern Mongol chancellor Arughtai gave his allegiance to him, Adai briefly reunited most of the Mongol tribes under his banner.

== Early life ==
The origin of Adai’s family lineage traced back to the House of Ögedei or Khorchin (descended of Genghis Khan‘s brothers). Mongol sources and Timurid-era books recorded Adai was a son of Örüg Temür Khan and his family lineage traced back to Kadan, while Erdeniin Tobchi believed that he was related to Temüge or Hasar due to the interfamily marriages within the Borjigin clan. Adai’s family was a member of one of the eastern Mongol clans, Khorchin, which originated in the region of the Nen River to the east of the Greater Khingan Range. Even before his proclamation as the Khagan, Adai almost succeeded in unifying western Mongol territory by defeating the Oirats. Alarmed by the possible resurgence of another Genghis Khan, the Ming dynasty provided support to the Oirats and their allies among the western Mongol clans, successfully turning the tide by first recovering and then launching counteroffensives against the eastern and central Mongol clans.

Arughtai Chingsang installed Adai on the throne as Khagan of the Northern Yuan after discussing the matter with the family of Khasar.

== Reign ==
During his rule, Adai was able to consolidate and expand his power, eventually unifying both the central and eastern Mongol territories in 1425. However, his conquest of western Mongol territory was checked by the Oirats and both sides continued the war for unification for decades. Riding on the success of unifying central and eastern Mongol territories, Adai proclaimed himself as Khagan with support of central and eastern Mongol clans in 1425, the same year his rival khan in the west, Oyiradai, was killed. Adai and Arughtai crushed the Oirats and killed several of their leaders. After capturing the Oirat nobles, Adai married Ugetchi Khashikha's wife, Öljeitü the Beauty, who had been a consort of Elbeg Khan (r.1392–1399), and enslaved Bahamu's son (the future Toghan taishi). Although Adai Khan’s authority did not fully reach western Mongols who did not recognize him as supreme ruler, the western Mongol clans did not have a khan of their own so Adai Khan remained as the sole Mongol ruler for the next eight years, at least in name. Elbeg's daughter and the Oirat taishi Bahamu's widow, Samar, persuaded the Khan to release her son, now named Toghan, to western Mongolia. However, in 1433, Toghan raised a rebellion and western Mongols finally crowned Toghtoa Bukha (or Toγtoγa Buqa) with the title of Tayisung Khan as their next khan, which resulted in half a decade of the simultaneous existence of two khans supported by opposing Mongol clans.

=== Decline ===
After two decisive campaigns in 1422 and 1423, Adai Khan lost all of the territory gained in the past and in 1430, the third Oirat victory wiped out his major strength, after which he could no longer mount any effective offensives and was forced on the defensive. Both sides attempted to utilize the stalemate to prepare for the next stage but Adai Khan could not recover from the previous loss. The Oirats soon launched another round of offensives and in the fourth decisive Oirat victory in 1434, Adai Khan’s major advisors, Arughtai, and others, were killed. Adai Khan’s downfall was certain.

=== Death ===
In 1438, Adai Khan was defeated in Ejin when his territory was overrun by the Oirats and their allies. Adai sought refuge in the Eight White Tents of Genghis Khan, however, being unarmed, he was murdered by Togoon taishi of the Oirat.

== See also ==
- List of khans of the Northern Yuan dynasty

== Notes ==
Adai Khan House of Borjigin Died: 1425-1438
Regnal titles
Preceded by Oyiradai	Khagan of the Northern Yuan dynasty 1425–1438	Succeeded by Tayisung Khan Toghtoa Bukha
