= Örüg Temür Khan =

Örüg Temür Khan Өрөгтөмөр хаан ᠶᠣᠯᠣ ᠲᠡᠮᠦᠷ ᠬᠠᠭᠠᠨ
- Khagan of the Mongols

Khagan of the Northern Yuan dynasty
- Reign: 1402–1408
- Coronation: 1402
- Predecessor: Gün Temür Khan
- Successor: Öljei Temür Khan
- Died: 1408
- Issue: Adai Khan(?)
- House: Borjigin
- Dynasty: Northern Yuan

Örüg Temür Khan, (Note: Mongolian: Ёл Төмөр Хаан, romanized: Yol Tömör Khaan, pronounced [jɔɮ tʰɵmɵr χaːɴ]; Classical Mongolian: ᠶᠣᠯᠣ ᠲᠡᠮᠦᠷ ᠬᠠᠭᠠᠨ [ˈjolŏ ˈtʰemyr ˈqʰaɣăŋ]; Chinese: 月魯帖木兒汗; pinyin: Yuèlǔ Tiēmùr Hàn) possibly also known by his nickname as Guiranchi, (Note: Classical Mongolian: ᠭᠤᠢᠷᠠᠨᠴᠢ [ˈg̊ui̯rantʃʰĭ]; Chinese: 鬼力赤; pinyin: Guǐlìchì) was a khagan of the Northern Yuan dynasty, reigning from 1402 to 1408. Örüg Temür, in historical materials compiled by the Timurid dynasty, has been a descendant of Ögedei. He might also be descended from either Ariq Böke or Genghis Khan's younger brothers—either Hasar or Temüge.

Elbeg Khan appointed Bahamu (Batula, Mahamu, Muhamud) ruler of the Four Oirats after he had mistakenly executed his father Khuuhai. The Khagan's decision disappointed the Oirat Torguud clan leader Ugechi Khashikha (Mongolian: Үгэчи Хашиха; Chinese: 烏格齊哈什哈, "Khashikha" means prince or duke in the Tungusic languages). Ugetchi Khashikha and Bahamu organized the plot to kill Elbeg and succeeded; the former seized the family and property of the late Khagan. There's a dispute over whether Örüg Temür was the same person as Ugechi Khashikha himself, because the Ming Dynasty recorded fierce battles between Guilichi of Eastern Mongols and Oirat's leaders. Thus, it is still unclear whether he was an Oirat or a Genghisid. The History of Ming recorded that Guilichi became the new khagan in 1402 and abolished the dynastic title of "Great Yuan" (大元) promulgated in 1271 by Kublai; however, the Han-style title had already been abolished in 1388.

== Reign ==
Guilichi appointed Arughtai of the Asud chingsang of the Eastern Mongols. According to Ming annals, he might have nominated a “Tatar” (East Mongols) khan. The Yongle Emperor made overtures to Guilichi and his principal retainer Arughtai to establish a relationship within Ming China's tributary system, but Guilichi and Arughtai rejected it. They also poisoned Engke Temur, Prince of Hami, who had allied with the Ming. However, Guilichi was defeated by Öljei Temür Khan, the Kublaid descent Borjigin monarch, in 1403. In 1408, his former chingsang and noyan Arughtai killed him after a conflict erupted between them.

== See also ==
- List of khans of the Northern Yuan dynasty

== Notes ==
Regnal titles
Preceded by Gün Temür Khan	Khagan of the Northern Yuan dynasty 1402–1408	Succeeded by Öljei Temür Khan
