= Delbeg Khan =

Delbeg Дэлбэг хаан ᠳᠡᠯᠪᠡ
- Khagan of the Mongols
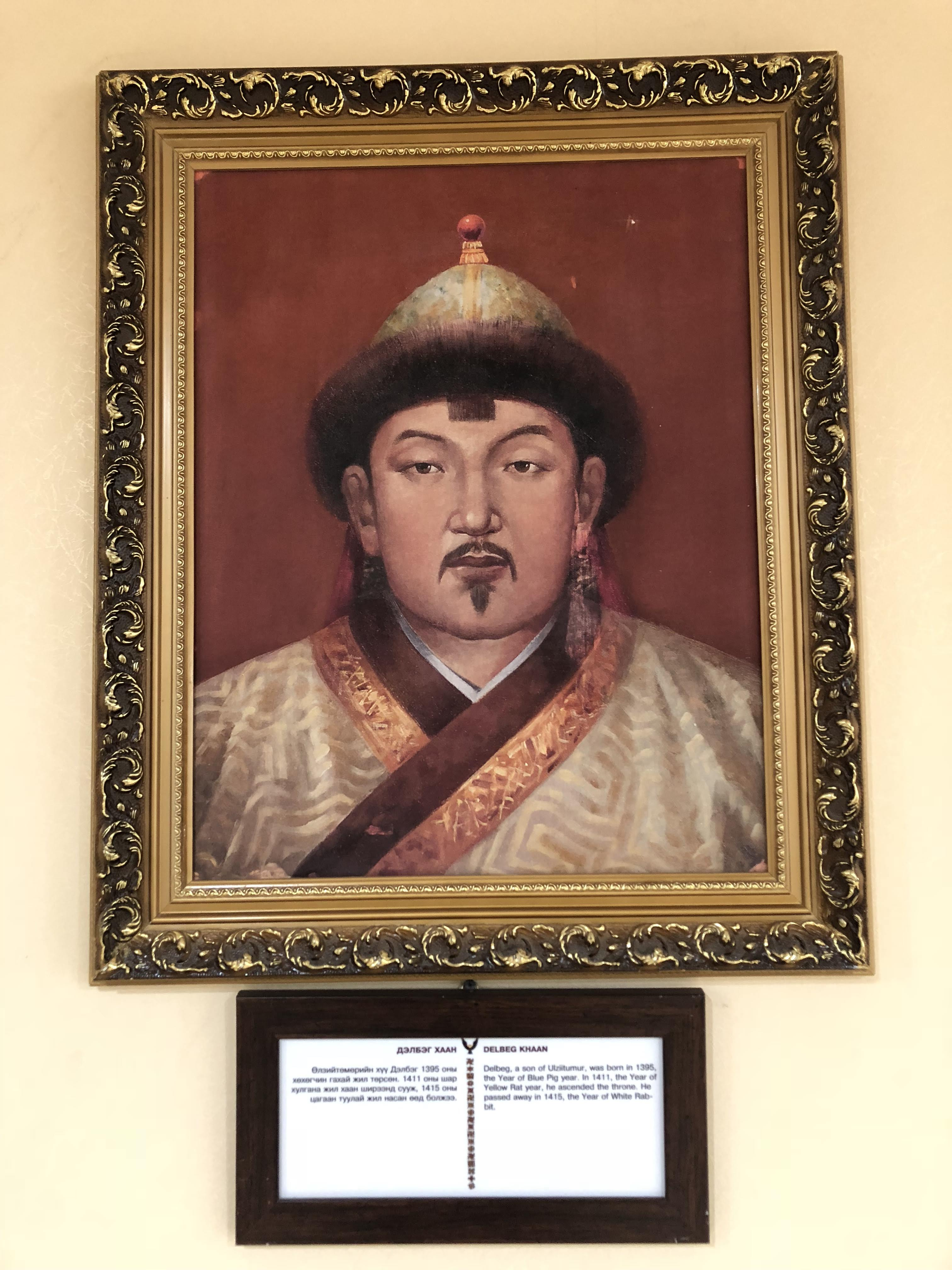

Khagan of the Northern Yuan dynasty
- Reign: 1412–1415
- Coronation: 1411
- Predecessor: Bunyashiri
- Successor: Oyiradai
- Born: 1395; Mongolian Plateau
- Died: 1415 (aged 19–20); Mongolian Plateau
Names
- Delbeg
- House: Borjigin
- Dynasty: Northern Yuan

Delbeg (Mongolian script:ᠳᠡᠯᠪᠡ Mongolian: Дэлбэг; Chinese: 答里巴), (1395–1415) was a khagan of the Northern Yuan dynasty, reigning from 1412 to 1415. Delbeg was installed by the Oirats in 1411 as a puppet ruler, but this was not recognized by most of Mongol clans in the central and eastern Mongol territories.

Delbeg became Khagan in 1411. According to Saghang Sechen, Delbeg was a son of Öljei Temür Khan (Buyanshir) who had instructed the Oirat leader Bahamu to make Delbeg the new Khan. However records in Shajrat Ul Atrak and Habib al-siyar, Delbeg was a direct descendant of Ariq Böke, and this blood lineage able to rally some support from Mongol populace in west. But his authority only prevailed in less than a third of Mongol territory, the western parts, while the eastern and central parts were under the control of Arughtai, and the two sides fought continuously for more than two decades. The Oirats forced Arughtai to seek refuge in the lands bordering the Ming dynasty in 1414.

In 1415, the Western Mongols led by Bahamu, Delbeg and Bolad were defeated by the Ming army which penetrated as far as Tuul River. However, it was a pyrrhic victory and the number of killed was about the same on both sides. The Ming Emperor was persuaded to return by his followers while the Mongols retired northwards.

Although Adai Khan did not proclaim the throne of Great Khan until 1425, he was able to first unify the eastern part and then the central part of the Mongol territory while denouncing the legitimacy of Delbeg Khan, and carried on campaigns against Delbeg, eventually succeeding in defeating and killing Delbeg Khan in 1415, along with many of his Oirats supporters. Delbeg Khan was succeeded by another direct descendant of Ariq Böke, Oyiradai Khan, chosen by the Oirats to boost the legitimacy of their rule.

== See also ==
- List of khans of the Northern Yuan dynasty

Delbeg Khan House of Borjigin Born: 1395 Died: 1415
Regnal titles
Preceded by Öljei Temür Khan	Khagan of the Northern Yuan dynasty 1412–1415	Succeeded by Oyiradai
