= Battle of Kherlen =

1409 battle between Northern Yuan and Ming dynasties

Date	23 September 1409
Location	North of Kherlen River, west of Onohu
Result	See aftermath

Belligerents
Eastern Mongols	Ming dynasty

Commanders and leaders
Bunyashiri; Arughtai	Qiu Fu †; Wang Cong †; Qoryocin †; Wang Zhong †; Li Yuan †

Strength
Unknown	1,000 cavalry

The Battle of Kherlen (Chinese: 臚朐河之戰) was fought between the Eastern Mongols and the Ming dynasty at the banks of Kherlen River (Kerülen River) on the Mongolian Plateau on 23 September 1409.

== Background ==
A conflict erupted between two Eastern Mongol leaders, the khan Guilichi and his principal retainer Arughtai, which culminated in the killing of Guilichi in 1408. Arughtai, the victor of the conflict, installed Bunyashiri as the new khan. Afterwards, the Ming court sent the envoy Guo Ji to demand the dispatch of a tribute embassy, but they killed the envoy instead. In contrast, the Mongol leader Mahmud of the Oyirad Mongols (Western Mongols) sent a tribute mission to the Yongle Emperor of Ming China in 1408. The Ming court, who were appalled that the Eastern Mongols refused to establish tributary relations and murdered their envoy, would use the Oyirad Mongols to offset the Eastern Mongols.

The Eastern Mongols were attacked north of Ningxia by the Oyirad Mongols led by Mahmud and were thus routed to the Kherlen River, so the Yongle Emperor took the opportunity for a military expedition against the Eastern Mongols. The emperor sent an army led by Qiu Fu against the Eastern Mongols. The Mingshi records that the army comprised 100,000 cavalry, but Rossabi (1998) states that this is an unrealistic and exaggerated figure.

== Battle ==
On arrival at Kherlen River, Qiu Fu's troops captured a Mongol who revealed that the enemy was disorganized and retreating chaotically. They acted on this information and pursued the Eastern Mongols into the steppe. Rossabi (1998) remarks that they did so without taking into account the tactic of feigned retreat. Qiu Fu only took a force of 1,000 cavalry in the pursuit north of the river.

Bunyashiri and Arughtai's forces attacked Qiu Fu's force west of Onon river, which resulted in the defeat of Qiu Fu's force and the death of Qiu Fu in the battle. Qiu Fu only had the 1,000 cavalry when the Eastern Mongols engaged. He was detached from the other troops in his army and was in a vulnerable position when the Eastern Mongols launched their attack.

In the battle, Qiu Fu, the Duke of Qi, was killed along the four marquises Wang Cong, Qoryocin, Wang Zhong, and Li Yuan, who all assisted Qiu Fu in the military campaign.

== Aftermath ==
The Yongle Emperor blamed Qiu Fu for not waiting until the main body of the army arrived, posthumously stripped Qiu Fu and Qoryocin (who reluctantly went along with Qiu Fu) from their noble titles, and exiled Qiu Fu's family to Hainan island. After this battle, the emperor would personally lead a punitive expedition against the Eastern Mongols, which resulted in the defeat of both Bunyashiri and Arughtai's forces by the Ming army in the expedition.
