= Qiu Fu =

Chinese general (1343–1409)

- 丘福
- Born: 1343; Fengyang
- Died: 1409 (aged 65–66)
- Occupation: General
- Title: Duke of Qi (Note: Chinese: 淇国公; Chinese: 淇國公; pinyin: Qí Guógōng) (posthumously stripped of title), later posthumously honored as Prince of Shucheng (Note: Chinese: 舒城王; pinyin: Shūchéng Wáng (posthumously honored by the Hongguang Emperor in 1644))

Chinese name
- Chinese: 丘福
Transcriptions
Standard Mandarin
- Hanyu Pinyin: Qiū Fú

Qiu Fu (1343–1409) was a Chinese military general of the Ming dynasty, who achieved high rank during the reign of the Yongle Emperor, but fell in battle against the Mongols.

Qiu Fu was from the Fengyang region and was a member of the household of Zhu Di, Prince of Yan, during his youth. He quickly rose through the ranks and, during the civil war of 1399–1402, became one of the leading generals in Zhu Di's army alongside Zhu Neng. In 1402, Zhu Di ascended to the throne as the Yongle Emperor and bestowed upon Qiu Fu the title of Duke of Qi (淇國公) in October of that same year. This elevated Qiu Fu to one of the highest-ranking generals in Ming China. During discussions about the succession to the throne, Qiu Fu advocated for the appointment of the Emperor's second son, Zhu Gaoxu, but in 1404, the Emperor chose his eldest son Zhu Gaochi as his successor and Qiu Fu became his tutor.

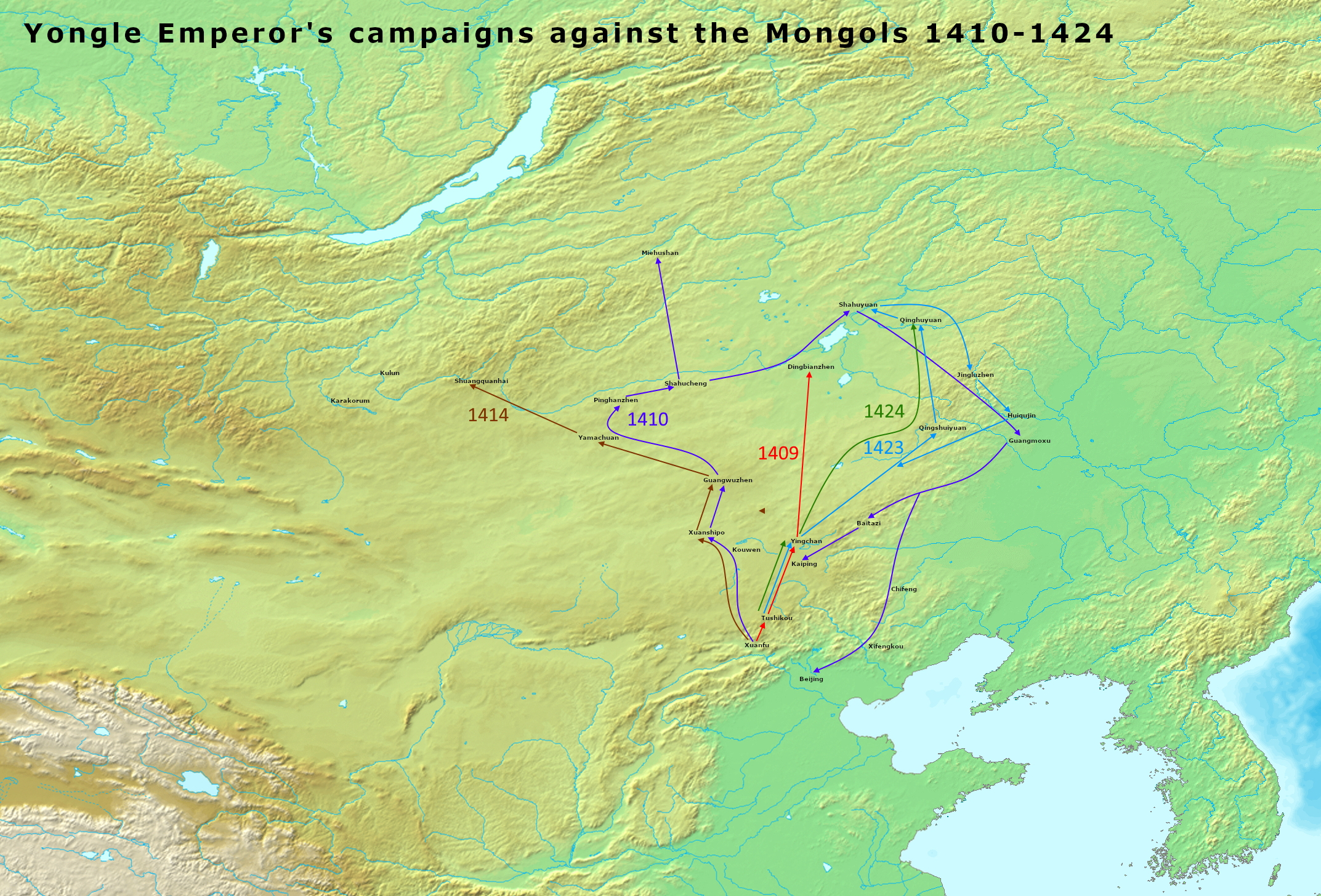
Map showing the Ming campaigns into Mongolia during the Yongle era, with a red arrow indicating the campaign of Qiu Fu in 1409

In 1409, the Emperor entrusted Qiu Fu with leading a punitive expedition against the Eastern Mongols, who were under the leadership of Öljei Temür Khan Bunyashiri and Arughtai, but in September of that year, his forces were defeated by the Mongols in the Battle of Kherlen, and Qiu Fu was killed in action. The Yongle Emperor held Qiu Fu responsible for the defeat and stripped him of all his titles, positions, and honors. He also exiled Qiu Fu's entire family to Hainan Island.

The following year, the Yongle Emperor personally led a campaign against the Mongols, marking the first of his five expeditions against the Mongols.
