= Öljei Temür Khan =

15th-century khagan of the Northern Yuan dynasty

Öljei Temür Khan 完者帖木兒汗 ᠥᠯᠵᠡᠶᠢᠲᠡᠮᠦᠷ ᠬᠠᠭᠠᠨ
- Khagan of the Mongols
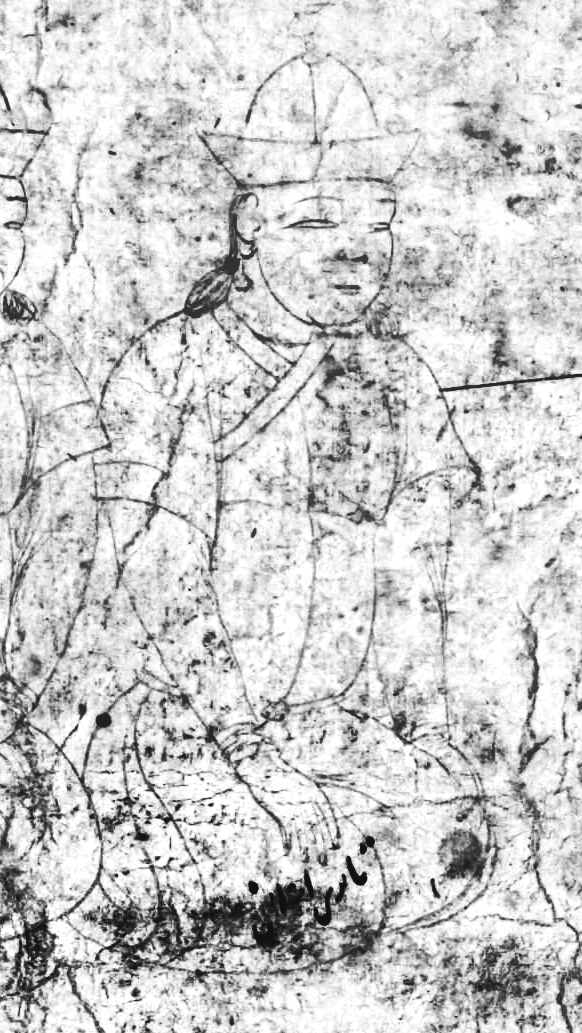

Khagan of the Northern Yuan dynasty
- Reign: 1408–1412
- Coronation: 1408
- Predecessor: Örüg Temür Khan
- Successor: Delbeg Khan
- Born: 1379; Mongolia
- Died: 1412 (aged 32–33); Outer Mongolia
Names
- Bunyashiri
- House: Borjigin
- Dynasty: Northern Yuan
- Father: Elbeg Nigülesügchi Khan
- Religion: Islam

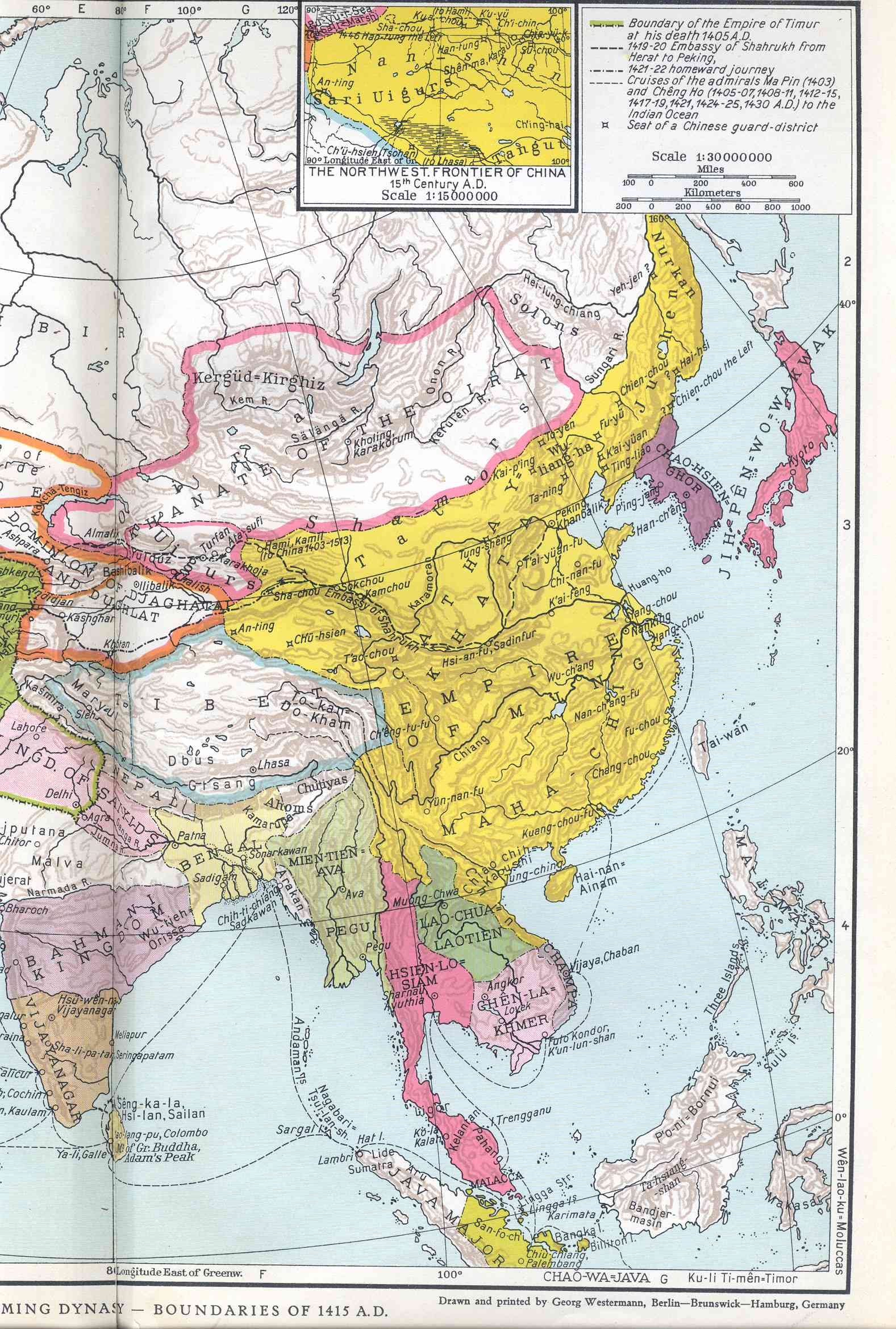
Post-Imperial Mongolia in the early 15th century, surrounded by the Ming Empire and its tributaries

Öljei Temür Khan (Mongolian: Өлзий Төмөр Хаан ᠥᠯᠵᠡᠶᠢᠲᠡᠮᠦᠷ; Chinese: 完者帖木兒汗), born Bunyashiri (Chinese: 本雅失里, Sanskrit: प्रज्ञा श्री), (1379–1412) was a khagan of the Northern Yuan dynasty, reigning from 1408 to 1412. He was a son of Elbeg Nigülesügchi Khan and successor of Gün Temür Khan. He was one of the Borjigin princes, such as Tokhtamysh and Temür Qutlugh, backed by Timur to seize the throne.

== Early life ==
Tsagaan Sechen tells that Bunyashiri (Buyanshir) was born in 1379. Twenty years after his birth, his father, Elbeg, was murdered by the Oirats led by Bahamu and Ugetchi Khashikha. Later, Öljei Temür came to Central Asia after 1399. In 1402, Gün Temür Khan was killed by Örüg Temür Khan or Guilichi in the struggle for the crown.

=== Conversion to Islam ===
Due to internal struggles of the Mongols, the infant prince, Bunyashiri, fled to Beshbalik where Timur's governor stationed. Timur ordered his governor to receive him kindly. Bunyashiri converted to Islam while he stayed at the court of Timur in Samarkand, thus making Öljei Temür Khan one of the very notable converts to Islam from the house of Kublai Khan.

=== Abolishing the "Great Yuan" dynastic title by Guilichi ===
However, Örüg Temür Khan or Guilichi's victory was short-lived when he made several grave miscalculations. The History of Ming says he replaced the Khagan title with a "Tatar Khan", alienating many other Mongol clans that were not "Tatar". Örüg Temür Khan also abolished the name "Great Yuan" (the official name of the former Yuan dynasty), because he needed to show friendly and subordinating gestures towards the Ming dynasty so that he could consolidate his power and conquer other Mongol clans. This move was totally unacceptable to most if not all Mongols who wanted to recover their former glory and retake China proper by defeating the Ming Empire, which originally began as rebellions against the Yuan.

== Rise of Bunyashiri ==
Taking the opportunity, Bunyashiri declared himself the new Khan with the title of Öljei Temür (Өлзий төмөр) at Beshbalik in 1403 and most Mongol clans soon rallied to his side. Arughtai of the Asud acknowledged his suzerainty and was made chingsang (grand chancellor) to him. Oljei Temür Khan Bunyashiri's direct linkage of Genghis Khan line only further strengthened his position: though Örüg Temür Khan declared himself as Khan, his claim was not recognized by most Mongol clans. The Ming court stepped up its divide and rule tactics on Northern Yuan Mongols by dispatching a eunuch, Wan An, to help Bunyashiri. Örüg Temür Khan Guilichi was soon defeated and although Guilichi's son continued to carry on the struggle for the position of the khan all the way till his death in 1425, they were never able to pose any serious threat to Bunyashiri's force, whose main enemy was the Ming Empire.

In 1409, the Ming court bestowed upon the Oirat leaders the title of wang (王; vassal king or prince), exacerbating the Mongol–Oirat conflict. Öljei Temür Khan attacked the Four Oirats and failed to subjugate his stubborn subjects.

After hearing of a new Borjigin ruler consolidating his power over the Mongols, the Yongle Emperor of the Ming Empire demanded Öljei Temür Khan to submit. The Mongol court decided to decline it and detained the Ming envoy. Arughtai executed another Ming envoy in 1409. A punitive expedition of the Ming Empire led by Qiu Fu (丘福) was crushed and the general and several other commanders lost their lives at the hand of Arughtai on 23 September 1409.

== War against Ming dynasty ==
In response to the defeat of the Ming forces led by Qiu Fu, the enraged Yongle Emperor gathered a half-a-million-strong force to launch a decisive campaign against Öljei Temür Khan Bunyashiri. Before the battle, Öljei Temür Khan and Arughtai could not agree on a plan of action and simply moved in different directions. Arughtai decided to withdraw to the east of Mongolia while Öljei Temür Khan Bunyashiri headed west and set up his ordo (palace) on the banks of the Onon River. He was suddenly forced to accept a battle in which the Ming army won a resounding victory by nearly completely wiping out his entire army on 15 June 1410. Öljei Temür Khan Bunyashiri was barely able to escape with his life with only seven horsemen and his son while all the rest were lost. He was trying to reach the Chagatai Khanate where he grew up. Capitalizing on the Khan's mistake, the Oirat leader, Mahamud, killed him in 1412 and installed his own puppet khan, Delbeg (or Dalbag), on the throne in 1413. The death of Öljei Temür Khan Bunyashiri marked the temporary decline of the Borjigin line, and different Mongol clans fought each other for dominance.

== See also ==
- List of Northern Yuan khans

Öljei Temür Khan House of Borjigin Died: 1412
Regnal titles
| Preceded by Örüg Temür Khan | Khagan of the Northern Yuan dynasty 1408–1412 | Succeeded by Delbeg Khan |
