= Elbeg Nigülesügchi Khan =

Nigülesügchi Khan ᠨᠢᠭᠦᠯᠡᠰᠦᠭᠴᠢ ᠬᠠᠭᠠᠨ
- Khagan of the Mongols
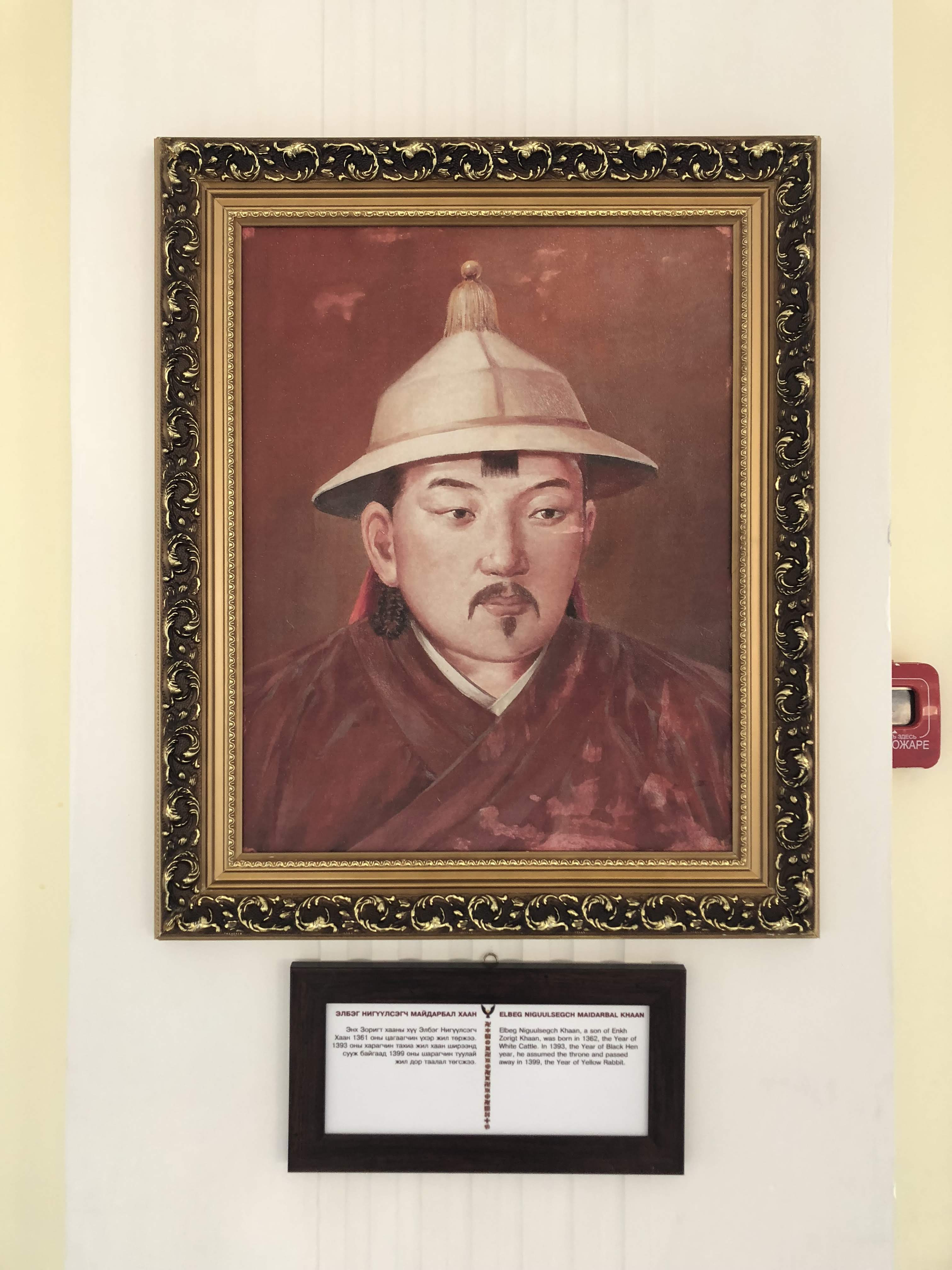

Khagan of the Northern Yuan dynasty
- Reign: 1394–1399
- Coronation: 1394
- Predecessor: Engke Khan
- Successor: Gün Temür Khan
- Born: 1360
- Died: 1399 (aged 38–39)
- Consort: Kobeguntai
- Consort: Oljeitu the Beautiful lady
Full name
- Given name: Elbeg
- House: Borjigin
- Dynasty: Northern Yuan

Nigülesügchi Khan, (Note: Mongolian: Нигүүлсэгч Хаан, romanized: Nigüülsegch Khaan, pronounced [niɣúːɬsɘxt͡ɕʰ χaːɴ]; lit. 'Merciful Emperor'; Classical Mongolian: ᠨᠢᠭᠦᠯᠡᠰᠦᠭᠴᠢ ᠬᠠᠭᠠᠨ [ˈnig̊ylĕsyg̊tʃʰĭ ˈqʰaɣăŋ]; Chinese: 尼古埒蘇克齊汗; pinyin: Nígǔlièsūkèqí Hàn) born Elbeg (Note: Mongolian: Элбэг [eɮpɘk]; Classical Mongolian: ᠡᠯᠪᠡᠭ [ˈelb̥eg̊]; Chinese: 額勒伯克; pinyin: Élēibókè) (1360–1399), was a khagan of the Northern Yuan dynasty, reigning from 1394 to 1399. Erdeniin Tobchi claimed that Elbeg was the younger brother of the Jorightu Khan, while other historians testify that he was a son of the Biligtü Khan (Emperor Zhaozong). He ruled for seven years. Border skirmishes with the Ming dynasty and Oirat rebellion plagued his reign.

== Reign ==
During his reign, the Oirats began to openly challenge the authority of the Borjigin family and the Ming dynasty repulsed Northern Yuan invasions. Elbeg was held responsible for all things that went wrong.

Elbeg was hunting with Khuuhai Dayuu and saw hare's blood on the freshly fallen snow. He mused: "Is there a lady with a face white as snow and cheeks as red as blood?" Khuuhai responded: "I know just such a beautiful lady. It is forbidden for you to see her, as she is Oljeitu, the wife of your son." The Khan ordered Khuuhai to bring the lady to him. When the Khuuhai informed the princess of the summons, she was greatly angered, for she knew the evil intent in the Khan's heart. She refused to go. The Khan then killed his son Duurentemur and made his daughter-in-law his consort. But Khuuhai was also killed by Elbeg Khan.

To prevent hostilities from the Khuuhai Dayuu's family, he gave his daughter Samur Gunj in marriage to the Khuuhai Dayuu's son Batula.

Ugetchi Khashikha, who was ruler of the Oirads at the time, resisted the Khagan's decision to appoint a new ruler over his tribes. He persuaded Batula that the violent khan who had killed his own kin was not fit to be Emperor. Batula wanted to avenge the death of his father as well.

In 1399 Elbeg Nigülesügchi Khagan was defeated by the Four Oirats and was killed by their leaders, Ugetchi Khashikha and Batula, as a result. According to Saghang Sechen, his crown was succeeded by Gün Temür Khan after his death. Allied with the late khan's principal consort Kobeguntai, who was jealous of Elbeg's issue with Oljeitu, Ugetchi Khashikha seized his harem and all his properties.

== Issue ==
- Kobeguntai Khatun (庫伯袞岱哈屯)
  - Princess Samur (萨穆尔公主, d.1455), 1st daughter
    - Married Mahamu, Prince Shunning (顺宁王 马哈木) of the Oirat Chuoluosi clan 绰罗斯氏) and had issue (one son)
- Concubine Oljeitu (鄂勒哲依圖鴻郭斡妣吉), widow of his brother
  - Crown prince Duurentemur (都令帖木儿太子), 1st son
    - Ajai (阿寨)
      - Taisun khan
      - Agbarjin
      - Manduul khan
- Unknown
  - Bunayashiri (本雅失里), 2nd son, laterally Öljei Temür Khagan
  - Gün Temür Khan (disputed)

== See also ==
- List of khans of the Northern Yuan dynasty
- Maidilibala

== Notes ==
Elbeg Nigülesügchi Khan House of Borjigin Died: 1399
Regnal titles
Preceded by Engke Khan	Khagan of the Northern Yuan dynasty 1394–1399	Succeeded by Gün Temür Khan
