= Engke Khan =

Engke ᠡᠩᠬᠡ
- Khagan of the Mongols

Khagan of the Northern Yuan dynasty
- Reign: 1391–1394
- Coronation: 1388
- Predecessor: Jorightu Khan Yesüder
- Successor: Elbeg Nigülesügchi Khan
- Born: 1350
- Died: 1394 (aged 43–44)
- House: Borjigin
- Dynasty: Northern Yuan
- Father: Jorightu Khan Yesüder

Engke (Mongolian: Энх ᠡᠩᠬᠡ; Chinese: 恩克), (1350–1394) was a khagan of the Northern Yuan dynasty, reigning for a brief period from 1391 to 1394. The identity of Engke is the subject of an academic dispute: according to Persian history books that Jorightu Khan was Yesüder and Engke was Yesüder's son succeeding him, while Saghang Sechen believe that the Jorightu and Engke were the same person. Although the Ming Dynasty did not know the history of Mongolia during the reign of Tögüs Temür to Gün Temür, Yongle Emperor claimed that there were five khans during this period, confirming that Jorightu and Engke were two generations. His name "Engke" means "Peaceful" in the Mongolian language.

According to Mongolian historian J. Bor, Engke made an alliance with Timur against the Ming dynasty. However, Timur died while he was marching towards the Ming dynasty in 1405.

== See also ==
- List of khans of the Northern Yuan dynasty

Engke Khan House of Borjigin Died: 1394
Regnal titles
Preceded by Jorightu Khan Yesüder	Khagan of the Northern Yuan dynasty 1391–1394	Succeeded by Elbeg Nigülesügchi Khan
