= Wang Zhong (Ming dynasty) =

Chinese marquis

- Chinese: 王忠
- Hanyu Pinyin: Wáng Zhōng
- Wade–Giles: Wang^{2} Chung^{1}

Wang Zhong (王忠; d. 23 September 1409) was a Chinese marquis under the Yongle Emperor of the Ming dynasty. He was killed—along the marquises Wang Cong, Li Yuan, and Qoryocin as well as the duke Qiu Fu—during a Mongol ambush on Qiu Fu's impetuous cavalry attack on retreating Mongols.
