= Xia Yuanji =

Chinese official (1366–1430)

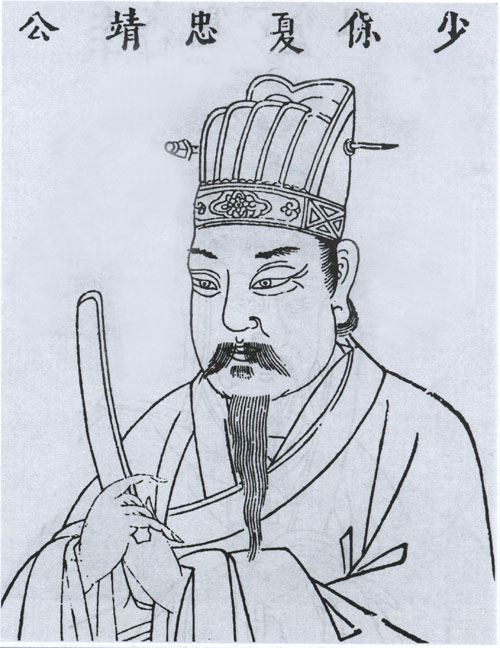
Xia Yuanji's Portrait

Xia Yuanji (Chinese: 夏原吉; 1366–1430) was a Ming dynasty government minister. He was born in Xiangyin County, Hunan Province, which was then part of Huguang Province. His ancestral home was Dexing, Jiangxi. Xia read the Classic of Poetry and became a Xiucai at the age of 23, joining the Guozijian. Early in his career, he saw service under the Hongwu Emperor and Jianwen Emperor. After the Yongle Emperor came to the throne, he was sent to inspect Suzhou Creek. Xia opposed both Zheng He's overseas voyages and the Yongle Emperor's campaigns against the Mongols.

In 1421, Xia Yuanji was imprisoned for voicing his opposition against the Yongle Emperor's decision to undertake the third Mongol military campaign, which would add another expenditure to the existing ones.

After the advice of Xia Yuanji, the Hongxi Emperor ordered the cessation of the Ming treasure voyages on 7 September 1424, the day of his accession to the throne. On 8 September 1424, he released Xia Yuanji from his imprisonment. When the succeeding Xuande Emperor ordered the seventh voyage, he went against the general court opinion. This was after the death of Xia Yuanji, a prominent critic of the maritime expeditions, on 19 February 1430.

== Bibliography ==
- Chan, Hok-lam (1998). "The Chien-wen, Yung-lo, Hung-hsi, and Hsüan-te reigns, 1399–1435". The Cambridge History of China, Volume 7: The Ming Dynasty, 1368–1644, Part 1. Cambridge: Cambridge University Press. ISBN 9780521243322.
- Dreyer, Edward L. (2007). Zheng He: China and the Oceans in the Early Ming Dynasty, 1405–1433. New York: Pearson Longman. ISBN 9780321084439.
- Duyvendak, J. J. L. (1939). "The True Dates of the Chinese Maritime Expeditions in the Early Fifteenth Century". T'oung Pao. 34 (5): 341–413. doi:10.1163/156853238X00171. JSTOR 4527170.
