= List of Northern Yuan khans =

The following is a list of khagans of the Northern Yuan Dynasty (1368–1388) and the Period of small khans (Döchin Dörben, 1388–1635) based in Northern China and the Mongolian Plateau.

== Northern Yuan Dynasty ==
Names by which most commonly known	Temple names (Miào Hào 廟號)	Posthumous names (Shì Hào 諡號)	Regnal names (Zūn Hào 尊號)	Birth names	Reign	Era names (Nián Hào 年號) and their according range of years
Toghon Temür	Huizong (惠宗 Huìzōng) (same person as the last Yuan emperor in China proper)	Emperor Xuanren Puxiao (宣仁普孝皇帝 Xuānrén Pǔxiào Huángdì) (bestowed by Northern Yuan) Emperor Shun (順皇帝 Shùn Huángdì) (bestowed by Ming dynasty)	Ukhaghatu Khan (烏哈噶圖汗 Wūhāgátú Hán)	Borjigin Toghan Temür (孛兒只斤·妥懽貼睦爾 Bó'érjìjǐn Tuǒhuāntiēmù'ěr)	1368–1370	Zhiyuan (至元 Zhìyuán) 1368–1370
Biligtü Khan Ayushiridara	Zhaozong (昭宗 Zhāozōng)	Emperor Wucheng Hexiao (武承和孝皇帝 Wǔchéng Héxiào Huángdì)	Biligtü Khan (必里克圖汗 Bìlǐkètú Hán)	Borjigin Ayushiridara (孛兒只斤·愛育識里達臘 Bó'érjìjǐn Àiyùshílǐdálà)	1370–1378	Xuanguang (宣光 Xuānguāng) 1371–1378
Uskhal Khan Tögüs Temür	Yizong (益宗 Yìzōng) (disputed)	Emperor Yisheng Ningxiao (益聖寧孝皇帝 Yìshèng Níngxiào Huángdì)	Uskhal Khan (兀思哈勒汗 Wùsīhālè Hán)	Borjigin Tögüs Temür (孛兒只斤·脫古思帖木兒 Bó'érjìjǐn Tuōgǔsītiēmù'ér)	1378–1388	Tianyuan (天元 Tiānyuán) 1378–1388

== Later Northern Yuan khans (1388–1635) ==
Names by which most commonly known	Regnal Names	Birth Names	Reign
Jorightu Khan Yesüder	Jorightu Khan (卓里克圖汗 Zhuólǐkètú Hán)	Borjigin Yesüder (孛兒只斤·也速迭兒 Bó'érjìjǐn Yěsùdié'ér)	1388–1391
Engke Khan		Borjigin Engke (孛兒只斤·恩克 Bó'érjìjǐn Ēnkè)	1391–1394
Elbeg Nigülesügchi Khan	Nigülesügchi Khan (尼古埒蘇克齊汗 Nígǔlièsūkèqí Hán)	Borjigin Elbeg (孛兒只斤·額勒伯克 Bó'érjìjǐn Élèbókè)	1394–1399
Gün Temür Khan	Toqoqan Khan (托歡汗 Tuōhuān Hán)	Borjigin Gün Temür (孛兒只斤·坤帖木兒 Bó'érjìjǐn Kūntiēmù'ér)	1399–1402
Örüg Temür Khan		Borjigin Örüg Temür (孛兒只斤·月魯帖木兒 Bó'érjìjǐn Yuèlǔtiēmù'ér) nickname Gulichi (鬼力赤 Guǐlìchì)	1402–1408
Öljei Temür Khan	Öljei Temür Khan (完者帖木兒汗 Wánzhětiēmù'ér Hán)	Borjigin Bunyashiri (孛兒只斤·本雅失里 Bó'érjìjǐn Běnyǎshīlǐ)	1408–1412
Delbeg Khan		Borjigin Delbeg (孛兒只斤·答里巴 Bó'érjìjǐn Dálǐbā)	1412–1415
Oyiradai		Borjigin Oyiradai (孛兒只斤·斡亦剌歹 Bó'érjìjǐn Wòyìládǎi)	1415–1425
Adai Khan		Borjigin Adai (孛兒只斤·阿岱 Bó'érjìjǐn Ādài)	1425–1438
Taisun Khan	Taisun Khan (岱總汗 Dàizǒng Hán)	Borjigin Toghtoa Bukha (孛兒只斤·脫脫不花 Bó'érjìjǐn Tuōtuōbùhuā)	1433–1453
Agbarjin		Borjigin Agbarjin (孛兒只斤·阿噶多爾濟 Bó'érjìjǐn Āgáduō'ěrjì)	1453
Esen Taishi (Leader of the Oirats; usurper)		Choros Esen (綽羅斯·也先 Chuòluósī Yěxiān)	1454–1455
Mahakörgis Khan	Ükegtü Khan (烏珂克圖汗 Wūkēkètú Hán)	Borjigin Mahakörgis (孛兒只斤·馬兒古兒吉思 Bó'érjìjǐn Mǎ'érgǔ'érjísī)	1455–1465
Molon Khan	Molon Khan (摩倫汗 Mólún Hán)	Borjigin Tögüs Mengke (孛兒只斤·脫古思猛可 Bó'érjìjǐn Tuōgǔsīměngkě)	1465–1466
Manduul Khan		Borjigin Manduul (孛兒只斤·滿都魯 Bó'érjìjǐn Mǎndūlǔ)	1475–1478
Dayan Khan	Dayan Khan (達延汗 Dáyán Hán)	Borjigin Batumöngke (孛兒只斤·巴圖蒙克 Bó'érjìjǐn Bātúměngkè)	1479–1517
Bars Bolud Jinong		Borjigin Barsbolad (孛兒只斤·巴爾斯博羅特 Bó'érjìjǐn Bā'ěrsībóluótè)	1517–1519
Bodi Alagh Khan	Alagh Khan (阿剌克汗 Ālákè Hán)	Borjigin Bodi (孛兒只斤·博迪 Bó'érjìjǐn Bódí)	1519–1547
Daraisung Guden Khan	Guden Khan (庫騰汗 Kùténg Hán)	Borjigin Daraisung (孛兒只斤·打來孫 Bó'érjìjǐn Dǎláisūn)	1547–1557
Tümen Zasagt Khan	Zasagt Khan (扎薩克圖汗 Zhāsàkètú Hán)	Borjigin Tümen (孛兒只斤·圖們 Bó'érjìjǐn Túmén)	1558–1592
Buyan Sechen Khan	Sechen Khan (徹辰汗 Chèchén Hán)	Borjigin Buyan (孛兒只斤·布延 Bó'érjìjǐn Bùyán)	1592–1604
Ligdan Khan	Khutugtu Khan (呼圖克圖汗 Hūtúkètú Hán)	Borjigin Ligdan (孛兒只斤·林丹 Bó'érjìjǐn Líndān)	1604–1634
Ejei Khan		Borjigin Erke Khongghor (孛兒只斤·額爾克孔果爾 Bó'érjìjǐn É'ěrkèkǒngguǒ'ěr)	1634–1635

== See also ==
- Borjigin
- List of Yuan emperors
- Yuan dynasty family tree
- List of Chinese monarchs
- List of Mongol rulers
- List of Mongol khatuns
