= Samur Gunj =

Mongol princess (1380s-c.1455)

Samur Gunj (1380s-c.1455) was a daughter of Elbeg Nigülesügchi Khan and his senior wife Kobeguntai. Throughout her life she struggled for the preservation of the Borjigin clan.

== Life ==
Samur's father, Elbeg Khan, killed his brother (some sources say his son), then married the widow of the deceased. He also killed his advisor and military general, Daiyuu . To prevent Daiyuu's family from taking revenge on him, he gave his daughter Samur in marriage to Daiyuu's son, Batula. Samur's husband was given command over the Oirats and made their taishi, or leader. However, both Batula, and his deceased father, had been vassals of Orüg Temür Khan, who was displeased by Elbeg Khan's actions.

Since many of her clan were virtual prisoners of their guards, she convinced first her husband and then her son to launch campaigns to free them. After her son died in these struggles, she convinced her grandson Esen to become taishi. Samur supported him as he brought the Mongolian Plateau and most of the Silk Route under his control.

Though Esen first strove for unity between the Oirats and the Borjigin clan of his grandmother, he later turned against the Borjigin. and had several of its nobles killed. When his own daughter was about to give birth, he also intended to have the baby killed if it turned out to be male. Samur helped her great-granddaughter escape and hide. They first pretended a girl had been born. When it became known that this was not true, Samur took the boy to her ger for protection and finally entrusted him to Mongols loyal to the Borjigins to take him out of Esen's reach. The boy was Bayan-Mongke, who would be a direct ancestor of Dayan Khan.

Samur died around the same time as Esen.

== Sources ==
- Weatherford, Jack. (2010). The Secret History of the Mongol Queens. Broadway Paperbacks, New York.
