= Jorightu Khan Yesüder =

Jorightu Khan ᠵᠣᠷᠢᠭᠲᠤ ᠬᠠᠭᠠᠨ
- Khagan of the Mongols

Khagan of the Northern Yuan dynasty
- Reign: 1388–1391
- Coronation: 1388
- Predecessor: Uskhal Khan Tögüs Temür
- Successor: Engke Khan
- Born: 1358
- Died: 1392 (aged 33–34)
- Issue: Jorightu Khan (Зоригт Хаан)
- House: Borjigin
- Dynasty: Northern Yuan

Jorightu Khan (Mongolian: Зоригт Хаан ᠵᠣᠷᠢᠭᠲᠤ
ᠬᠠᠭᠠᠨ, lit. 'brave king', Chinese: 卓里克圖汗; 1358–1392) was a khagan of the Northern Yuan dynasty, reigning from 1388 to 1391. The identity of Jorightu is disputed: some scholars believe that Jorightu was the same individual as Yesüder (Chinese: 也速迭兒), a descendant of Ariq Böke, and that Engke Khan was Yesüder's son succeeding him; while according to Erdeniin Tobchi, Jorigthu Khan and Engke Khan were the same person with different titles. His title, "Jorightu Khagan", means "Brave Emperor" in the Mongolian language.

After the murder of Uskhal Khan by Yesüder after the events of the Battle of Buir Lake, the unified Mongol tribes quickly disintegrated. Gunashiri, a descendant of Chagatai Khan, founded the state of Kara Del in Hami, in modern Xinjiang. Uskhal Khan's former minister, Necelai, submitted to the Ming dynasty in 1389 and the Ming established a Mongol guard of Tyuanin (also known as Three Guards) under him in Daiying, modern Inner Mongolia. However, the late khan's chingsang, Shirmen, allied with Yesüder, killed Necelai.

The former prince of Liao (Liaodong) and one of the leaders of the Three Guards, Ajashir, changed their allegiance to Yesüder some time after 1389.

== See also ==
- List of khans of the Northern Yuan dynasty

Jorightu Khan Yesüder House of Borjigin Died: 1391
Regnal titles
Preceded by none, Uskhal Khan Tögüs Temür as Emperor of the Northern Yuan	Khagan of the Northern Yuan; 1388–1391	Succeeded by Engke Khan
