= Khorchin Mongols =

Easternmost group of Mongols

- Territories of the Khorchin in 1911

Regions with significant populations
- China: 1,439,000 (2015)

Languages
- Khorchin dialect of Mongolian

Religion
- Tibetan Buddhism

Related ethnic groups
- Mongols, Mongols in China

The Khorchin (Mongolian: ᠬᠤᠷᠴᠢᠨ; Хорчин; Qorčin/Horchin; simplified Chinese: 科尔沁部; traditional Chinese: 科爾沁部) are a subgroup of the Mongols that speak the Khorchin dialect of Mongolian and predominantly live in northeastern Inner Mongolia of China.

== History ==
The Ming dynasty gave Borjigin princes (descended from Genghis Khan's brothers) command of the Taining Guard, one of the Three Guards established in 1389. In 1446-48 most of the guards fled in the wake of Esen Tayisi's invasions. However, the Fuyu Guard, another of the Three Guards, remained along the Nen and Onon rivers. Said to have been the descendants of Khasar, a brother of Genghis Khan, they became the direct ancestors of the Khorchin Mongols.

Adai Khan of the Khorchin challenged the power of the Four Oirats and the Ming court in the succession struggle of Northern Yuan dynasty. However, he was killed by them in Ejene in 1438 and his tribe was forced to flee southward. The Khorchin appeared again in Mongolian chronicles with the rise of Unebolad wang in the late 15th century. The Khorchins allied with Dayan Khan and defeated the Uriyangkhai at the battle of Dalan Terqin in 1510.

In 1624, Nurhaci received the submission of Khorchins who roamed east of Khingan mountains and west of the Sungari. They were the first Mongol tribe that submitted to Qing dynasty. The Khorchins were responsible for production of fermented mare's milk for Manchu emperors. The later emperors of the Manchu Qing dynasty rewarded the Khorchin nobles highly for this early loyalty. Notable Empresses of the Qing dynasty, such as Empress Xiaozhuangwen (1613–88) and Empress Xiaohuizhang (1641–1717), were the Khorchin-Borjigins. The Khorchins were further divided into two wings (north and south), each with three Banners.

Due to the anti-Mongol rebellion among ethnic Han Jindandao followers in 1891, many thousands of Kharchin Mongols fled to the Khorchin. After 1900 both Chinese education and Chinese influence spread among them. When the Japanese Empire occupied parts of Inner Mongolia and all of Manchuria in 1931, the Khorchins leaders became the puppets of the Japanese Empire. After World War II rural class struggle and the civil war of 1946–48 were very bloody and divisive. Since then they have been a powerful faction within Inner Mongolia's Chinese Communist Party apparatus.

== Popular culture ==
Korchin is a playable nation in the grand strategy game Europa Universalis IV.

Khorchin is a playable nation in the grand strategy game Age of History 2, where its capital is Baicheng.

== Sources ==
- Narangoa, Li (2014). Historical Atlas of Northeast Asia, 1590-2010: Korea, Manchuria, Mongolia, Eastern Siberia. New York: Columbia University Press. ISBN 9780231160704.
