= Uskhal Khan Tögüs Temür =

Emperor of Northern Yuan from 1378 to 1388

Tianyuan Emperor of Northern Yuan 北元天元帝 Uskhal Khan 兀思哈勒汗 ᠤᠰᠬᠠᠯ ᠬᠠᠭᠠᠨ
- Emperor of the Great Yuan

Emperor of the Northern Yuan dynasty
- Reign: May 1378 – November 1388
- Coronation: May 1378
- Predecessor: Biligtü Khan Ayushiridara
- Successor: Jorightu Khan Yesüder
- Born: 1342
- Died: 18 November 1388 (aged 46); Tuul River, Northern Yuan dynasty
Names
- Mongolian: ᠲᠡᠭᠦᠰᠲᠡᠮᠦᠷ; Chinese: 脫古思帖木兒; Tögüs Temür
Era dates
- Xuanguang (宣光): 1378–1379; Tianyuan (天元): 1379–1388
Regnal name
- Uskhal Khan (兀思哈勒汗)
Posthumous name
- None
Temple name
- None, some sources claimed Yizong (益宗)
- House: Borjigin
- Dynasty: Northern Yuan
- Father: Ukhaghatu Khan Toghon Temür

Uskhal Khan (Mongolian: Усхал Хаан; Mongolian script: ᠤᠰᠬᠠᠯ; Chinese: 兀思哈勒汗), also called the Last Lord of Northern Yuan (Chinese: 北元末主) or by his era name the Tianyuan Emperor (Chinese: 天元帝), born Tögüs Temür (Chinese: 脫古思帖木兒; 7 March 1342 – 18 November 1388), was an emperor of the Northern Yuan dynasty, reigning from 1378 to 1388. He was the last powerful khagan of the Mongols until Dayan Khan.

Tögüs Temür was the younger brother of Biligtü Khan (Emperor Zhaozong) and son of Toghon Temür (Emperor Huizong), the last Yuan emperor. Before ascending to the Northern Yuan throne, he held the noble title of Prince of Yi (益王). He succeeded to the throne with the title of Uskhal Khan after Biligtü Khan died in 1378. During the funeral of the late emperor, the Ming court sent an mission to participate in it and released the Northern Yuan prince, Maidarbal, who had been captured at the battle of Yingchang in 1378.

Uskhal Khan Tögüs Temür mobilized troops near Yingchang and Karakorum. He continued to press the Ming dynasty from the north, cooperating with Naghachu of the Jalayir in Manchuria. The Ming launched a massive attack on the Northern Yuan in return in 1380, sacking Karakorum.

The Ming army crushed the Northern Yuan garrison under Iliyasan in northern China in June 1380. Uskhal Khan's commanders, Öljei-Buqa and Nair-Buqa, invaded Lulun city, killing the Ming officer Liu Guang in the same year. The Ming dispatched a large army against the Northern Yuan the next year.

The Hongwu Emperor of the Ming dynasty decided to exterminate Naghachu's force in Manchuria in 1387 and two sides suffered heavier losses at a battle near Changchun city. Tögüs Temür suddenly faced a predicament in 1387 when Naghachu surrendered to the Ming due to a devastating famine. The Ming now turned their attention to the Uskhal Khan Tögüs Temür who lived in Yingchang. In 1388, he was raided by the Ming on the Buir Lake. In his escape to Karakorum, he was suddenly attacked and defeated on the Tuul River by Yesüder, a descendant of Ariq Böke, who allied with the Oirats. Yesüder's general killed the king and his son. Uskhal Khan had intended to flee westwards to join his commander Markhas. This event marked the decline of the Kublaid power and the rise of the Oirats on the Mongolian Plateau.

== See also ==
- List of khans of the Northern Yuan dynasty

Uskhal Khan Tögüs Temür House of Borjigin Died: 1388
Regnal titles
Preceded by Biligtü Khan, Emperor Zhaozong	Emperor of the Northern Yuan dynasty 1378–1388	Succeeded by None, Jorightu Khan Yesüder as Khan
