= Saghang Sechen =

Mongol writer, historian, and Borjigin prince (1604–1641)

- Born: Saghang Sechen Qong Tayiji; 1604; Ordos (present day Inner Mongolia, China)
- Died: after 1641
- Occupation: Writer
- Writing career
- Notable work: Erdeniin Tobchi

Saghang Sechen (Note: Mongolian: Саган сэцэн хунтайж, romanized: Sagan secen khuntaij, pronounced [saʁə̆ɴ set͡sʰɘ̆ɴ χʊntʰɛ́ːt͡ɕ]; Classical Mongolian (transcription): Saghang Sechen Qong Tayiji, IPA: [ˈsaɣăŋ ˈsetʃʰĕn qʰoŋ ˈtʰajĭdʒĭ]) (1604 – after 1641) was an ethnic Mongol writer, historian, and prince from the Borjigin clan.

He is primarily remembered for writing Erdeniin Tobchi (1662), a history of the Mongol great Khans which was written to promote unity among the Mongols. He also wrote a number of biographies, covering Godan Khan and the Shakyamuni Buddha. The historian was reputedly executed by the Qing dynasty for refusing to become their subject.

== Early life ==
Saghang Sechen was an ethnic Mongol born into the Ordos tribe, the son of the Ordos Bat Khüngtaij. He was a nephew of Altan Khan. When he was just 17, Saghang Sechen became a military and administrative aide to Ligden Khan. The latter entitled him Setsen Khüngtaij.

== Work ==
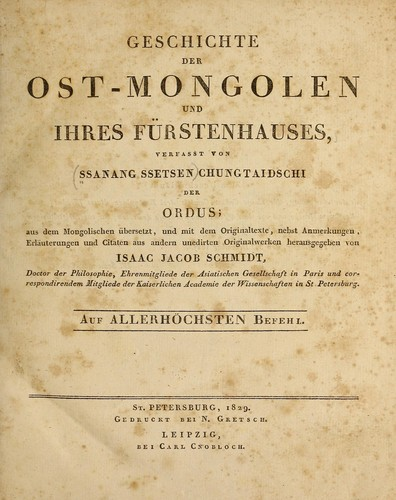
Front-page of a 1829 German edition of the History of the Eastern Mongol by Sechen

He is best known as the author of the Erdeniin Tobchi ('Jeweled Summary'), which was published in 1662. The work is a history of the Mongol great Khans, and came as part of a struggle for unity among the Mongols, and renewal of their literature.

The work has some anecdotes also found in the early-13th-century The Secret History of the Mongols and in Guush Luvsandanzan's Altan Tobchi or Khadyn ündsen khuraangui Altan tovch nert sudar orshivoi ('Short History of the Origins of the Khans Called the Golden Summary'), also written in the early 17th century. In his work there are also citations from the Shar Tuuj (Sir-a tuguji, 'Yellow Story'), written as on ode to Dayan Khan in the 17th century by an anonymous author. It tells the story of the capture of Gürbeljin-gua ('Beautiful lizard'), queen of Tangut, whose husband (Tangut Khan) had been murdered by Genghis Khan after he destroyed their kingdom, the Tangut state. The story tells that before giving herself to Genghis Khan, she placed a pair of tweezers inside herself, which caused a fatal injury to Genghis Khan. She then drowned herself into the Yellow River. The work of Saghang Sechen has a strong folkloric note.

He further wrote biographies of Godan Khan, the grandson of Genghis Khan, and of Shakyamuni Buddha.

Beside the literary value of his works, as an historian, he is said to have greatly contributed to the study of Mongol history.

== Death ==
According to one source, he refused to become a subject under the Manchu of the Qing dynasty and was sentenced to death by dismemberment.
