= Asud =

Military group of Alani origin

Asuds
Regions with significant populations
- Mongolia and Inner Mongolia

Languages
- Mongolian, formerly Alanic (extinct)

Related ethnic groups
- Ossetians, Jasz

The Asud (Mongolian Cyrillic: Асуд, IPA: /ˈasʊt/) were a military group of Alani origin. The Mongol clan Asud is the plural of As, the Arabic name for the Alans.

Against the Alans and the Cumans (Kipchaks), the Mongols used divide and conquer tactics by first telling the Cumans to stop allying with the Alans and after the Cumans followed their suggestion the Mongols then attacked the Cumans after defeating the Alans. Alans were recruited into the Mongol forces with one unit called "Right Alan Guard" which was combined with "recently surrendered" soldiers, Mongols, and Chinese soldiers stationed in the area of the former Kingdom of Qocho and in Besh Balikh the Mongols established a Chinese military colony led by Chinese general Qi Kongzhi (Ch'i Kung-chih). Alan and Kipchak guards were used by Kublai Khan. In 1368 at the end of the Yuan dynasty in China Toghan Temür was accompanied by his faithful Alan guards. Mangu enlisted in his bodyguard half the troops of the Alan prince, Arslan, whose younger son Nicholas took a part in the expedition of the Mongols against Karajang (Yunnan). This Alan imperial guard was still in existence in 1272, 1286 and 1309, and it was divided into two corps with headquarters in the Ling Pei province (Karakorúm). In 1254 Rubruquis found a Russian deacon amongst the other Christians at Karakoram. The reason why the earlier Persian word tersa was gradually abandoned by the Mongols in favour of the Syro - Greek word arkon, when speaking of Christians, manifestly is that no specifically Greek Church was ever heard of in China until the Russians had been conquered; besides, there were large bodies of Russian and Alan guards at Peking throughout the last half of the thirteenth and first half of the fourteenth century, and the Catholics there would not be likely to encourage the use of a Persian word which was most probably applicable in the first instance to the Nestorians they found so degenerated. The Alan guards converted to Catholicism as reported by Odorico. Alans were converted to Roman Catholic Christianity in addition to Armenians in China by John of Montecorvino.

After the Mongol invasion of Rus, many Alans submitted to the Mongol Empire. Some of them resisted the Golden Horde longer. Many warriors moved from Northern Caucasia to Mongolia. It is also claimed that they helped their new masters to fight against the Circassians and that they participated in the Mongol invasion of Europe. Under the rule of Möngke Khan, many were brought east to fight against the Chinese Song Dynasty and Kingdom of Dali in Yunnan in 1258-1259. The Alan imperial guard was divided into two corps with headquarters in Karakorum.

After the coronation of Kublai Khan, those Alans participated in the campaign against Ariq Böke and later Qaidu under the Yuan Dynasty. They suffered heavy losses from Song resistance when they were under the command of Bayan of the Baarin and Aju.

Kublai Khan organized them into the Jasin guard (Alan guard) of 3,000 soldiers around 1271, along with some of the Kipchaks. The Alani guard reached its peak during the reign of Tugh Temür and their number expanded to 30,000. During the 15-16th centuries, they formed part of the Yungshebiyu tumen in central Inner Mongolia and the Asud were large tribe of Southern Mongolia.

Today, there are few people with the clan name Asud in Ar Khorchin banner, Inner Mongolia. Mongolian Asuds live in Ulaanbaatar, Dundgovi, Töv and other aimags.

== See also ==
- Kharchin
- Alania
