= Erdeniin Tobchi =

17th-century Mongolian chronicle by Saghan Sechen

The Erdeniin Tobchi (Note: Mongolian: Хаадын үндэсний эрдэнийн товч, romanized: Khaadiin ündesnii erdeniin tovch, pronounced [χáːtiːɴ untɘ̆sníː ertɘ̆níːɴ tʰɔw̜t͡ɕʰ]; lit. 'National Jeweled Summary of the Khans'; Classical Mongolian: ᠬᠠᠳ ᠤᠨ ᠦᠨᠳᠦᠰᠦᠨ ᠦ ᠡᠷᠳᠡᠨᠢ ᠶᠢᠨ ᠲᠣᠪᠴᠢ, Qad-un ündüsün-ü erdeni-yin tobchi, [ˈqʰad̥.uŋ ˈynd̥y̆sy̆n.y ˈerd̥ĕnĭ.jin ˈtʰob̥tʃʰĭ]) is a national chronicle of the Mongols written by Saghang Sechen in 1662.

== Publication history ==
The Erdeniin Tobchi is commonly called The Chronicles of Sagang Sechen. A first translation into a western language (German) was published by the Moravian missionary Isaac Jacob Schmidt in 1829. The first translation into English was by John Krueger, as The Bejeweled Summary of the Origin of the Khan: A History of the Eastern Mongols to 1662. It was further translated in 2023 by Johan Elverskog as The Precious Summary: A History of the Mongols from Chinggis Khan to the Qing Dynasty.

== Reception ==
It is generally regarded by nearly all ancient Mongolists as a primary source of accurate Mongol history. The names in this work were reputed to be uncorrupted. Erdeniin Tobchi's records of Mongol rulers were so different from Altan Tobchi in Mongolian and Habib al-siyar, Zafarnama in Persian that modern Mongolists consider Saghang Sechen's records to be inaccurate.

== See also ==
- Altan Debter
- Altan Tobchi
- The Secret History of the Mongols
