= Arughtai =

Arughtai, also known as Alutai (Chinese: 阿魯台; Wade–Giles: A-lu-t’ai; d. 1434), was a chingsang of the Northern Yuan dynasty who fought against the Yongle Emperor of the Ming dynasty and the Four Oirats.

According to the Mongolian and Chinese chronicles, there are similar named figures among the Western and Eastern Mongols. One of them named Asud Arugtai was a war prisoner of the Oirats, who was released by the Borjigin princess Samur while another person, Alutai, raided the Ming districts. Whatever his origin, the Oirad leaders, Gulichi and Mahamud, overthrew Elbeg Khan in 1399; and the former had himself enthroned as Khagan who appointed Arugtai or Alutai chingsang (councillor). However, Mahamud and Arughtai defeated Ugetchi or Gulichi; and Mahamud himself died soon after that.

Map of Ming campaign against Bunyashiri Khan and Arughtai.

In 1409 Alutai (Arughtai) set up the heir, Öljei Temür Khan Bunyashiri, of the Northern Yuan dynasty at Beshbalik, and ignored Ming demands for satisfaction regarding the murder of an envoy in the previous year. War followed, in which at first Alutai was successful, owing to the rashness of the Ming dynasty; but in the following year he was beaten and fled. In 1413, for promising help against the Oirads, he received the title of Prince of Hening (和寧王) and sent a mission to the Ming dynasty. Beaten by the Oirads, he sought refuge on the Ming frontier; but as soon as his strength increased, he renewed his raids. The Emperor marched against him in 1422, 1423, and 1424, but Alutai never risked a pitched battle and supported Adai Khan against the Oirads. Ten years later he was surprised and slain by Oirads under Toghan (Esen's father), and his son submitted to the Ming dynasty.

== See also ==
- Yongle Emperor's campaigns against the Mongols
