= Ariq Böke =

Khan of the Mongol Empire from 1259 to 1264

Arik Böke; ᠠᠷᠢᠭᠪᠦᠬᠡ
- Khagan of the Mongol Empire (Note: Nominal due to the empire's division)
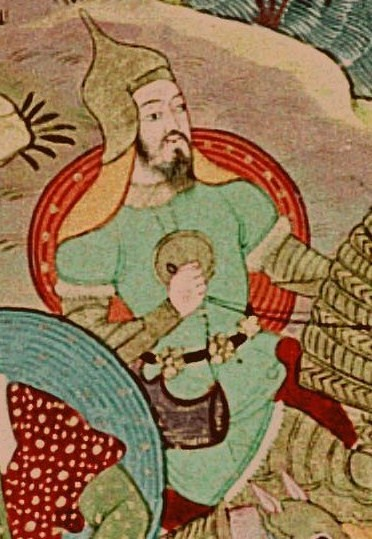
- Depiction 1596

Great Khan of the Mongol Empire
- Reign: 11 August 1259 – 21 August 1264
- Predecessor: Möngke Khan
- Successor: Kublai Khan
- Born: c. 1219; Mongol Empire
- Died: 1266 (aged 46–47)
- Spouse: Elchiqmash Khatun; Qutiqta Khatun; Qutlu Khatun; Iraghui Khatun; Eshitai Khatun
- Issue: Yubuqur, Meliktemur, Tamachi, Nayirbukha, Haluhan Ahai, Neguder ahai, Nomuhan Ahai
Names
- Given name: Arigböh (Аригбөх)
- House: Borjigin
- Father: Tolui Khan
- Mother: Sorghaghtani Beki
- Religion: Tengrism

Ariq Böke (Note: Mongolian: Аригбөх, romanized: Arigböh, pronounced [ǽrɪ̆ɢ.pɵx]; Chinese: 阿里不哥; pinyin: Ālǐ Bùgē) (c. 1219–1266) was the seventh and youngest son of Tolui and a grandson of Genghis Khan. After the death of his brother the Great Khan Möngke, Ariq Böke claimed the title of the Great Khan of the Mongol Empire and briefly took power while his brothers Kublai and Hulagu were absent from the Mongolian Plateau. When Kublai returned for an election in 1260, rival factions could not agree, and elected both claimants, Kublai and Ariq Böke, to the throne, resulting in the Toluid Civil War that fragmented the Mongol Empire. Ariq Böke was supported by the traditionalists of the Mongol Empire, while his brother Kublai was supported by the senior princes of North China and Manchuria.

== Early years ==
Ariq Böke was the youngest son of Sorghaghtani Beki and Tolui, the youngest son of Genghis Khan. When Genghis died in 1227, the leadership of the Empire passed to Genghis' third son (Ariq Böke's uncle), Ögedei. He peacefully attended the elections of both his uncle, Great Khan Ögedei and Ögedei's successor and eldest son, Güyük. After his eldest brother Möngke was enthroned in 1250, his family became even more powerful among the Genghisid. His mother was Christian and Ariq Böke was also known for being sympathetic towards Christianity; this is known from the account of Franciscan William of Rubruck, an envoy of Louis IX of France who wrote that he observed Ariq Böke make the sign of cross and state that "We know that the Messiah [Jesus] is God". A Confucian tutor was arranged for Ariq Böke, at the behest of his elder brother Kublai Khan, but Ariq Böke did not take to Chinese scholars the way his elder brother had.

== Succession struggle ==
=== Great Khan ===
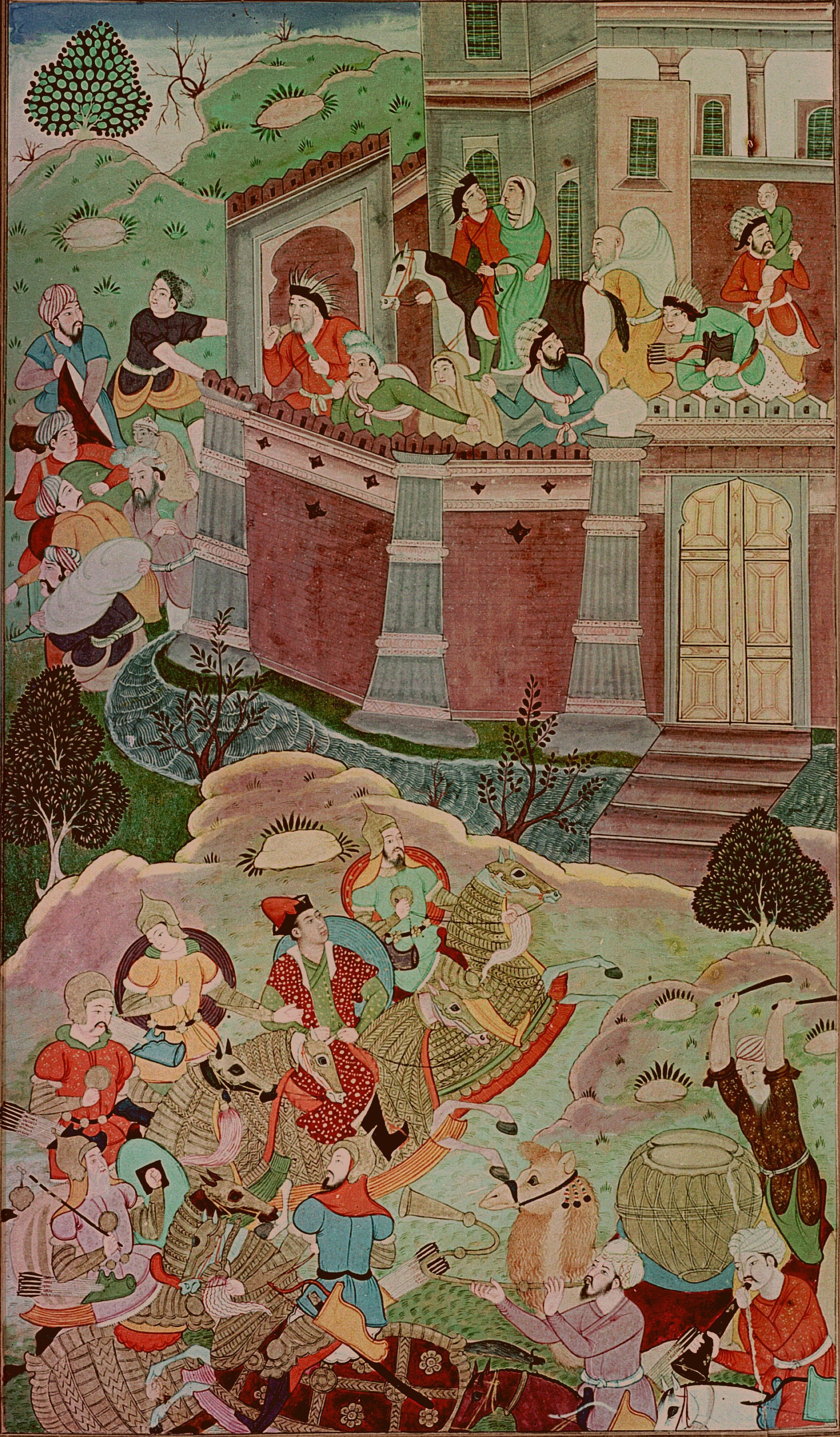
Ariq Böke defeats Alghu-Rashid al'Din, Jami al Tavarikh.

When Ögedei Khan died, a power struggle erupted, with leadership then passing to Ögedei's son Güyük in 1246, though Güyük died only two years later, in 1248. After another struggle, the sons of Tolui, Ögedei's brother, took power. The first of Tolui's sons to be Great Khan was Möngke, who proceeded with Kublai to conquer Southern China and the Southern Song dynasty. Their brother Hulagu led the Mongol advance westward, conquering Baghdad and proceeding into Syria and towards Palestine. During this time, all affairs of the Heartland were left under the control of their brother Ariq Böke.

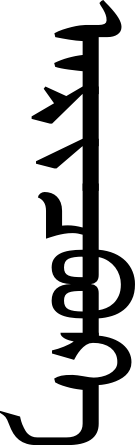
Ariq Böke in traditional Mongolian script.

When Möngke died in 1259, Ariq Böke was elected Khan in the absence of his brothers, and had the support of most of the ministers and powerful families in the capital of Karakorum, such as Möngke's family, and other princes of the Golden Horde family along with other forces in the capital of Karakorum including Torguud royal bodyguards and White Horde elites, as well as the Oirats, who were allied with him as one of the Oirat leaders was married to his daughter. At the kurultai in Mongolia, the members of the families of Genghis Khan’s four sons, including the Blue Horde, Möngke’s wife and sons, the descendants of Genghis’ two brothers, and the Ilkhan Hülegü’s eldest son Jumqur supported Ariq-Böke’s election. However, when Kublai and Hulagu received news of Möngke's death, they aborted their own battles in order to return to the capital to decide the matter of succession. In May 1260, Kublai was elected khan by his own supporters, to rival the claim of Ariq Böke. A civil war subsequently broke out between the brothers for the leadership of the Empire. For example, when the Chagatai Khanate needed a new leader, Kublai attempted to send Abishqa, who was loyal to him. But Ariq Böke had Abishqa captured and eventually killed, and instead installed his own ally Alghu. Ariq Böke started the conscription of new soldiers from the populace, including monks and priests, earlier than Kublai did. Ariq Böke ordered Alghu to defend the area from both the forces of Hulagu, and the possible presence of Berke of the Golden Horde. But Alghu deserted Ariq Böke, killing his envoys for treasure, while Kaidu remained loyal to Ariq Böke. Alghu and Ariq Böke were soon in direct conflict, with Alghu winning the first engagement, but then at the second, Ariq Böke was victorious, and forced Alghu to flee westward.

=== Surrender ===
Eventually, as the war continued between Ariq Böke and his brother Kublai, the former's forces weakened. Kublai had powerful Mongol cavalry troops, Mongolian, Manchurian, Han, Kipchak and numerous Chinese and Goryeo infantry units. Kublai's supporter Kadan, a son of Ögedei, crushed Ariq Böke's force under General Alandar, and Ariq Böke twice lost control of the capital of Karakorum. Kublai also blockaded all trade to Mongolia from North China, in order to cut the food supply. Ariq Böke finally submitted to Kublai in 1264. He was imprisoned by Kublai and died mysteriously a few years after his surrender, leading to rumors that he had been secretly poisoned.

== Legacy ==
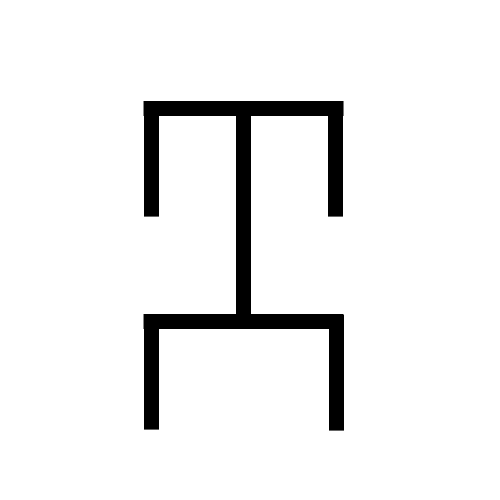
Tamgha of Ariq Böke.

According to scholar David Morgan, "Ariq Böke can be seen as representing an influential school of thought among the Mongols, which Kublai through his actions and attitudes after 1260 opposed. Some Mongols felt there was a dangerous drift towards softness, typified in those like Kublai who thought there was something to be said for settled civilization and for the Chinese way of life. In the traditionalist view, the Mongol center ought to remain in Mongolia, and the Mongols' nomadic life be preserved uncontaminated. China ought merely to be exploited. Ariq Böke came to be regarded as this faction's figurehead." This legacy was continued by Kaidu (Khaidu). Although Ariq Böke lost power, some of his descendants later became important figures in the Ilkhanate and the Northern Yuan dynasty, and the lineage of both Ilkhan Arpa Ke'un and Yesüder can be traced back to Ariq Böke.

== Family ==
Ariq Böke had at least five wives and concubines and nine children.

=== Wives ===
- Ilchigmish khatun – daughter of Toralchi of Oirats and Checheigen, went to his son Nairubuqa after his death
- Qutuqt khatun – a lady from Naimans
  - Khalukhan akhai – married Tatakhtai kurgen of Bayaut
  - Neguder akhai – engaged to Mongke Temür (Mengu-Timur)
- Ashitai khatun – daughter of Chigu of Khongirad and Tümelün bekhi (sister of Checheikhen)
  - Yobuqur
  - Melik temür
  - Qutuq
  - Tamachi
  - Kamtai
  - Nomgon - married Chapar kurgen of Oirats

=== Concubines ===
- Qutlu – a lady from Khongirad
- Irau-gui – a lady from Barulas clan
  - Nairubuqa

== Descendants of Ariq Böke ==
- Ariq Böke (阿里不哥/ālǐbúgē,اریغ بوکا/Arīq būkā)
  - Yobuqur (薬木忽兒/yàomùhūěr, یوبوقور/Yūbūqūr)
  - Melig-Temür (明里帖木兒/mínglǐ tiēmùér, ملک تیمور/Melik tīmūr)
    - Mingγan (منگقان/Mingqān)
      - Söse (سوسه/Sūsa)
        - Arba Ku'ün (ارپا كاون/Arpā Kāūn)
  - Nairaqu buqa (乃剌忽不花/nǎiláhū búhuā,نایرو بوقا/Nāīrū būqā)

Khagans of imprecise origin from Ariq Böke

- Jorightu Khan Yesüder (1388–1391) – first khan replaced Kublaid rule in Mongolia
- Engke Khan (1391–1394) – son of Yesüder
- Delbeg Khan (Dalbag) (1412–1415) – supported by Oirats
- Oyiradai (1415–1425) – supported by Oriats

== See also ==
- Toluid Civil War

== Notes ==
Ariq Böke House of Borjigin Born: c. 1219 Died: 1266
Regnal titles
Preceded by Möngke Khan	Great Khan of the Mongol Empire: (Nominal due to the empire's division); 11 August 1259 – 21 August 1264	Succeeded by Kublai Khan
