= Classical Mongolian =

Extinct Mongolic literary language

- Native to: Mongolia, China, Russia
- Era: 1600–1900; developed into modern Mongolian
- Language family: Mongolic: Classical Mongolian
- Early form: Middle Mongolian
- Writing system: Mongolian script ʼPhags-pa

Language codes
- ISO 639-3: cmg
- Glottolog: None

Classical Mongolian was the literary language of Mongolian that was first introduced shortly after 1600 when Ligdan Khan set his clergy the task of translating the whole of the Tibetan Buddhist canon, consisting of the Kangyur and Tengyur, into Mongolian. This script then became the established writing system used for all Mongolian literature until the 1930s when the Mongolian Latin alphabet was introduced, which then in 1941 was replaced by the Mongolian Cyrillic alphabet.

Classical Mongolian was formerly used in Mongolia, China, and Russia. It is a standardized written language used in the 18th century and 20th centuries.

Classical Mongolian sometimes refers to any language documents in Mongolian script that are neither Pre-classical (i.e. Middle Mongol in the Mongolian script) nor modern Mongolian.

== See also ==
- Middle Mongolian

== Sources ==
- Grønbech, Kaare; Krueger, John Richard (1993). An Introduction to Classical (literary) Mongolian: Introduction, Grammar, Reader, Glossary. Otto Harrassowitz Verlag. ISBN 978-3-447-03298-8.
- Janhunen, Juha (2003). "Written Mongol". In Janhunen, J. (ed.). The Mongolic languages. Routledge Language Family Series. Vol. 5. London: Routledge. pp. 30–56. ISBN 978-0-700-71133-8.
