= Bak Bulhwa =

Yuan dynasty eunuch

Park Bul-hwa or Piao Buhua (Chinese: 朴不花; Korean: 박불화; Hanja: 朴不花; Mongolian Script: ᠪᠤᠬ᠎ᠠ; ?－1364) was a Korean eunuch serving Empress Gi of the Yuan dynasty. He was the first ethnic Korean eunuch in Chinese history. Bak assisted Empress Gi's campaign to force Toghon Temür (Emperor Huizong of Yuan) to pass the imperial throne to her son, Ayushiridara (Emperor Zhaozong of Northern Yuan).

== Biography ==
Park Bul-hwa was born into the Haeju Park clan (해주 박씨, 海州 朴氏) during the reigns of King Chungsuk and King Chunghye of Goryeo.

During the reign of Emperor Wenzong of Yuan (1328-1332), Bak Bulhwa was sent to the court of the Yuan dynasty to become a junior eunuch at the age of seven. In 1333, one of Bul-hwa's close friend, Lady Ki of the Haengju Ki clan, was among the concubines sent to Yuan by the Goryeo kings, who had to provide a certain number of beautiful teenage girls to serve as concubines of the Yuan emperors once every three years. She eventually became the favored concubine of the prince Toghon Temür, and was admitted to his mansion.

When Lady Ki became empress consort, Bulhwa was transferred to Xingsheng Palace to take care of her son Biligtü Khan. Taking advantage of the fact that he and Empress Ki were close friends, Bulhwa went through various posts and eventually ascended to Tongzhi Shumi-yuanshi (同知 樞密院事) with the authority to lead the Yuan army, and after that, Ronglu-dafu Zhizheng-yuanshi (荣禄大夫 資正院使). He was given the Mongolian name Buka (Mongolian: ᠪᠤᠬ᠎ᠠ).

Later, he was appointed as the envoy of the imperial court. Bulhwa also assumed an important post in charge of finances. He used his power to interfere with the appointment and removal of officials.

With the support of Empress Ki, Bak Bulhwa conspired to abdicate Ayurshiridara, the son and crown prince of Empress Ki, but failed.

In 1351, King Gongmin, who ascended the throne of Goryeo and implemented the anti-circle policy, eliminating supporters of the Yuan dynasty such as Ki Ch'ŏl, who tyrannized the palace with Empress Ki's authority. In response, Bulhwa conspired with Empress Ki and Choi Yu to dethrone King Gongmin, and attempted to appoint Prince Deokheung, the illegitimate son of King Chungseon, instead. In 1364, Choi Yu and Prince Deokheung led an invasion in Goryeo with 10,000 Yuan soldiers, but the Goryeo army defeated this army and the attempt to depose was thwarted.

After this plan was thwarted, Bulhwa became involved in a fight between the Crown Prince Ayurshiridara faction and the anti-crowned faction, and along with Saksagam faction. Bulhwa was then killed by the chieftain Bolud Temur (孛羅帖木兒), the father of Empress Bayan Khutugh, in 1364.

Four years later in 1368, the Yuan dynasty was overthrown by the Ming dynasty.

== In popular culture ==
- Portrayed by Nam Young-jin in the 2005 - 2006 MBC TV series Shin Don.
- Portrayed by Choi Moo-sung in the 2013 - 2014 MBC TV series Empress Ki.
