= 1370 =

1370 in various calendars
- Gregorian calendar: 1370; MCCCLXX
- Ab urbe condita: 2123
- Armenian calendar: 819; ԹՎ ՊԺԹ
- Assyrian calendar: 6120
- Balinese saka calendar: 1291–1292
- Bengali calendar: 776–777
- Berber calendar: 2320
- English Regnal year: 43 Edw. 3 – 44 Edw. 3
- Buddhist calendar: 1914
- Burmese calendar: 732
- Byzantine calendar: 6878–6879
- Chinese calendar: 己酉年 (Earth Rooster); 4067 or 3860 — to — 庚戌年 (Metal Dog); 4068 or 3861
- Coptic calendar: 1086–1087
- Discordian calendar: 2536
- Ethiopian calendar: 1362–1363
- Hebrew calendar: 5130–5131
- Hindu calendars
- Vikram Samvat: 1426–1427
- Shaka Samvat: 1291–1292
- Kali Yuga: 4470–4471
- Holocene calendar: 11370
- Igbo calendar: 370–371
- Iranian calendar: 748–749
- Islamic calendar: 771–772
- Japanese calendar: Ōan 3 (応安３年)
- Javanese calendar: 1283–1284
- Julian calendar: 1370; MCCCLXX
- Korean calendar: 3703
- Minguo calendar: 542 before ROC 民前542年
- Nanakshahi calendar: −98
- Thai solar calendar: 1912–1913
- Tibetan calendar: ས་མོ་བྱ་ལོ་ (female Earth-Bird); 1496 or 1115 or 343 — to — ལྕགས་ཕོ་ཁྱི་ལོ་ (male Iron-Dog); 1497 or 1116 or 344

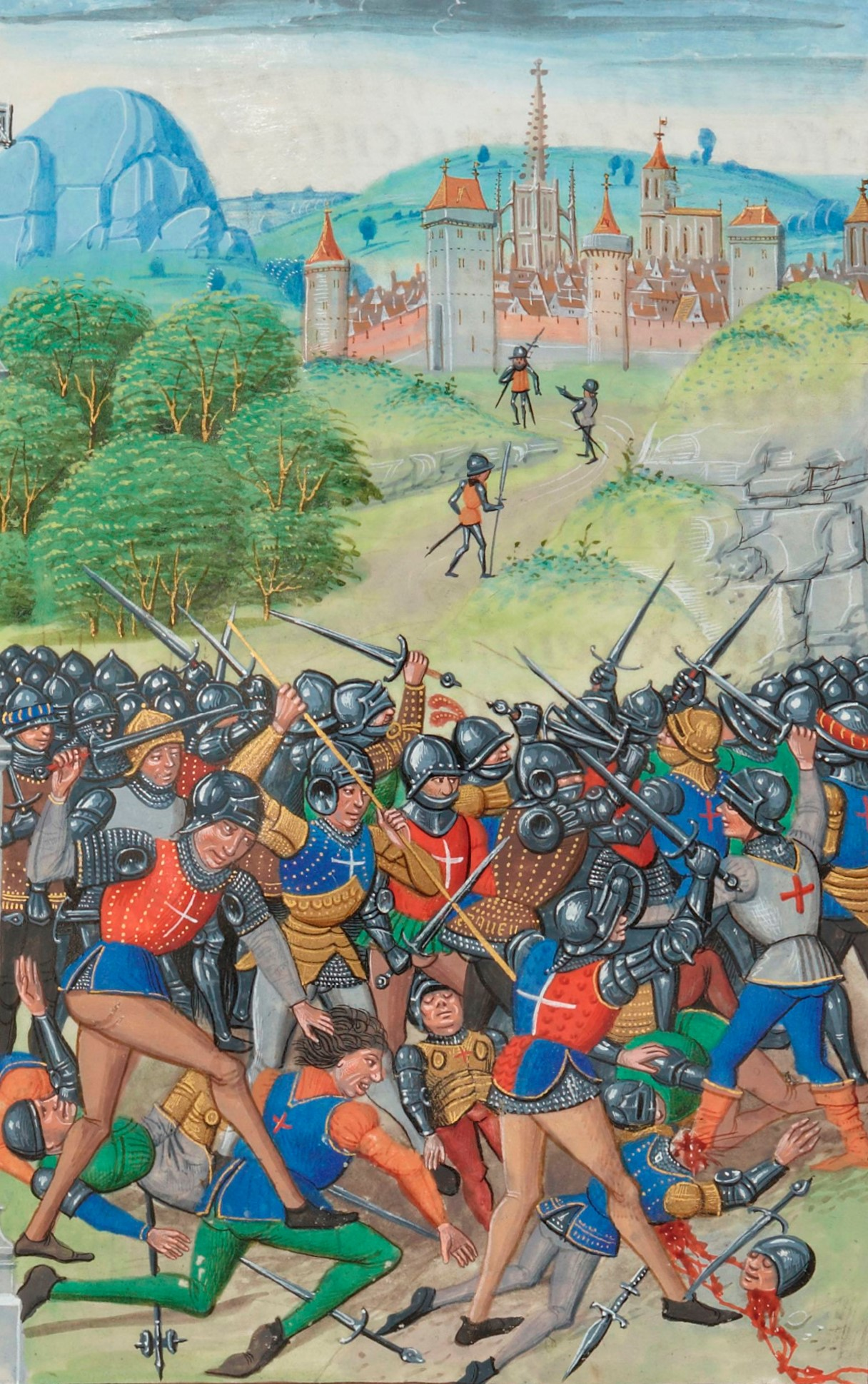
December 4: French Army defeats English in the Battle of Pontvallain.

Year 1370 (MCCCLXX) was a common year starting on Tuesday of the Julian calendar.

== Events ==
=== January–March ===
- January 2 – In France, the war over the autonomous state of Provence, launched by King Charles V's brother, the Duke of Anjou, against the ruling countess, Queen Joanna I of Naples, is halted by a truce forced by the invention of Pope Urban V and King Charles.
- January 6 – 11 (Tubah 1086 AM) Pope Gabriel IV is consecrated as the new leader of the Coptic Orthodox Church for the Coptic Christians of Egypt, and assumes the title of Bishop of Alexandria, succeeding the late Pope Yoannis X, who had died eight months earlier.
- January 9 – The funeral of the late Queen Philippa, who had served as Queen consort of England for 61 years as the wife of King Edward III, is held at Westminster Abbey.
- February 18 – The Battle of Rudau is fought between the Teutonic Knights and the Grand Duchy of Lithuania near Rudau village, north of Königsberg (now Melnikovo village in the Kaliningrad oblast). According to the Teutonic chronicler Wigand of Marburg and the Livonian chronicle of Hermann de Wartberge, the Lithuanians suffer a great defeat.
- March 20 – King David II of Scotland divorces his wife and queen consort of six years, Margaret Drummond. Queen Margaret then travels to Avignon and persuades Pope Urban V to rescind the divorce before King David dies the next year.
- March 27 – Antonio Ballester of Catalonia is appointed as the Latin Archbishop of Athens by Pope Urban VI.

=== April–June ===
- April 9 – Timur becomes first Amir of the Timurid Empire, following the Siege of Balkh which establishes his rule over the Chagatai Khanate, completing his conquest of Central Asia and parts of Persia.
- May 23 – Emperor Huizong, who was the last Chinese ruler of the Yuan dynasty (from 1333 to 1368) and ruler of a portion of Inner Mongolia after his defeat in 1368, dies at the age of 49.
- May 24 – The Treaty of Stralsund ends the second war between Denmark and the Hanseatic League, an alliance of market towns across northern Europe along the North Sea and the Baltic Sea.
- June 6 – At Yingchang, now part of the Hexigten province of China's Inner Mongolia autonomous region, Biligtü Khan Ayushiridara is crowned as Emperor of the Northern Yuan, the remaining portion of the Chinese territory that had been ruled by the Yuan dynasty prior its overthrow in 1368 by the rulers of the Ming dynasty. Prince Ayushiridara is the son of the late Emperor Huizong of Yuan.

=== July–September ===
- July 16 – An agreement is signed between Spain's King Pedro IV of Aragon and King Charles V of France for the marriage of Juan, Duke of Girona, heir to King Pedro, and Princess Jeanne de Valois, the aunt of King Charles. However, before the marriage can take place, Jeanne dies in 1371 while traveling to meet Prince Juan.
- August 16 – (24th day of 7th month, Shōhei 25) The Japanese era Kentoku begins to reflect the reign of the southern Emperor Chōkei
- September 9 – King Casimir III of Poland sustains a complicated fracture of his left leg when he is thrown from a horse while deer hunting outside the village of Zeleznica.' When he ignores medical advice, his injury becomes infected and he dies of sepsis less than two months later.
- September 19 – The Siege of Limoges takes place in the course of the Hundred Years' War as the English Army, led by Edward the Black Prince, retakes the of Limoges from the French by storm with wide destruction, effectively ending the Limoges enamel industry.

=== October–December ===
- October 20 – Philip of Anjou, Titular Emperor of Constantinople, marries his second wife Elizabeth of Slavonia (daughter of Stephen of Anjou and Margaret of Bavaria).
- November 5 – Casimir III the Great, king of Poland, dies two months after being injured in an accident while hunting, and is succeeded jointly by his sister, Elizabeth of Kujavia, and her son, Louis I of Hungary, beginning the rule of the country by the Capet-Anjou family.
- November 15 – Trần Nghệ Tông deposes Dương Nhật Lễ as emperor of Đại Việt, modern-day Vietnam.
- November 26 – Lithuanian–Muscovite War: In retaliation for the attack by the Grand Principality of Moscow on Tver and Bryansk, the Grand Duchy of Lithuania and the Principality of Tver begin a two-day siege of the Muscovite city of Volokolamsk. While the leader of Volokolamsk's defenses, Prince Vasily Ivanovich Berezuysky, is killed, the attackers end the siege without capturing the city, and then march toward Moscow.
- December 4 – In the Battle of Pontvallain, fought in the Hundred Years' War, a French army under Bertrand du Guesclin heavily defeats an English force in surprise attacks in northwest France.
- December 6 – Algirdas, Grand Duke of Lithuania, leads a siege of Moscow itself, the capital of the Grand Principality, and his forces burn and pillage the city as Moscow's Grand Prince Dmitry Donskoy retreats to the safety of the Kremlin. Donskoy's allies, his cousin Vladimir the Bold of Serpukhov and Prince Vladimir Dmitrievich Yaroslavich of Pronsk, come to Moscow's aid.
- December 14 – Moscow and Lithuania reach a truce to end the Lithuanian siege and Grand Duke Algirdas and his Lithuanian forces withdraw.
- December 20 – The 200th Roman Catholic pontiff, Pope Urban V, dies in Avignon after eight years, the first five of which were in Rome.
- December 30 – Cardinal Pierre de Beaufort, nephew of the late Pope Clement VI, is unanimously elected as the new Pope by 18 of the 20 Roman Catholic cardinals at Avignon. Beaufort takes the name Pope Gregory XI and is crowned six days later.

=== Date unknown ===
- Khun Luang Pa-Ngua, ruler of Suphanburi, marches and usurps the throne of the Ayutthaya Kingdom.
- The city of Xi'an in Ming dynasty China is given a new defensive city wall.
- Hugues Aubriot begins construction of the fortress of the Bastille in Paris.
- The steel crossbow is first used as a weapon of war.

== Births ==
- April 11 – Frederick I, Elector of Saxony (d. 1428)
- July 23 – Pier Paolo Vergerio the Elder, Italian humanist (d. 1444 or 1445)
- date unknown
  - Erasmo of Narni, Italian mercenary (d. 1443)
  - Guarino da Verona, Italian humanist (d. 1460)
  - John VII Palaiologos, Byzantine Emperor (d. 1408)
  - King Olav IV of Norway (d. 1387)
  - Jan Piast, Duke of Ziebice (d. 1428)
  - Jan Sindel, Polish scientist (d. 1443)
- probable
  - Joan of Navarre, Queen of England, Duchess regent of Brittany (d. 1437)
  - John Lydgate, English Benedictine monk and poet (d. 1451)
  - Paulus Vladimiri, Polish scholar (d. 1435)
  - Duke William of Austria (d. 1406)
  - Leonardo Bruni, Italian humanist, historian and statesman (d. 1444)

== Deaths ==
- May 31 – St. Vitalis of Assisi, Italian hermit (b. 1295)
- c. September 20 – Edward of Angoulême, French-born royal prince of England (b. 1365)
- November 5 – Casimir III the Great, King of Poland (b. 1310)
- December 19 – Pope Urban V (b. 1310)
- date unknown
  - Simeon Uroš, Emperor of Serbs and Greeks and half-brother of Stefan Dušan (b. 1326)
  - Vedanta Desika, Indian Hindu guru and poet (b. 1269)
  - Yang Weizhen, Chinese painter (b. c. 1296)
  - Toghon Temür, Emperor Huizong of Yuan dynasty China (b. 1320)
- probable date – Empress Gi of Yuan dynasty China (b. 1315)
