= Ki (Korean surname) =

- Hangul: 기
- Hanja: 奇, 寄, 箕, 紀
- RR: Gi
- MR: Ki

Ki (Korean: 기) also romanized as Gi or Kee, is a Korean family name. According to the 2015 census, there were 29,062 people with this surname in South Korea. It is written with four different hanja.

== Notable people ==
=== Notable people of the past ===
- Ki Cha-o (1266–1328), Goryeo military official and nobleman
- Ki Ch'ŏl (before 1315–1356), Goryeo politician and nobleman
- Empress Gi (1315–1369), Goryeo-born empress consort of the Yuan dynasty
- Gi Dae-seung (1527–1572), Confucian scholar
- Gi Ja-heon (1562–1624), Joseon politician

=== Notable people of recent times ===
- Ki Bo-bae (born 1988), South Korean archer, Olympic gold medalist
- Ki Do-hoon (born 1995), South Korean actor and model
- Ki Dong-min (born 1966), South Korean politician
- Ki Hui-hyeon (born 1995), South Korean singer and actress, member of girl group DIA
- Gi Hyeong-do (1960–1989), South Korean poet
- Ki Hyun-woo (born 2000), South Korean actor
- Ki Jun-young (born 1972), South Korean writer
- Lily Ki (better known as LilyPichu, born 1991), American internet personality, musician, voice actress, member of OfflineTV
- Ki Sok-pok (1913–1979), North Korean politician
- Ki Sung-yueng (born 1989), South Korean professional footballer
- Ki Tae-young (born 1978), South Korean actor

== See also ==
- List of Korean family names
