= Bayan Khutugh =

Bayan Khutugh Баянхутаг

Empress consort of the Yuan dynasty
- Tenure: 1337–1365
- Predecessor: Danashri
- Successor: Empress Gi
- Born: 1324
- Died: 1365 (aged 40–41)
- Spouse: Toghon Temür
- Issue: Prince Zhenjin; Prince Xueshan
- House: Onggirat (Hongjila clan)
- Father: Bolad Temür

Bayan Khutugh (1324–1365), also Bayan Qudu (Mongolian: ᠪᠠᠶᠠᠨᠬᠤᠲᠤᠭ Баянхутаг, Chinese: 伯顏忽都; Pai-yen Hu-tu), was an empress consort of the Yuan dynasty as the second wife of Toghon Temür (Emperor Huizong). Her father was Bolod Temür.

According to the History of Yuan, Bayan Qudu was known for being "frugal, unjealous, and thoroughly observant of ritual and regulation," which was a sharp contrast to the character and nature of the emperor's favourite concubine, Lady Ki (later known as Öljei Quduq).

== Marriage ==
In July 1335, Toghon Temür's first empress, Danashiri, daughter of the prime minister El Temür, was deposed and later sentenced to death by hanging in Dadu for her involvement in the failed rebellion led by her brother, Tanggici (T’ang Chi’i-shih).

It was not until 1337 that Toghon Temür remarried, this time to a girl of the influential Khongirad tribe, Bayan Qudu. Her enthronement as empress took place on 18 April 1337, when she was just thirteen years of age.

== Empress ==
According to traditional sources, Bayan Qudu was known for being plain and of simple habits, preferring to lead a retiring life, presumably due to the fact that Toghon Temür showed her very little attention.

However, on a journey to Shangdu, just 320 kilometres (200 miles) north of Dadu (Beijing), Toghon Temür desired to pay his empress a visit. He sent a eunuch as an emissary to express this wish. The austere empress replied, “The evening is not a time for Your Excellency to be going back and forth.” The eunuch returned to his master and reported the empress's words. Toghon Temür sent him back two more times, only to be turned away again each time. This led the emperor to think more highly of Bayan Qudu's virtue.

At some point, the empress gave birth to a son. This caused much controversy due to the fact that Toghon Temür's favourite concubine, Lady Gi, had already given birth to a desired heir, Ayushiridara. The empress's child, however, died at less than two years of age, thus securing Lady Gi's future and the succession of her own son.

== Death ==
On 8 September 1365, Bayan Qudu died, aged only forty-two. Lady Gi is reported to have looked over the late empress's tattered, plain clothing. Laughing, she remarked, “How can an empress and principal wife wear such attire?”

== In popular culture ==
- Portrayed by Lim Ju-eun in the 2013 MBC TV series Empress Ki. In the series, she is portrayed as ruthless and manipulative. She is also portrayed as having been the niece of Bayan of the Merkid, and as sister to Bayan's nephew, Toghto.

== Notes ==
Preceded by Empress Danashri	Consort of Toghon Temür; 1337–1365	Succeeded by Empress Gi
Preceded by Empress Danashri	Empress of the Yuan dynasty 1337–1365	Succeeded by Empress Gi
