= Bolad Temür =

Yuan dynasty warlord

Bolad Temür (simplified Chinese: 孛罗帖木儿; traditional Chinese: 孛羅帖木兒; pinyin: Bèiluōtiēmù'er; ? – 1365) was a warlord of the Yuan dynasty of China. His daughter, Bayan Khutugh, was the second wife of emperor Toghon Temür.

== Life ==
Bolad Temür was the son of Dash Badalugh, the Yuan military organizer in Henan. After 1359, the Yuan government, feeling threatened by Chaghan Temur's consolidation of power in northern China, gave Bolad control of Hebei and northern Shanxi before ordering Chaghan to transfer control of central Shanxi to him. Chaghan's successful refusal revealed the strong regional interests of the nominal Yuan loyalists of northern China. Chaghan was murdered while besieging Yidu in July 1362—possibly by men sent by Bolad—and was succeeded by his son, Köke Temür. Bolad joined Li Siqi and other northern warlords to oppose Köke (even while rebel leader Zhu Yuanzhang was expanding his power in southern China).

While Köke was consolidating his power in northern China, Bolad Temür plotted to remove the heir apparent, Ayushiridara, from the line of succession; Ayushiridara was the son of emperor Toghon Temur's favourite concubine, Öljei Khutuk, rather than Bolad's daughter, Empress Bayan Khutugh. Meanwhile, Bolad's insults directed towards Köke led to warfare between the two. In May 1364, Köke's imminent victory drove Bolad to flee to the capital, Khanbaliq, possibly to use the imperial family as political hostages. His arrival frightened Ayushiridara, who fled to Köke's protection. The emperor, sick of Bolad's control over the Yuan court, ordered his assassination by an axe to the skull, which took place on 16 August 1365; Bolad’s adviser had been sent to Ayushiridara to convince him to return to the capital. Li Siqi, along with three of Bolad's followers (Zhang Liangbi, Törebeg, and Kong Xing), would continue to wage war against Köke Temur, preventing any possibility of Yuan restoration in southern China.
