= Maidilibala =

14th-century Yuan dynasty prince and Ming Dynasty marquis

Maidilibala 買的里八剌
- Prince of Yuan

Marquis of Chongli
- Born: 1362
- Died: After 1374
- House: Borjigin
- Dynasty: Yuan and Northern Yuan
- Father: Biligtü Khan Ayushiridara
- Mother: Empress Consort Kwon

Maidilibala (Chinese: 買的里八剌; Sanskrit: मैत्रेय पाल्) was a prince of the Yuan dynasty who was made the Marquis of Chongli by the Ming dynasty. He was taken prisoner by the Ming army but was later released and returned to Northern Yuan. He is thought to be the same person as Elbeg Nigülesügchi Khan, and thus to have become Khan after his return to the Northern Yuan.

His name derives from Sanskrit and is a person's name derived from Tibetan Buddhism.

== Biography ==
He was born in year 22 of the Zhizheng era (1362). In 1368, he evacuated from Dadu (now Beijing) with his father and grandfather. In 1369, the Ming Dynasty conquered Shangdu and retreated to Yingchang (now the west bank of Dalinur Lake, Hexigten Banner, Inner Mongolia). In 1370, after his grandfather died, he was captured by the Ming army in Yingchang on the fifth lunar month and sent to the capital (then Nanjing). He was held prisoners for five years, in which the Ming named him Marquis (Chinese: 侯; pinyin: Hóu) of Chongli. In the ninth month of the lunar calendar (1374), Emperor Taizu of the Ming Dynasty sent him back to Northern Yuan. There is no record of his subsequent life.

There is a saying that Tögüs Temür, who succeeded Emperor Zhaozong of Northern Yuan, was the same person as Maidilibala. In a book sent to Orjei Temuru Khan, Emperor Yongle stated: "Emperor Hongwu protected Tögüs Temür and sent him back to Mongolia, and later Tögüs Temür became Khan [...]". It seems that the idea of Maidilibala-Tögüs Temür was once widespread, at least during the time of the Yongle Emperor. However, their ages differ, and Mongolian historical sources say that Tögüs Temür was in fact the younger brother of Emperor Zhaozong. Sei Wada argued that Maidilibala and Tögüs Temür were different people. Mongolian historian Buyandelger believes that Maidilibala was in fact the later Mongolian Khan Elbeg.

In 1388, the eldest son of Tögüs Temür, Tian Baonu, was killed together with his father, and the second son, Di Baonu, was exiled to the Ryukyu by the Ming. Thus, the descendants of Tögüs Temür in Mongolia were eliminated. According to the "Huang Shi", Elbeg Nigülesügchi Khan ascended the throne at the age of thirty-three and reigned for four years; the anonymous "Golden History Outline" says that he ascended the throne in the Year of the Dog (1394).

Judging from the year of birth, name and relevant records of the Ming people, Elbeg Nigülesügchi Khan should be the same person as Maidilibala. Elbeg Nigülesügchi and Maidilibala were both born in 1362. Second, the two names have the same meaning.

== Sources ==
- Buyandelger: "The Lineage and Political Situation of the Northern Yuan Khans Before the Middle of the 15th Century" (Chinese:《15世纪中叶前的北元可汗世系及政局》), Research on Mongolian History, Volume 6
