= Ki Ch'ŏl =

Goryeo nobleman (fl. 14th century)

- Hangul: 기철
- Hanja: 奇轍
- RR: Gi Cheol
- MR: Ki Ch'ŏl

Royal title
- Hangul: 덕성부원군
- Hanja: 德城府院君
- RR: Deokseong buwongun
- MR: Tŏksŏng puwŏn'gun

Ki Ch'ŏl (Korean: 기철; Hanja: 奇轍; died June 16, 1356 (Note: In the Korean calendar (lunisolar), he died on the 18th day of the 5th Lunar month.)), also known by his Mongolian name Bayan Buka, was a political figure and nobleman in the late Goryeo dynasty. After his younger sister, Empress Gi who was the wife of Toghon Temür giving birth to a prince, Ki Ch'ŏl was then honoured as Internal Prince Deokseong.

Ki received a government post from the Yuan dynasty and appointed as the Grand Minister of Education or da situ (大司徒) in 1340. In 1353, Ki was appointed as a manager of the Liaoyang Branch Secretariat. Since the Haengju Ki clan was regarded as a powerful family in Goryeo, he was given preferential treatment with or equal to that of the Goryeo ruler during his stay in Yuan. On June 16, 1356, Ki was invited to a palace banquet by King Gongmin himself, but as soon as he entered it, the king accused him and Kwŏn Kyŏm, both members of the pro-Yuan faction, of plotting treason and conspiracy, and they were arrested and executed them on the spot. Ki Yu-gŏl and Öljei Buka were also killed by the king's orders. This event is present-day known as "Byeongsin coup" in Korean history.

== Family ==
- Father: Ki Cha-o
- Mother: Grand Lady Yeongan of the Yi clan (영안왕대부인 이씨), also known as Wangzai Han Khatun.
  - Older brother: Ki Sik (기식)
  - Younger brother: Ki Wŏn, Prince Deokyang (기원 덕양군)
    - Nephew: Öljei Bukha
  - Younger brother: Ki Chu (기주)
  - Younger brother: Ki Yun (기윤)
  - Younger sister: Empress Gi – married Emperor Huizong of Yuan.
    - Nephew: Emperor Zhaozong of Yuan
- Children(s):
  - 1st son: Ki Yu-gŏl (기유걸; d. 1356)
  - 2nd son: Ki In-gŏl (기인걸)
  - 3rd son: Ki Se-gŏl (기세걸)
  - 4th son: Ki Sayin-Temür (기새인첩목아)
  - 5th son: Ki Sayin-Buqa (기새인불화; d. 1356)
  - A daughter who married Wang Chung-gwi (왕중귀)

== In popular culture ==
- Portrayed by Kim Yoon-hyung in the 1983 KBS TV series Foundation of the Kingdom.
- Portrayed by Lee Dae-yeon in the 2005–2006 MBC TV Series Shin Don.
- Portrayed by Yu Oh-seong in the 2012 SBS TV series Faith.
