= Hama (Yuan dynasty) =

Hama (Chinese: 哈麻), courtesy name Shilian (士廉), was an ethnic Kangly official and Tibetan monk of China's Yuan dynasty. He served as chief minister to the Emperor Shun.

After Toqto'a's disgrace, Hama was created chancellor, while his younger brother Xuexue (雪雪) was made the chief censor of the Yuan dynasty. Hama was made first minister and all power was then in his hands. Elated by this success, Hama decided to place Ayushiridara on the throne. The plot was discovered, and Hama was sentenced to exile and strangled by his enemies there in 1356, while Ayushiridara was pardoned.
