= Empress Ki (TV series) =

2013–2014 South Korean TV series

- Promotional poster for Empress Ki
- Genre: Historical: Romance
- Based on: Empress Gi
- Written by: Jang Young-chul; Jung Kyung-soon
- Directed by: Han Hee; Lee Sung-joon
- Starring: Ha Ji-won; Joo Jin-mo; Ji Chang-wook; Baek Jin-hee
- Composer: Kim Jang-woo
- Country of origin: South Korea
- Original language: Korean
- No. of episodes: 51

Production
- Executive producer: Joo Sung-woo
- Producer: Cho Yoon-jung
- Running time: 60 minutes
- Production company: Victory Contents

Original release
- Network: MBC TV
- Release: October 28, 2013 – April 29, 2014

Empress Ki (Korean: 기황후; Hanja: 奇皇后; RR: Gi Hwanghu) is a 2013–2014 South Korean historical drama television series starring Ha Ji-won as the titular Empress Ki. The 51-episode series aired on MBC TV from October 28, 2013, to April 29, 2014, on Mondays and Tuesdays at 21:55 (KST).

A domestic and overseas hit, the series received the Golden Bird Prize for Serial Drama at the 9th Seoul International Drama Awards. Ha Ji-won also won the Grand Prize at the MBC Drama Awards for her performance.

== Title ==
The early working title was Hwatu (Korean: 화투; lit. 'Battle of Flowers') but the title was changed to prevent confusion with the similarly named playing cards.

== Synopsis ==
The series revolves around Ki Seung-nyang (Ha Ji-won), a Goryeo-born woman who ascends to power despite the restrictions of the era's class system, and later marries the emperor of the Yuan dynasty, Toghon Temür (Ji Chang-wook) to become a Yuan empress, instead of her first love, Wang Yoo (Joo Jin-mo). It managed to highlight the deep love the Emperor embedded in Lady Ki and depicts her loves and political ambitions.

== Cast ==
=== Main ===
- Ha Ji-won as Ki Seung-nyang / Ki Nyang, the future Empress Ki
  - Jung Ji-so as young Ki Seung-nyang

A woman who was born in Goryeo but is sent to Yuan as a child with a group of tribute women. Her mother gets killed when the group tries to escape, but she manages to flee, growing up as a boy then man and becoming a great warrior. She is a great patriot of Goryeo and serves the country with her life, disguised as a man. Initially the fiancée of Wang Yoo, she is later forcibly taken to the Yuan court. She eventually becomes the wife of Ta Hwan, thus making her the Empress Consort of the Yuan dynasty, as which she greatly influences politics.

- Joo Jin-mo as Wang Yoo, King Choonghye of Goryeo
  - Ahn Do-gyu as young Wang Yoo

The King of Goryeo who is Ki Seung-nyang's first love and fiancé. He later dies in the Yuan dynasty.

- Ji Chang-wook as Toghon Temür / Ta Hwan

The last Emperor of the Yuan dynasty and Seung-nyang's true love and later husband.

- Baek Jin-hee as Tanashiri, daughter of Yeon Chul

A noblewoman who was the first wife and Empress Consort of Ta Hwan but when her crimes are revealed, is deposed from her throne and is executed in front of her people. Tanashiri serves as the main antagonist of the first chapter who plotted to kill Seung-nyang's friends and poison anyone who dare to take her throne.

=== Supporting ===
==== People in Yuan Dynasty ====
===== Imperial household =====
- Kim Seo-hyung as the Empress Dowager; Ta Hwan's aunt. However, due to her greed, she attempted to kill Ta Hwan but failed and committed suicide as she is unwilling to accept defeat.
- Lim Ju-eun as Bayan Khutugh, niece of Baek Ahn

The evil second wife and Empress Consort of Ta Hwan after Tanashiri's death. She was also deposed from her position due to her cunningness.

- Jeon Se-hyun as Lady Oh; Ta Hwan's Mongolian concubine. She is the daughter of Governor Ohgwang of Yunnan.
- Park Ha-na as Lady Bu; Ta Hwan's Mongolian concubine. She is daughter of Governor Busaqui of Lingbei.

===== Nobleman and ministers =====
- Jeon Gook-hwan as Yeon Chul; Empress Tanashiri's merciless father and Yuan Dynasty's regent.
- Kim Jung-hyun as Dang Ki-se; Yeon Chul's ruthless eldest son and Empress Tanashiri's oldest brother.
- Cha Do-jin as Tap Ja-hae; Yeon Chul's greedy second son and Empress Tanashiri's second older brother.
- Kim Young-ho as Baek Ahn

Empress Bayan Khutugh's uncle who succeeded Yeon Chul's position as Yuan Dynasty's regent. He was later killed by Tal Tal for being greedy and evil like Yeon Chul.

- Jin Yi-han as Tal Tal

Empress Bayan Khutugh's cousin and Baek Ahn's nephew. Following his uncle's death, Tal Tal become the new Yuan Dynasty's regent.

- Cha Kwang-soo as Go Yong-bo
- Lee Gye-young as Busaqui
- Jang Soon-gook as Seol Do-kan
- Park Tong-il as Haeng Sung-joo

===== Servants and maids =====
- Lee Won-jong as Dok-man; Goryeo-born who become the Yuan eunuch in Aekjung Palace.
- Shin Seung-hwan as Kkwe-bo
- Choi Moo-sung as Park Bul-hwa; Goryeo-born who become the Yuan eunuch.
- Jung Yoon as Kook-soo
- Lee Eung-kyung as Court Lady Noh
- Seo Yi-sook as Court Lady Seo; Empress Tanashiri's right-hand servant. The one who reveals Prince Maha's birth mother.
- Yoon A-jung as Yeon-hwa / Court Lady Yeon – The evil servant who tortures Seung-nyang. After conniving with Tanashiri and Lady Seo to steal the baby from the maid by poisoning them, she was granted a Court Lady position.
- Lee Ji-hyun as Hong-dan
- Kim Myung-gook as Jang Soon-yong

==== People in Goryeo Dynasty ====
===== Royal household =====
- Kwon Tae-won as Wang Man, King Choongsook
- Ryu Hyun-kyung as Princess Kyunghwa; Yuan-born who become King Choongsook's wife.
- Lee Jae-yong as Wang Go, Prince Yeonan, King Simyang; a Royal Family member and the head of Chirwon Faction.
- Choi Jung-won as Wang Gi, Grand Prince Gangneung, later King Gongmin

===== People around Wang Yoo =====
- Lee Moon-sik as Bang Shin-woo; Goryeo's eunuch.
- Kwon Oh-joong as Choi Moo-song; a man who died in Yuan Dynasty together with Wang Yoo.
- Yoon Yong-hyun as Jeom Park-yi; Goryeo Kings' assistant and servant.
- Yoo In-young as Yeon Bi-soo / Batoru; a woman warrior who leading the Göktürks (?), who were controlling Yuan's western frontier and the silk road. She admired Wang Yoo but later died protecting him.
- Seo In-woo as Soo-ri; Batoru's aide.
- Song Kyung-chul as Mak-saeng / Jeok-ho; a village chief in Goryeo Dynasty who become the Yuan Emperor's eunuch.

=== Others ===
- Kim Myeong-su as Ki Ja-oh, King Yeongahn, Ki Seung-nyang's father and a royal commander.
- Kim Jin-seong as Prince Maha; Wang Yoo and Seung-nyang's son who is adopted by Tanashiri.
  - Seol Wo-hyung as young Prince Maha
- Jung Woong-in as Yeom Byung-soo
- Kim Hyung-bum as Jo-cham
- Jo Jae-yoon as Golta; the main antagonist in the series and a Yuan's eunuch.
- Kim Jin-woo as Ayushiridara (Biligtü Khan); Ta Hwan and Seung-nyang's son.
  - Lee Shi-woo as young Ayushiridara
- Jo Woo-jin as Wang Go's soldier.

=== Special appearances ===
- Kim Ye-ryung as Lady Lee; Seung-nyang's mother.
- Lee Jung-sung as Kim Soon-jo
- Oh Kwang-rok as Heuk-soo
- Kim Moo-young as Na-moo
- Han Hye-rin as Park Oh-jin; Ta Hwan's Korean concubine. She was a court lady in the Yuan Palace before she became a concubine. Her life as a concubine became tragic.
- Shim Yi-young as a fortune teller (Ep. 28)
- Park Hae-mi as a shaman (Ep. 34–35)
- Seo Bum-shik as Won-jin
- Jung Byung-ho as Joo Gook-chung
- Jung Soo-in as a Courtesan
- Seo Ji-yeon as an Inspector Court Lady
- Son Kwang-up as the killer Mak-son
- Yoon Young-mok as a coward captain
- Jung Jae-min as Yirinjilban
- Choi-hyun as Ballachupmokah
- Kim Hyo-won as Emperor Myungjong of Yuan; the former emperor of Yuan.

== Original soundtrack ==
Empress Ki OST

Soundtrack album by Various Artists
- Released: 2013
- Genres: Kpop; Soundtrack
- Language: Korean
- Labels: Stone Music Entertainment; Hwa&Dam Pictures; Glove Entertainment

=== Part 1 ===
No.	Title	Artist	Length
1.	"Thorn Love" (가시사랑)	4men	3:34
2.	"Thorn Love" (Inst.)		3:34
Total length:			7:58

=== Part 2 ===
No.	Title	Artist	Length
1.	"Love Wind" (사랑 바람)	WAX	3:05
2.	"Love Wind"		3:05
Total length:			6:10

=== Part 3 ===
No.	Title	Artist	Length
1.	"Love You" (사랑 합니다)	Junsu	3:41
2.	"Love You" (Inst.)		3:41
Total length:			8:52

=== Part 4 ===
No.	Title	Artist	Length
1.	"Just Once" (한번만)	Soyou	4:11
2.	"Just Once" (Inst.)		4:11
Total length:			8:22

=== Part 5 ===
No.	Title	Artist	Length
1.	"The Wind" (ㅂ람결)	Park Wan-kyu	3:29
2.	"The Wind" (Inst.)		3:29
Total length:			6:58

=== Part 6 ===
No.	Title	Artist	Length
1.	"The Day"	ZIA	3:35
2.	"The Day" (Inst.)		3:35
Total length:			7:50

=== Part 7 ===
No.	Title	Artist	Length
1.	"To the Butterfly" (나비에게)	Ji Chang-wook	4:06
2.	"To the Butterfly" (Inst.)		4:06
Total length:			8:12

Disc 2:
No.	Title	Artist	Length
1.	"Empress Ki (Opening Title)"	Kim Jang-woo	3:20
2.	"Empress ki (Main theme)"	Kim Jang-woo	5:14
3.	"Emperor"	Kim Jang-woo	2:20
4.	"Destiny"	Kim Jang-woo	5:29
5.	"Flower Blossom"	Kim Jang-woo	5:38
6.	"The Greatest Day"	Kim Jang-woo	2:38
7.	"Fate"	Kim Jang-woo	4:47
8.	"Princess"	Kim Jang-woo	2:58
9.	"Heroes"	Kim Jang-woo	2:09
10.	"Horse Riding"	Kim Jang-woo	1:31

== Reception ==
The series attained high ratings during its run, ranking first in its timeslot with a peak viewership rating of 33.9 percent. According to a report by Taiwan's drama channel ETTV, the series was ranked as the best foreign program for 2014 with 5.35% viewership rating, becoming the second Korean drama after Jewel in the Palace (2003) to do so. It also received positive reviews for its strong acting skills, gripping background and elaborate scenes.

Despite its popularity, the series was criticized for its inclusion of fictional elements regarding the characters and storyline. Much concern was raised over the series' depiction of the titular Empress Ki, who was portrayed as a brave warrior in the series. Historians were worried that the audience would overlook the fact that the real-life Empress Ki was responsible for attacking her native land.

== Ratings ==
In this table, the blue numbers represent the lowest ratings and the red numbers represent the highest ratings.

Ep.	Original broadcast date	Average audience share			
Ep.	Original broadcast date	Nielsen Korea		TNmS	
Ep.	Original broadcast date	Nationwide	Seoul	Nationwide	Seoul
1	October 28, 2013	11.1% (9th)	13.3% (4th)	10.1% (13th)	12.3% (8th)
2	October 29, 2013	13.6% (4th)	15.8% (4th)	12.0% (6th)	14.6% (4th)
3	November 4, 2013	12.8% (6th)	14.5% (5th)	11.7% (11th)	14.9% (4th)
4	November 5, 2013	14.5% (4th)	16.6% (3rd)	12.7% (6th)	15.4% (4th)
5	November 11, 2013	14.5% (5th)	16.1% (4th)	14.0% (5th)	17.3% (4th)
6	November 12, 2013	16.3% (4th)	18.7% (3rd)	14.6% (4th)	18.6% (4th)
7	November 18, 2013	15.5% (5th)	17.6% (3rd)	15.2% (4th)	18.4% (4th)
8	November 19, 2013	16.9% (4th)	18.6% (3rd)	16.5% (4th)	20.1% (3rd)
9	November 25, 2013	17.2% (4th)	19.5% (3rd)	15.4% (4th)	19.1% (4th)
10	November 26, 2013	18.1% (3rd)	19.6% (3rd)	16.2% (4th)	19.5% (3rd)
11	December 2, 2013	17.8% (5th)	20.5% (2nd)	17.7% (4th)	20.8% (3rd)
12	December 3, 2013	19.0% (4th)	21.0% (3rd)	18.4% (4th)	21.7% (3rd)
13	December 9, 2013	20.2% (3rd)	23.5% (2nd)	19.1% (4th)	23.6% (2nd)
14	December 10, 2013	19.5% (3rd)	21.9% (2nd)	18.4% (4th)	23.3% (1st)
15	December 16, 2013	18.8% (4th)	21.5% (3rd)	17.7% (4th)	21.7% (4th)
16	December 17, 2013	18.8% (3rd)	21.4% (3rd)	18.1% (4th)	21.9% (2nd)
17	December 23, 2013	17.3% (4th)	20.1% (2nd)	17.3% (4th)	20.5% (2nd)
18	December 24, 2013	17.5% (3rd)	19.9% (2nd)	17.3% (3rd)	20.5% (2nd)
19	January 6, 2014	17.9% (3rd)	20.4% (3rd)	17.0% (3rd)	21.8% (2nd)
20	January 7, 2014	19.1% (3rd)	21.3% (2nd)	18.5% (3rd)	23.8% (2nd)
21	January 13, 2014	19.6% (3rd)	22.9% (2nd)	18.2% (3rd)	23.7% (2nd)
22	January 14, 2014	20.3% (3rd)	22.1% (2nd)	19.0% (3rd)	23.9% (2nd)
23	January 20, 2014	20.8% (3rd)	23.6% (2nd)	19.5% (3rd)	23.6% (2nd)
24	January 21, 2014	22.6% (2nd)	26.2% (2nd)	20.7% (3rd)	24.7% (2nd)
25	January 27, 2014	22.8% (2nd)	26.8% (1st)	21.4% (3rd)	27.0% (2nd)
26	January 28, 2014	24.9% (2nd)	28.6% (1st)	22.0% (2nd)	26.3% (2nd)
27	February 3, 2014	23.9% (2nd)	27.7% (1st)	24.2% (2nd)	29.8% (1st)
28	February 4, 2014	25.3% (2nd)	29.1% (1st)	24.0% (2nd)	29.3% (1st)
29	February 10, 2014	22.7% (2nd)	25.3% (1st)	20.8% (2nd)	25.3% (1st)
30	February 17, 2014	26.5% (2nd)	29.9% (1st)	25.3% (2nd)	30.9% (1st)
31	February 18, 2014	26.6% (1st)	29.4% (1st)	25.6% (2nd)	30.9% (1st)
32	February 24, 2014	25.3% (2nd)	28.8% (1st)	24.4% (2nd)	31.0% (1st)
33	February 25, 2014	28.6% (1st)	31.3% (1st)	27.9% (2nd)	33.6% (1st)
34	March 3, 2014	26.2% (2nd)	29.7% (1st)	26.1% (2nd)	32.4% (1st)
35	March 4, 2014	28.3% (1st)	31.4% (1st)	26.5% (2nd)	32.3% (1st)
36	March 10, 2014	26.9% (2nd)	30.8% (1st)	26.0% (2nd)	31.4% (1st)
37	March 11, 2014	29.2% (1st)	32.4% (1st)	27.1% (2nd)	32.4% (1st)
38	March 17, 2014	27.7% (2nd)	31.3% (1st)	25.6% (2nd)	30.7% (1st)
39	March 18, 2014	26.5% (2nd)	29.7% (1st)	25.0% (2nd)	29.3% (1st)
40	March 24, 2014	24.4% (2nd)	27.9% (2nd)	22.4% (2nd)	27.5% (2nd)
41	March 25, 2014	26.0% (2nd)	28.8% (1st)	24.0% (2nd)	29.8% (1st)
42	March 31, 2014	25.0% (2nd)	28.8% (1st)	23.5% (2nd)	27.2% (2nd)
43	April 1, 2014	25.0% (2nd)	27.9% (1st)	24.1% (2nd)	27.4% (2nd)
44	April 7, 2014	24.3% (2nd)	27.2% (1st)	23.9% (3rd)	27.8% (2nd)
45	April 8, 2014	25.5% (2nd)	28.7% (1st)	23.5% (2nd)	28.7% (2nd)
46	April 14, 2014	25.3% (2nd)	28.3% (1st)	23.9% (2nd)	28.0% (2nd)
47	April 15, 2014	26.1% (2nd)	28.8% (1st)	23.8% (2nd)	28.9% (1st)
48	April 21, 2014	22.9% (2nd)	24.9% (1st)	22.7% (2nd)	25.6% (2nd)
49	April 22, 2014	26.6% (2nd)	29.4% (1st)	23.9% (2nd)	27.2% (2nd)
50	April 28, 2014	26.2% (2nd)	28.7% (1st)	25.7% (2nd)	30.6% (1st)
51	April 29, 2014	28.7% (2nd)	31.7% (1st)	28.3% (2nd)	33.9% (1st)
Average		21.9%	24.7%	20.7%	25.1%

== International broadcast ==
Philippines: Empress Ki aired on GMA Network from October 20, 2014 to April 14, 2015, on Mondays to Thursdays at 22:00 (PST) for 100 episodes. It was dubbed in Filipino.

Ratings in the Philippines
Episode # (in PH)	Broadcast date	Average audience share	
Episode # (in PH)	Broadcast date	AGB Nielsen	Kantar Media
Episode # (in PH)	Broadcast date	Mega Manila	Nationwide
1	October 20, 2014	12.6%	7.3%
2	October 21, 2014	12.8%	7.0%
3	October 22, 2014	12.7%	6.8%
4	October 23, 2014	12.9%	7.5%
5	October 27, 2014	12.5%	6.4%
6	October 28, 2014	11.1%	6.8%
7	October 29, 2014	12.8%	6.9%
8	October 30, 2014	12.8%	7.5%
9	November 3, 2014	13.3%	7.1%
10	November 4, 2014	12.2%	7.5%
11	November 5, 2014	13.9%	7.9%
12	November 6, 2014	12.7%	7.5%
13	November 10, 2014	13.2%	7.4%
14	November 11, 2014	13.0%	7.3%
15	November 12, 2014	14.6%	8.4%
16	November 13, 2014	14.9%	8.5%
17	November 17, 2014	13.8%	8.4%
18	November 18, 2014	14.6%	8.4%
19	November 19, 2014	14.3%	8.6%
20	November 20, 2014	14.4%	8.4%
21	November 24, 2014	14.5%	8.7%
22	November 25, 2014	13.9%	8.2%
23	November 26, 2014	16.0%	8.4%
24	November 27, 2014	14.5%	8.1%
25	December 1, 2014	14.8%	9.2%
26	December 2, 2014	15.1%	9.2%
27	December 3, 2014	14.1%	9.7%
28	December 4, 2014	15.2%	9.9%
29	December 8, 2014	15.8%	8.3%
30	December 9, 2014	14.7%	7.9%
31	December 10, 2014	16.2%	9.2%
32	December 11, 2014	15.4%	6.8%
33	December 15, 2014	14.0%	8.1%
34	December 16, 2014	15.0%	9.0%
35	December 17, 2014	15.1%	8.7%
36	December 18, 2014	15.9%	9.8%
37	December 22, 2014	15.6%	9.1%
38	December 23, 2014	16.2%	8.9%
39	December 24, 2014	15.1%	11.9%
40	December 25, 2014	15.2%	8.1%
41	December 29, 2014	16.4%	7.8%
42	December 30, 2014	16.3%	9.5%
43	January 1, 2015	16.4%	8.9%
44	January 5, 2015	16.6%	8.9%
45	January 6, 2015	18.2%	10.3%
46	January 7, 2015	17.5%	9.5%
47	January 8, 2015	16.3%	9.0%
48	January 12, 2015	17.2%	9.2%
49	January 13, 2015	17.7%	9.8%
50	January 14, 2015	19.1%	11.0%
51	January 15, 2015	17.9%	10.1%
52	January 19, 2015	19.3%	10.2%
53	January 20, 2015	19.0%	10.8%
54	January 21, 2015	19.0%	11.1%
55	January 22, 2015	21.1%	11.3%
56	January 26, 2015	19.9%	10.0%
57	January 27, 2015	19.6%	10.5%
58	January 28, 2015	20.3%	10.9%
59	January 29, 2015	21.1%	11.4%
60	February 2, 2015	19.2%	10.2%
61	February 3, 2015	19.3%	11.2%
62	February 4, 2015	19.2%	11.6%
63	February 5, 2015	20.6%	11.8%
64	February 9, 2015	20.5%	12.8%
65	February 10, 2015	19.8%	11.7%
66	February 11, 2015	21.3%	12.3%
67	February 12, 2015	20.8%	12.4%
68	February 16, 2015	21.3%	12.3%
69	February 17, 2015	20.4%	12.5%
70	February 18, 2015	22.1%	13.2%
71	February 19, 2015	21.6%	13.2%
72	February 23, 2015	21.3%	14.1%
73	February 24, 2015	20.6%	13.7%
74	February 25, 2015	19.8%	14.4%
75	February 26, 2015	19.1%	14.0%
76	March 2, 2015	19.8%	12.7%
77	March 3, 2015	19.8%	12.1%
78	March 4, 2015	19.7%	12.6%
79	March 5, 2015	20.7%	13.1%
80	March 9, 2015	18.9%	13.1%
81	March 10, 2015	19.5%	13.5%
82	March 11, 2015	19.6%	13.4%
83	March 12, 2015	19.3%	13.1%
84	March 16, 2015	18.2%	12.4%
85	March 17, 2015	19.0%	12.6%
86	March 18, 2015	20.2%	13.2%
87	March 19, 2015	20.5%	13.1%
88	March 23, 2015	20.5%	13.9%
89	March 24, 2015	21.5%	14.6%
90	March 25, 2015	21.5%	15.3%
91	March 26, 2015	21.0%	14.6%
92	March 30, 2015	21.4%	14.9%
93	March 31, 2015	22.1%	14.9%
94	April 1, 2015	22.8%	15.8%
95	April 6, 2015	21.6%	15.1%
96	April 7, 2015	22.0%	14.0%
97	April 8, 2015	21.6%	14.9%
98	April 9, 2015	22.3%	15.9%
99	April 13, 2015	23.9%	16.6%
100	April 14, 2015	25.2%	17.2%
Average		17.7%	10.7%

Vietnam: Empress Ki aired on VTV3 from May 8, 2014 to August 11, 2014, on Mondays to Fridays at 12:00 (ICT) for 68 episodes. It was dubbed in Vietnamese.

== Awards and nominations ==
Year	Award	Category	Recipient	Result
2013	MBC Drama Awards	Grand Prize (Daesang)	Ha Ji-won	Won
2013	MBC Drama Awards	Top Excellence Award, Actress in a Special Project Drama	Ha Ji-won	Nominated
2013	MBC Drama Awards	Excellence Award, Actor in a Special Project Drama	Joo Jin-mo	Won
2013	MBC Drama Awards	Excellence Award, Actor in a Special Project Drama	Ji Chang-wook	Won
2013	MBC Drama Awards	Writer(s) of the Year	Jang Young-chul, Jung Kyung-soon	Won
2013	MBC Drama Awards	Best New Actress	Baek Jin-hee	Won
2014	50th Baeksang Arts Awards	Best New Actress (TV)	Baek Jin-hee	Won
2014	9th Seoul International Drama Awards	Best Series Drama	Empress Ki	Won
2014	9th Seoul International Drama Awards	Best Actress	Ha Ji-won	Nominated
2014	7th Korea Drama Awards	Grand Prize (Daesang)	Ha Ji-won	Nominated
2014	7th Korea Drama Awards	Best Drama	Empress Ki	Nominated
2014	7th Korea Drama Awards	Best Production Director	Han Hee, Lee Sung-joon	Nominated
2014	7th Korea Drama Awards	Top Excellence Award, Actor	Ji Chang-wook	Nominated
2014	7th Korea Drama Awards	Excellence Award, Actress	Baek Jin-hee	Nominated
2014	3rd APAN Star Awards	Top Excellence Award, Actor in a Serial Drama	Joo Jin-mo	Nominated
2014	3rd APAN Star Awards	Top Excellence Award, Actress in a Serial Drama	Ha Ji-won	Nominated
2014	3rd APAN Star Awards	Excellence Award, Actor in a Serial Drama	Ji Chang-wook	Nominated
2014	3rd APAN Star Awards	Best Supporting Actress	Baek Jin-hee	Nominated
2014	3rd APAN Star Awards	Best Supporting Actress	Yoon A-jung	Nominated
