= Ki Cha-o =

Goryeo general (1266–1328)

- Born: 1267; Haengju, Goyang County, Gyeonggi Province,Goryeo
- Died: 3 March 1328 (aged 60–61); Goryeo
- Spouse(s): Lady Yi, of Iksan Yi clan
- Children: 5 sons and 3 daughters, including Ki Ch'ŏl and Empress Gi
- Relatives: Ki Kwan (father); Lady Pak of the Juksan Pak clan (mother)
- Military career
- Noble title given by the Yuan dynasty: Prince Yeong-an (Korean: 영안왕; Hanja: 榮安王)

Korean name
- Hangul: 기자오
- Hanja: 奇子敖
- RR: Gi Jao
- MR: Ki Chao

Posthumous name
- Hangul: 장헌
- Hanja: 莊獻
- RR: Jangheon
- MR: Changhŏn

Ki Cha-o (Korean: 기자오; Hanja: 奇子敖; 1267–1328) was a Goryeo military official and nobleman who is known for being the father of Empress Ki, the primary empress of Toghon Temür (Emperor Huizong) of the Yuan dynasty. He was stationed as a commander in Inju (present-day Incheon). During Empress Ki's regency in Yuan, he was granted the title of prince. Through Empress Ki, he eventually became the maternal grandfather of Biligtü Khan (Emperor Zhaozong) of the Northern Yuan dynasty.

== Biography ==
In 1267, Ki Cha-o was born into the Haengju Ki clan. He was the great-grandson of Ki Yun-suk, who had been the vice-director of the Chancellery (문하시랑평장사; 門下侍郎平章事; munhasirang p'yŏngjangsa). He married Lady Yi, the daughter of Yi Haeng-gŏm (이행검; 李幸儉). Via the protected appointments system, he was given his first government office as an executive captain (산원; 散員; sanwŏn). He would later be promoted to Standby Gentleman of the Ministry of War (총부산랑; 摠部散郎; ch'ongbu sanrang). Ki died in 1328.

His third and youngest daughter would be sent to Yuan after his death, and in 1340, she became the third empress of Toghon Temür.

== Family ==
Parents

- Father: Ki Kwan (기관; 1249–?)
- Mother: Princess Consort Yeonheung of the Juksan Park clan (연흥군부인 죽산 박씨; 1253–?)

Consorts and their respective issue(s):

- Grand Lady Samhanguk of the Iksan Yi clan (삼한국대부인 익산 이씨; 1267–?); eldest daughter of Yi Haeng-gŏm (이행검; 1250–1310)
  - Ki Sik (기식; 1382–?), first son
  - Ki Ch'ŏl, Internal Prince Deokyang (기철 덕양부원군; 1284–1356), second son
  - Lady Ki (기씨; 1290–?), first daughter
  - Lady Ki (기씨; 1293–?), second daughter
  - Ki Wŏn (기원; 1294–?), third son
  - Ki Chu (기주; 1295–?), fourth son
  - Ki Yun (기윤; 1298–?), fifth son
  - Empress Gi of the Haengju Ki clan (1315 –1369), third daughter
    - Son-in-law: Toghon Temür, 15th Khagan of the Mongol Emprire
      - Grandson: Biligtü Khan Ayushiridara, Emperor of Northern Yuan Dynasty

== In popular culture ==
- Portrayed by Kim Myung-soo in 2013–2014 MBC TV series Empress Ki.
