= Toqto'a (Yuan dynasty) =

Mongol minister and historian of Yuan Dynasty (1314–1356)

Toqto’a, (Note: • Mongolian: ᠲᠣᠭᠲᠠᠭᠠᠬᠤ Toqtogha; • Cyrillic: Тогтох; • simplified Chinese: 脱脱; traditional Chinese: 脫脫; pinyin: Tuōtuō) courtesy name Dayong (大用), also known as The Great Historian Tuotuo (1314–1356), was a high-ranking minister and an official historian of the Yuan dynasty of China.

He was the author of three of the Twenty-Four Histories, writing the History of Liao, the History of Jin, and the History of Song (the three predecessor Chinese states to the Yuan dynasty). Later in life, he was falsely accused, banished, and murdered. Losing him, the Yuan court might have lost its last chance to defeat the Red Turban Rebellion, which started in the early 1350s against their rule. He was Bayan's nephew.

== Early life and education ==
Toqto’a was born to the Merkid aristocrat Majarday (also rendered as Chuan) in 1314. His uncle was Bayan of the Merkid (d. 1340), who had been raised to the rank of grand councillor during the reign of Toghon Temur (r. 1333–1370), the last Yuan emperor. Toqto’a was given a Confucian education.

== Career ==
Fearing that his uncle's ambitious character would harm their family's prestige, Toqto’a and his father, allied with the Khagan, organized a plot to dismiss Bayan. In March 1340, they closed the gates of the palace walls while Bayan was hunting in the nearby countryside. They refused to let him in and soon afterwards arrested him. Bayan was sent into exile and Toqto’a toppled him. In November Toqto’a replaced Bayan as grand councillor.

In 1343 Toqto’a led a team of officials to quickly compile dynastic histories of the Liao, Jin, and Song dynasties. The immense work was done within a relatively short period (a few years), which caused a lack of proofreading and textual criticism. The three works produced were:

- The History of Liao, or Liao Shi (simplified Chinese: 辽史; traditional Chinese: 遼史; pinyin: Liáo Shǐ; "Dynastic History of the Liao Dynasty"), finalized in 1343.
- The History of Jin, or Jin Shi (Chinese: 金史; pinyin: Jīn Shǐ; "Dynastic History of the Jin Dynasty")
- The History of Song, or Song Shi (Chinese: 宋史; pinyin: Sòng Shǐ; "Dynastic History of the Song Dynasty")

At the time some Chinese scholars argued that as the Khitans were former nomadic barbarians, their Liao dynasty did not deserve a compiled standard official history. Due to the dispute over whether the Liao dynasty should be considered a legitimate dynasty, the Liao Shi was not officially compiled until 1342–1343, when Toqto’a finally decided to treat the Liao, Jin, and Song dynasties all as legitimate dynasties in Chinese history. The compilation of the Liao Shi was finished in one year by highly skilled imperial historians, but without elaborate proofreading and textual criticism. Because of this double time and lack of supporting context, the Liao Shi is known for its technical errors, naiveness, lack of precision and over-lapsing. It has been argued the compilation team did not have suitable contextual material to provide an in-depth analysis, and audacious comments.

Loyal to young Toghon Temür (Emperor Shun of Yuan), Toqto'a helped the emperor overthrow his uncle Bayan Chinsang and defuse tensions between the Qubilaid and classic Confucian scholars at court. During the state-sponsored compilation of the history of the three previous dynasties, Toqto'a insisted that both the southern literati and the Han literati from north China accept the concept of "coexisting legitimate dynasties", which also positioned the Mongol Yuan as unifiers.

He resigned as minister in 1344, seeking to retire, but the emperor brought him back to court in 1349 after struggling with successive years of famine, saying, "Among men there is Toqto'a; among horses there is the Frankish horse; both are the most outstanding of their time."

In 1351, Toqto'a undertook a vast river works project deploying 200,000 men to dredge a new channel for the Yellow River for flood prevention, aiming to reopen the Grand Canal which connected Jiangnan in south China to the northern Mongol capital in Dadu. That year, however, there was widespread rebellion and remilitarisation, which ultimately prevented the reopening of the Grand Canal. In 1352, Toqto'a responded by assembling his own "Yellow Army", recapturing Xuzhou and capturing a well-known Red Turban leader. In 1353, he began a siege of Gaoyou, the last holdout on Grand Canal which had been seized by a salt smuggler, and was on the brink of succeeding when he was abruptly dismissed by the emperor due to machinations in court.

In 1344, however, a grand plan to divert the Yongding River to facilitate water transport to the capital of Dadu (modern Beijing) generated heavy opposition, and Toqto’a resigned, joining his father in Gansu. During the 1330s, plague and famine devastated the Huai River area, while unrest appeared in the South Chinese, Manchurian, and the Tibetan borderlands. Massive flooding of the Yellow River inundated more than a decade of cities, putting the Grand Canal out of service and beginning the river’s migration to a new channel north of the Shandong peninsula. Meanwhile, piracy made the sea route for transporting South Chinese grain to the capital increasingly risky. Toqto'a's successor, the new councillor, Berke-Buqa, was too weak to handle all those issues. In August 1349, Toqto’a was recalled to the imperial capital and reappointed grand councillor.

In the winter of 1350–51, Toqto'a's attempt to suppress the activities of the pirate chief Fang Guozhen failed. With the support of Emperor Toghan-Temür, Toqto’a advocated rerouting the Yellow River back to its southern channel as a way to repair the Grand Canal. In April 1351, he began his great project, employing 150,000 civilian workers, 20,000 soldiers, and 1,845,636 yastuq of paper currency. Earlier issues of paper currency had been limited by silver reserves, but Toqto’a issued 2 million ding of unbacked paper currency to pay for labor and materials. This certainly affected the empire's overall economy.

When the religiously oriented Red Turban Rebellion broke out in Yingzhou in 1351, the Yuan attacks failed. Toqto'a was ordered to march against them and assembled an army of mostly Chinese volunteers in 1353–54. He was successful in defeating the rebels. On October 23, 1352, he retook the strategic city of Xuzhou after a six-day siege. Other provincial officials raised Han Chinese, Mongol, and Miao armies to attack the rebels. By winter of 1353–54, the “Red Turban” movement was virtually extinct. Even so, piracy and the occupation of the Grand Canal at Gaoyou by the salt smuggler Zhang Shicheng still blocked grain shipments from the south and caused hunger in the capital. Toqto’a proposed another grand plan for rice farming in central Hebei, importing 2,000 South Chinese farmers and spending 5 million ding of currency, all the while assembling another army to attack Gaoyou and reopen the Grand Canal.

However, Toqto'a's former protégé and now court rival Hama of the Qanqli and the heir apparent, Ayushiridara, backed by the Emperor's Korean consort Lady Ki, falsely accused him of corruption and induced the Khagan to strip him of his dignities in 1354. They quickly arranged his dismissal and banishment by imperial decree, just as the siege of Gaoyou was nearing victory.

Although Toqto’a had a vast number of loyal troops under him, on January 7, he accepted the Khagan's (Emperor's) decree and gave instructions to his soldiers that they must respect their new commander who had come to replace him. Because of his popularity, many of the troops under his command refused to serve under a new commander and left the army or joined the rebels. While Toqto'a was in exile in Yunnan, he was poisoned by Hama's assassins on January 10, 1356.

== In popular culture ==
- Portrayed by Jin Yi-han in the 2013 television series Empress Ki.
