= Pang Sin-u =

Goryeo eunuch (1267–1343)

- Hangul: 방신우
- Hanja: 方臣祐
- RR: Bang Sinu
- MR: Pang Sinu

Courtesy name
- Hangul: 소공
- Hanja: 小公
- RR: Sogong
- MR: Sogong

Pang Sin-u (Korean: 방신우; Hanja: 方臣祐; 1267 – September 1343) of the Sangju Pang clan, sometimes spelled as Bang Shin-woo, was a eunuch during the late Goryeo period. He served Princess Jeguk.

== Biography ==
=== Early life ===
Pang Sin-u was born in Jungmohyeon (now part of Sangju, North Gyeongsang Province) as the son of Pang Tŭk-se (방득세) and grandson of Pang Yang (방양). He had a sister who married Pak Ryŏ (박려) and had a son, Pak Chi-jŏng (박지정). He later went to the Yuan dynasty where he was given the Mongolian name Manggotae (망고태; 忙古台).

=== In Yuan and later life ===
When attended to Empress Dowager Zhaoxian's banquet?, the mother of Emperor Wuzong of Yuan, he was promoted from Jangjakwonsa (장작원사; 將作院使) to Pyeongjangjeongsa (평장정사; 平章政事). After Wang Wŏn ascended the throne as the 26th Goryeo King, Pang was promoted to Byeoksangsamhanjeonggwang (벽상삼한정광; 壁上三韓正匡) due to his contribution for it.

In 1310, he returned to Goryeo under the order from the Empress to supervised Geumjajanggyeong (금자장경; 金字藏經) and moved to Sinhyo Temple (신효사; 神孝寺) to pray for her blessing and longevity while the authorities were forced to release the prisoners. The new king recognized Pang's dedication and honoured him as Prince Jungmo (중모군; 中牟君) and after that married the daughter of Yi Gwang-si (이광시), a Gaeseong judge (개성판관; 開城判官) and had a son, Pang-Jeol (방절). At this time, he served Empress Taejeong (태정황후; 泰定皇后) and was favoured by her, then given title as a Prince Cheomsa (태자첨사; 太子詹事).

Pang participated in national military service while serving 7 lords and 2 empresses. Because of that, it was said if Gangnam District's land with 4000 radish (무; 畝) and there was a lot of wealth accumulated by receiving the grant which was awarded to him. He later go back to Yuan and later died in there in September 1342. His body was returned to Goryeo and buried in Seonheung Temple (선흥사; 禪興寺) which he had built himself in 1330.

== In popular culture ==
- Portrayed by Lee Moon-sik in the 2013–2014 MBC TV series Empress Ki.
