= Empress Gi =

Korean Yuan Empress consort (1315–1370)

- Empress consort of the Yuan dynasty
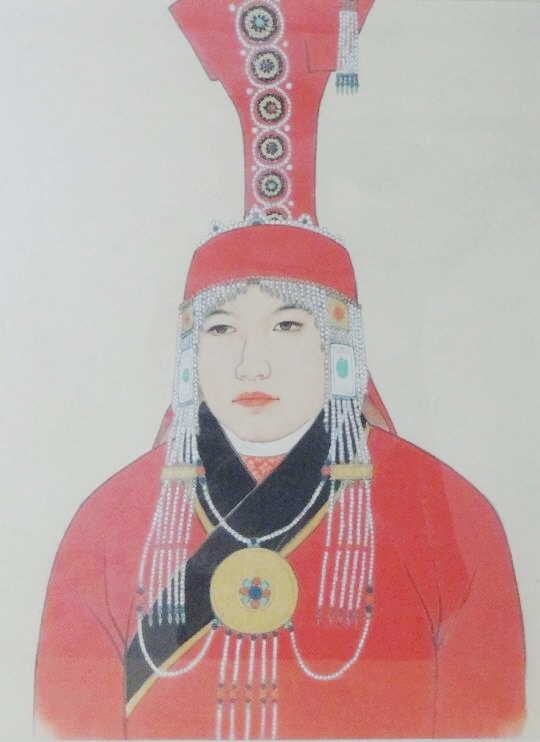

Empress consort of the Yuan dynasty
- Tenure: 1365–10 September 1368
- Predecessor: Empress Bayan Khutugh
- Successor: Dynasty Abolished (Herself as Empress of the Northern Yuan Dynasty) (Empress Ma as Empress of the Ming Dynasty)

Empress consort of Northern Yuan
- Tenure: October 1368–1369
- Successor: Empress Gwon
- Born: 1315; Goyang, Kingdom of Goryeo
- Died: 1369 (aged 53–54); Yingchang, Northern Yuan
- Spouse: Toghon Temür
- Issue: Biligtü Khan
Posthumous name
- Empress Puxian Shusheng (普顯淑聖皇后)
- House: Haengju Ki clan
- Father: Ki Cha-o
- Mother: Lady Yi of the Iksan Yi clan
- Religion: Mahayana Buddhism

Empress Gi or Empress Ki (Korean: 기황후; Hanja: 奇皇后; 1315–1369), also known as Empress Qi (Chinese: 奇皇后) or Öljei Khutuk (Mongolian: Өлзийхутаг; Chinese: 完者忽都), was a Goryeo-born empress consort of the Yuan dynasty. She was one of the primary empresses of Toghon Temür (Emperor Huizong), and the mother of Biligtü Khan (Emperor Zhaozong), who would become an emperor of the Northern Yuan dynasty. Gi was originally from an aristocratic family of the Goryeo dynasty, and first served as a concubine of Toghon Temür. During the last years of the Yuan dynasty, she became one of its most powerful women and political figures, controlling the country economically and politically, and ruling with de facto imperial powers.

== Biography ==
Empress Gi was born in Haengju (행주, 幸州; modern Goyang), Goryeo to a lower-ranked aristocratic family of bureaucrats. Her father was Ki Cha-o. Lady Gi's maternal great-grandmother was Princess Consort Im of the Jangheung Im clan, one of the prominent clans in Goryeo Kingdom. In 1333, the teenaged Lady Gi was among the concubines sent to Yuan by the Goryeo king, who had to provide a certain number of beautiful teenage girls to serve as concubines of the Yuan emperor every three years. It was considered prestigious to marry Goryeo women. Extremely beautiful and skilled at dancing, conversation, singing, poetry, and calligraphy, Lady Gi quickly became the favorite concubine of Toghon Temür. He fell in love with her, and it was soon noted that he was spending far more time in her company than he was with the first empress Danashiri.

The primary empress Danashiri was executed on 22 July 1335 in a purge because of the rebellion of her brother Tangqishi. When Toghon Temür tried to promote Lady Gi to secondary wife, which was contrary to the standard practice of only taking secondary wives from the Mongol clans, it created such opposition at court to this unheard of promotion for a Goryeo woman that he was forced to back down. Bayan, who held the real power in Yuan, opposed the promotion of Lady Gi as did the Empress Dowager, who considered Lady Gi to be cunning. In 1339, when Lady Gi gave birth to a son, Ayushiridara, whom Toghon Temür decided would be his successor, he was finally able to have Lady Gi named as his secondary wife (in 1340). As the favorite wife of the emperor, Lady Gi was a very powerful woman in Yuan. When Bayan was purged, Lady Gi became the secondary empress in 1340 (the primary empress was Bayan Khutugh of the Khongirad).

Toghon Temür increasingly lost interest in governing as his reign continued. During this time power was increasingly exercised by a politically and economically talented Lady Gi. Lady Gi's older brother Ki Ch'ŏl was appointed the commander of the Mongol Eastern Field Headquarters—making him in effect the real ruler of Goryeo—owing to her influence, and she closely monitored Goryeo affairs. Her son was designated Crown Prince in 1353. Using her eunuch Park Bul-hwa (박불화; 朴不花) as her agent, she began a campaign to force the emperor to pass the imperial throne to her son. However, her intentions became known to the emperor and he grew apart from her.

Depending on Lady Gi's position in the imperial capital, her elder brother Ki Ch'ŏl came to threaten the position of the king of Goryeo, which was a client state of the Yuan dynasty. King Gongmin of Goryeo exterminated the Gi family in a coup in 1356 and became independent of the Yuan. Lady Gi responded by selecting Tash Temür as the new king of Goryeo and dispatched troops to Goryeo. However, the Yuan troops were defeated by the army of Goryeo while attempting to cross the Yalu River.

Within the Yuan capital an internal strife was fought between supporters and opponents of the Crown Prince. An opposition leader, Bolud Temür, finally occupied the capital in 1364. Her son fled to Köke Temür who supported him, but Lady Gi was imprisoned by Bolud Temür. Bolud Temür was overthrown by Köke Temür the next year. Once again, she tried to install her son as Khagan, this time with the support of Köke Temür, but in vain. After Bayan Khutugh died, Lady Gi was elevated to the primary empress in December 1365.

The collapse of Yuan dynasty in 1368 forced her to flee to Yingchang's city (now Inner Mongolia). She was shortly captured and died a year before her husband in 1369.

== Family ==
- Father
  - Ki Cha-o (1266–1328)
- Mother
  - Lady Yi of the Iksan Yi clan (익산 이씨; 益山 李氏)
- Siblings
  - Older brother: Ki Sik (기식; 奇軾); died prematurely
  - Older brother: Ki Ch'ŏl (? – 1356)
  - Older brother: Ki Wŏn (기원; 奇轅)
  - Older brother: Ki Chu (기주; 奇輈)
  - Older brother: Ki Yun (기윤; 奇輪)
- Husband
  - Toghon Temür (25 May 1320 – 23 May 1370)
- Issue
  - Son: Biligtü Khan Ayushiridara (必里克圖汗; 23 January 1340 – 28 April/26 May 1378)
    - Daughter-in-law - Empress Gwon of the Andong Gwon clan (권황후; 權皇后; ? – 1378/22 May 1410); daughter of Gwon Gyeom (권겸; 權謙; ? – 1356)
      - Prince Maidilibala (26 March 1363 – 16 May 1375)
      - Princess Ariun (공주; 公主; 14 September 1377 – 15 February 1423)
        - Grandson-in-law: Jorightu Khan Yesüder (卓里克圖汗; 1358–1392)

== In popular culture ==
- Portrayed by Kim Hye-ri in 2005 MBC TV series Shin Don.
- Portrayed by Hyun Seung-min and Ha Ji-won in 2013–2014 MBC TV series Empress Ki.

== See also ==
- Imperial Noble Consort Shujia, a Korean concubine of the Qing Qianlong Emperor

Preceded by Bayan Khutugh	Consort of Toghon Temür; 1365–1370	Succeeded by None
Preceded by Bayan Khutugh	Khatun of the Mongols; 1365–1370	Succeeded by Empress Gwon
Preceded by Bayan Khutugh	Empress of China; 1365–1368	Succeeded by Empress Ma (Ming dynasty)
