= Daliyetemishi =

Daritemish
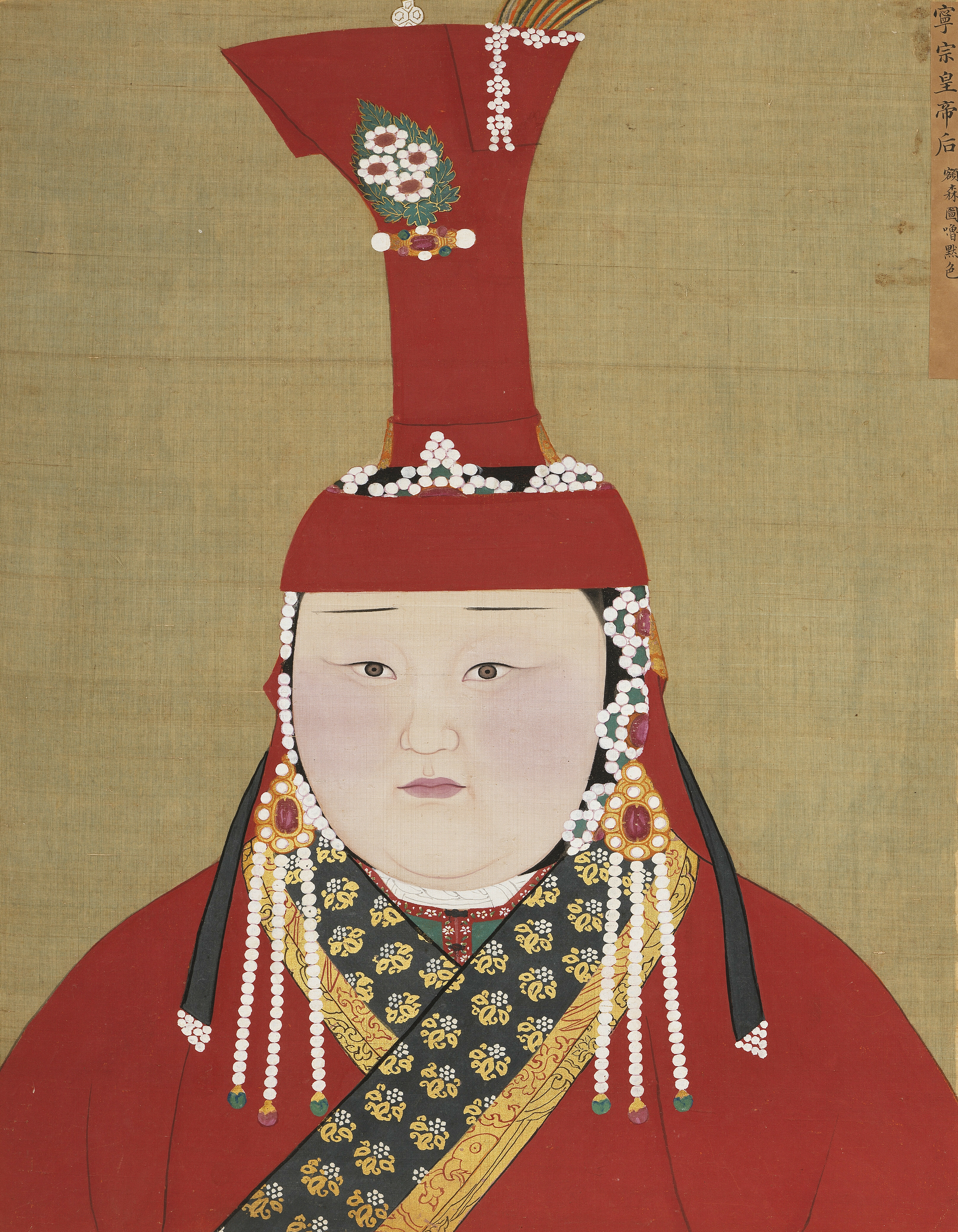

Empress consort of the Yuan dynasty and Khatun of Mongols
- Tenure: 1332
- Predecessor: Empress Budashiri
- Successor: Empress Danashri
- Born: Unknown
- Died: 1368
- Spouse: Rinchinbal Khan
- Father: a member of the Khongirad tribe, name unknown

Daritemish or Daliyetemishi (Mongolian: Дарьтэмиш, Chinese: 答里也忒迷失; r. 1332 CE, died 1368 CE) was an empress consort of the Yuan dynasty of China, married to Rinchinbal Khan (Emperor Ningzong). She was a member of the Onggirat tribe. When she became empress consort, she was near the same age as her new husband, who was seven years old.

== Notes ==
Chinese royalty
Preceded by Budashiri	Empress of the Yuan dynasty 1332	Succeeded by Danashri
