= Köke Temür =

Chinese Yuan Dynasty general

Köke Temür (simplified Chinese: 扩廓帖木尔; traditional Chinese: 擴廓帖木爾; Mongolian: ᠬᠥᠬᠡᠲᠡᠮᠦᠷ, Köketemür, Хөхтөмөр; died 1375), sinicized name Wang Baobao (Chinese: 王保保), was a prominent general of the Yuan dynasty of Mongolia.

== History ==
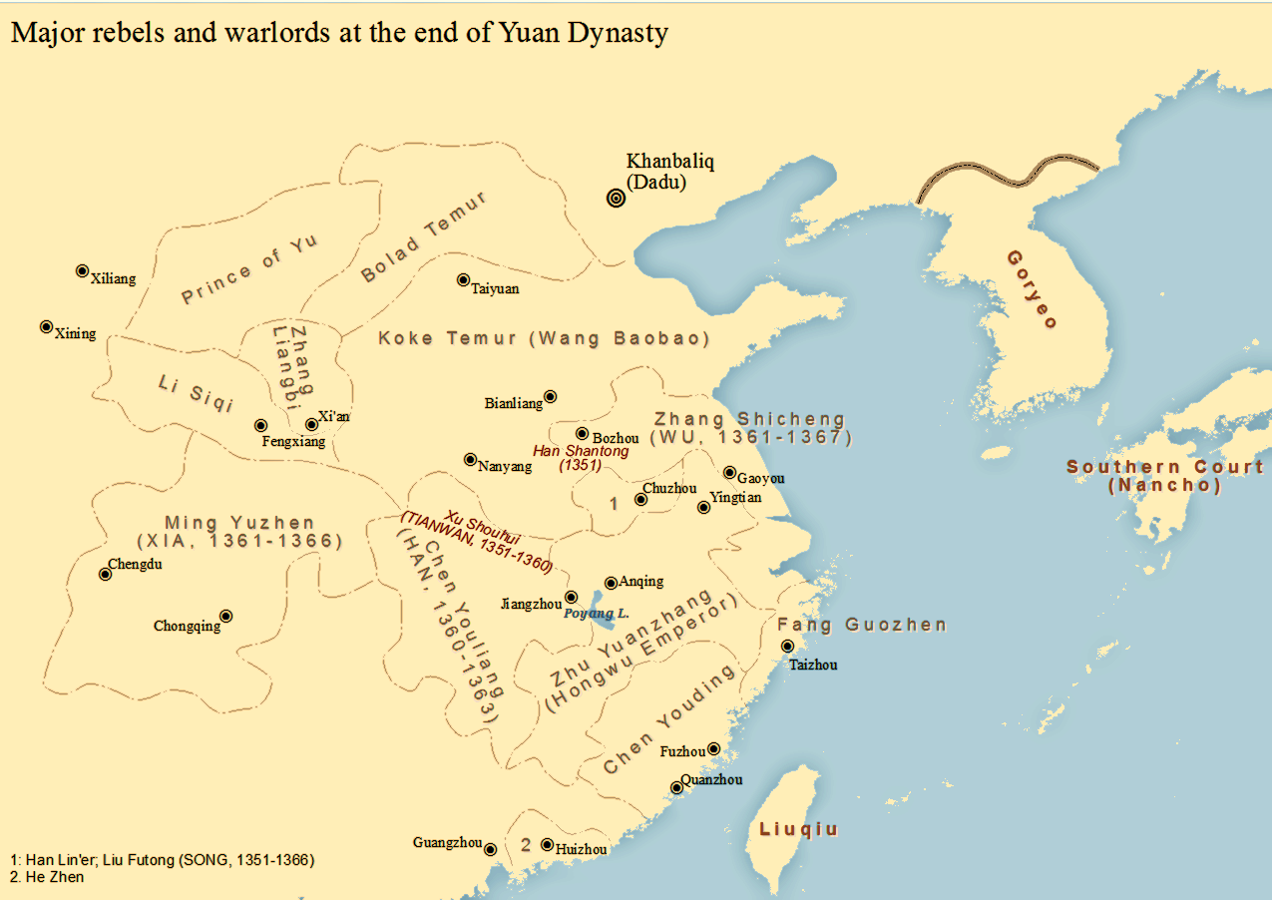
Rebels and warlords at the end of Yuan Dynasty, including territories under Köke Temür's control in 1363.

He was born in Henan province. His paternal line originated in Central Asia, probably of recent Bayad Mongol descent. His mother was of Naiman origin, and was the sister of Chaghan Temür. Köke Temür was adopted by his maternal uncle Chaghan Temür, a Mongol warlord who fought against the Red Turban Rebellion. When his uncle died in war in Shandong in 1362, he succeeded Chaghan Temür's post and corps, and soon demonstrated military talent in battles with the Red Turban Rebels in Shandong.

He intensified a feud with Bolad Temür a Datong-based warlord, and entered Taiyuan to confront him. He took the side of Crown Prince Ayushiridara (future Emperor Zhaozong) against the faction of Toghon Temür (Emperor Huizong) in a factional dispute in Dadu since Bolad Temür supported the anti-crown prince faction.

In 1364, Bolad Temür advanced from Datong on Dadu and seized the reins of the central government under the khan. Crown Prince Ayushiridara fled to Taiyuan to seek support from Köke Temür. The Crown Prince struck back with Köke Temür, and Bolad Temür was betrayed when Köke Temür attacked Dadu in 1365. He reinstated the Crown Prince, and was appointed as vice minister of the Secretariat and the king of Henan in return. However, this conflict helped Zhu Yuanzhang's rise to power in southern China.

Köke Temür commanded the Yuan army against anti-Yuan rebels, but faced betrayal by subordinates including ethnic Han officers who had followed him since the very early stage. What was worse was that he got alienated from Ayushiridara, who was given political and military controls by Toghon Temür. After two major defeats (he fled alone in both occasions), he lost Henan and Taiyuan to the rising Ming corps and fled to Gansu. The Yuan dynasty was forced to retreat from China proper in 1368.

In 1370 when Toghon Temür died and Ayushiridara succeeded to the throne, Koke Temur entered the Mongolian Plateau from Gansu and joined the new khan, who was based in Karakorum. He undertook the defense of the khan. The Hongwu Emperor invited him seven times and offered bribes. But Koke Temur did not abandon his khagan in his misfortune. The most notable service was an overwhelming desert victory over a Ming army led by Xu Da in 1372. It is said that he killed 20,000 Ming soldiers. But in a further encounter against Xu Da in Gansu, Köke Temür's army was badly mauled by the Ming dynasty and forced to flee across the Gobi Desert.

Köke Temür's sister was married to prince Zhu Shuang, the second son of the Hongwu Emperor.

He advanced southward with the Yuan troops to take China proper back for the Yuan remnants (known as the Northern Yuan in historiography), and expanded his influence to Shanxi. However, he died in 1375 and was followed by Ayushiridara in 1378. Their deaths radically weakened the Northern Yuan dynasty, extinguishing any hope of recapturing China proper.

== In popular culture ==
He is featured in Jin Yong's wuxia novel The Heaven Sword and Dragon Saber and its television and movie adaptations as the older brother of one of the heroines, Zhao Min.

He is featured in some Zhu Yuanzhang drama television series such as The Legend of Beggar Emperor and the Big Foot Empress Consort.
