= Danashri =

Danashiri Данашир

Empress consort of the Yuan dynasty
- Tenure: 1333–1335
- Predecessor: Daliyetemishi
- Successor: Bayan Khutugh
- Born: 1320
- Died: 1335 (aged 14–15); Hefei, Yuan Empire
- Spouse: Emperor Huizong of Yuan (m. 1333)
- House: Kipchaks
- Father: El Temür
- Mother: Lady Kipchak
- Religion: Mahayana Buddhism

Danashiri (Mongolian: Данашир, Chinese: 答納失里; 1320–1335) was an ethnic Kipchak empress consort of China's Yuan dynasty, married to Toghon Temür (Emperor Huizong).

She was the daughter of El Temür, the prime minister during the initial years of her husband's reign. She came to be in conflict with the emperor for his infatuation with his concubine, Lady Ki, whom she often ordered to be beaten.

Danashiri was implicated in the failed rebellion of her brother, Tanggici, whom she attempted to protect from being executed. She was exiled to Hefei for trying to defend her brother and later poisoned.

== In popular culture ==
- Portrayed by Baek Jin-hee in 2013 television series Empress Ki.

== Notes ==
Chinese royalty
Preceded by Daliyetemishi	Empress of the Yuan dynasty 1333–1335	Succeeded by Bayan Khutugh
