= El Temür =

Mongol Empire politician in the 12th century

- Died: May 1333
- Issue: Danashiri; Tanggici

El Temür (Chinese: 燕帖木兒; pinyin: Yān Tiēmù'er; Mongolian:ᠡᠯᠲᠡᠮᠦᠷ; died 1333) was an ethnic Kipchak official of the Yuan dynasty. He was behind the coup d'état that installed Tugh Temür (Emperor Wenzong) as Yuan emperor in the capital Khanbaliq in 1328. The restorationists at Khanbaliq won the War of the Two Capitals under the leadership of Tugh Temür and El Temür. After the surrender of Shangdu forces, Tugh Temür abdicated in favour of his brother Kusala (Emperor Mingzong) who was backed by Chagatai Khan Eljigidey and announced Khanbaliq's intent to welcome him. However, Kusala suddenly died only four days after a banquet with Tugh Temür, supposedly killed with poison by El Temür, who purged pro-Kusala officials and brought power to warlords, whose despotic rule marked the decline of the Yuan dynasty.

His daughter, Danashiri, married Toghon Temür (Emperor Huizong) and bore him a son but he died when he was a child. El Temür also had a son, Tanggici, who was also an officer.

El Temür became ill and died in 1333 and his children Danashiri and Tanggici were subsequently murdered by former co-conspirator Bayan in 1335.

El Temür was the grandson of Yuan general Tutuha (土土哈 1237–1297).

== In popular culture ==
- Portrayed by Jeon Gook-hwan in 2013–2014 MBC TV series Empress Ki.

== Descendants of Qurusman ==
- Qurusman（忽魯速蠻/hūlŭsùmán）
  - Baltučaq（班都察/bāndōuchá）
    - Tudγaγ（土土哈/Tŭtŭhā; توتقاق/Tūtqāq）
      - Taγačar（塔察兒/tǎcháér）
      - Tai buqa（太不花/Tàibùhuā）
      - Čong'ur（牀兀兒/Chuángwùér; جونكقور/Jūnkqūr）
        - Sevinču buqa（小雲失不花/Xiǎoyúnshī bùhuā）
        - Elči buqa（燕赤不花/yànchì bùhuā）
        - El temür（燕帖木兒/Yàntiēmùér）
          - Tangkiš（唐其勢/Tángqíshì）
          - Taraqai（塔剌海/Tǎlàhǎi）
          - Današiri（答納失里/Dānàshīlǐ）
        - Sadun（撒敦/Sādūn）
        - El tuqar（燕禿哈兒/Yàn tūhāér）
        - Dari（答里/Dálǐ）
        - Bübeqan（潑皮罕/Pōpíhǎn）
      - Berke buqa（別里不花/Biélǐ bùhuā）
      - Temür buqa（帖木兒不花/Tiēmùér bùhuā）
      - Qarči（歓差/huānchā）
      - Yoliγ temür（岳里帖木兒/Yuèlǐ tiēmùér）
      - Dalgurban（断古魯班/Duàngŭlŭbān）
