= Yingchang =

One of the important cities in the Yuan dynasty

Coordinates: 43°15′17″N 116°27′42″E

Yingchang (Chinese: 應昌; pinyin: Yìngchāng) was one of the important cities in the Yuan dynasty. It was situated on Lake Taal Nor in modern Heshigten Banner, Inner Mongolia, China.

The city of Yingchang was built by the Khongirad Mongols in 1271, the same year that Kublai (Emperor Shizu) established the Yuan dynasty. The city was the administrative seat of the Prince of Lu (魯王). This square-walled city incorporated symmetrical elements, wide axial streets from the gates led to an administrative compound in the center north area, emulating the Tang style.

Shortly after Toghon Temür (Emperor Huizong), the last Yuan emperor, lost Dadu and Shangdu to the Ming dynasty in 1368 and 1369 respectively, the Yuan remnants (referred to as the Northern Yuan in historiography) established their capital at Yingchang. After the death of Toghon Temür in this city in 1370, the Ming armies under Li Wenzhong (李文忠) managed to capture Yingchang, one of the major cities still in the hands of the Northern Yuan, in the same year. Ayushiridara (Emperor Zhaozong) fled north soon afterwards and later made Karakorum the capital city.

The Northern Yuan once took back Yingchang in 1374, but the Ming recaptured the city in 1380.
