= Haengju Ki clan =

Korean clan from Gyeonggi Province

- Country: Korea
- Current region: Goyang
- Founder: Ki Usŏng
- Connected members: Empress Gi; Ki Cha-o; Ki Bo-bae; Ki Dong-min; Ki Sung-yueng; Ki Hui-hyeon; Gi Hyeong-do
- Website: http://www.hjkee.com/

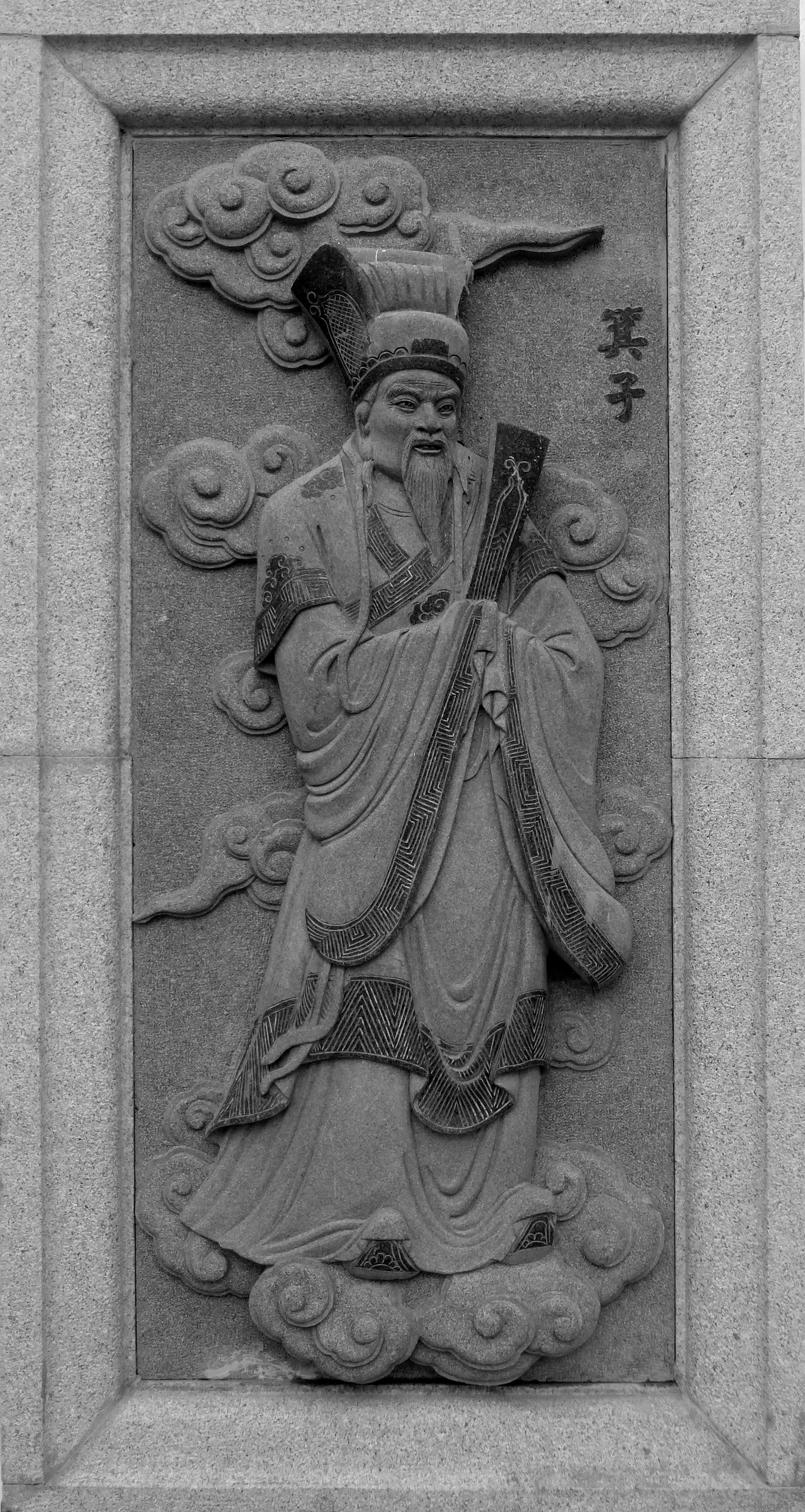
Kija

Haengju Ki clan (Korean: 행주 기씨; Hanja: 幸州 奇氏) is a Korean clan. Their Bon-gwan is in Goyang, Gyeonggi Province. According to the 2015 South Korean census, the population of the Haengju Ki clan was 27,379. Their founder was Ki Usŏng who was a descendant of Jun of Gojoseon, the last king of Gija Joseon. Usŏng was the eldest son of Hun who was the 7th descendant of Jun. Usŏng's two younger brothers, U-ryang and U-pyŏng, became the progenitors of the Han and Sunwoo families respectively. Ki Usŏng was Gija’s 48th generation descendant.

== See also ==
- Korean clan names of foreign origin
