= Biligtü Khan Ayushiridara =

Emperor of Northern Yuan from 1370 to 1378

Emperor Zhaozong of Northern Yuan 北元昭宗 Biligtü Khan 必里克圖汗 ᠪᠢᠯᠢᠭᠲᠦ ᠬᠠᠭᠠᠨ
- Emperor of the Great Yuan
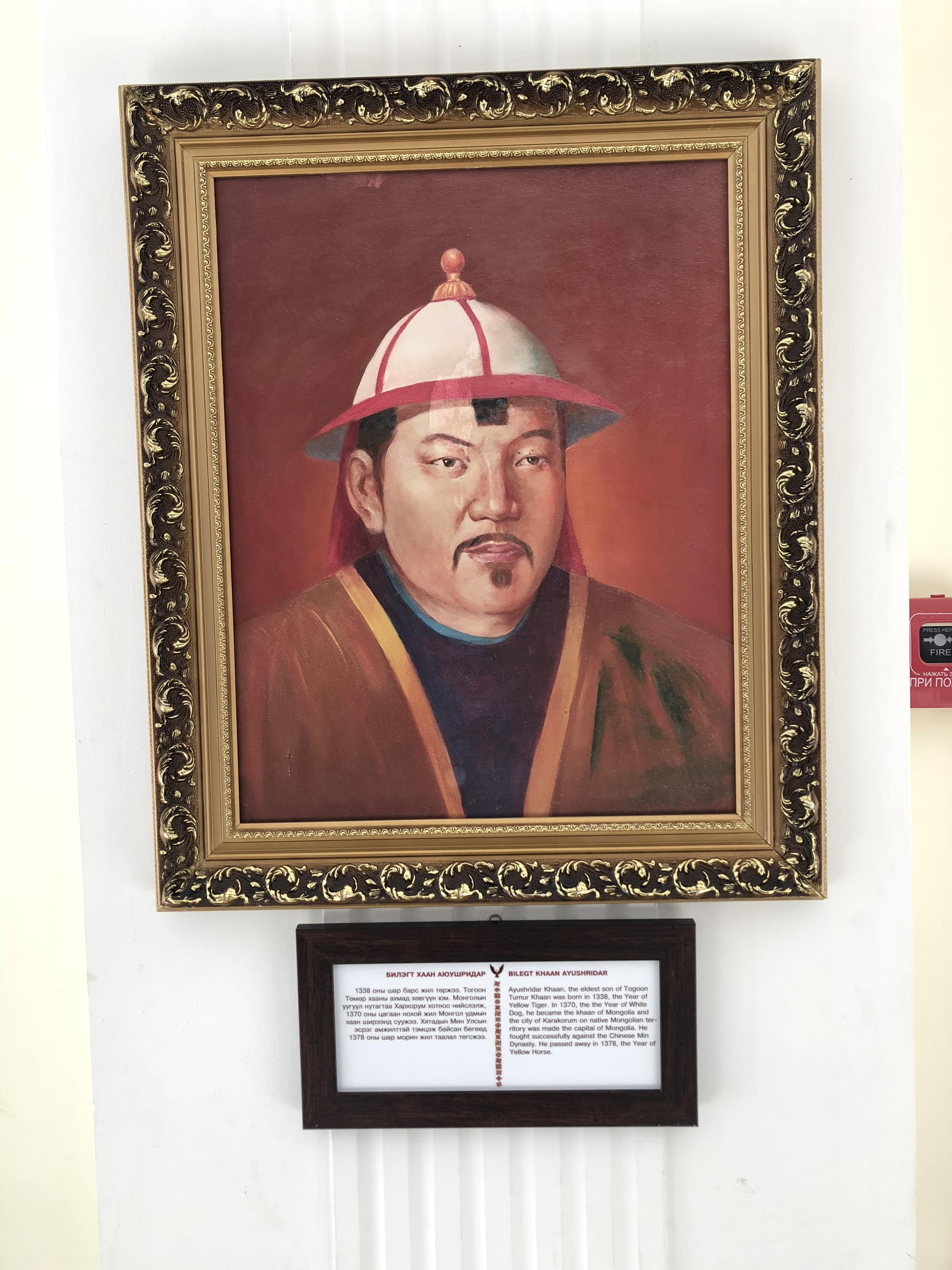

Emperor of the Northern Yuan dynasty
- Reign: 6 June 1370 – 28 April 1378 / 26 May 1378
- Coronation: 6 June 1370
- Predecessor: Ukhaghatu Khan Toghon Temür
- Successor: Uskhal Khan Tögüs Temür
- Born: 23 January 1340
- Died: between 28 April 1378 and 26 May 1378 (aged 38); Karakorum, Northern Yuan
- Spouse: Empress Kwŏn (m. 1361)
- Issue: 2
Names
- Mongolian: ᠠᠶᠣᠰᠢᠷᠢᠳᠠᠷ᠎ᠠ; Chinese: 愛猷識理答臘; Ayushiridara
Era dates
- Xuanguang (宣光): 1371–1378
Regnal name
- Biligtü Khan (ᠪᠢᠯᠢᠭᠲᠦ ᠬᠠᠭᠠᠨ; 必里克圖汗)
Posthumous name
- Emperor Wucheng Hexiao (武承和孝皇帝)
Temple name
- Zhaozong (昭宗)
- House: Borjigin
- Dynasty: Northern Yuan
- Father: Toghon Temür
- Mother: Empress Ki

Biligtü Khan (Mongolian: Билэгт Хаан; ᠪᠢᠯᠢᠭᠲᠦ; Chinese: 必里克圖汗), born Ayushiridara (Mongolian: Аюуши Ридара; ᠠᠶᠣᠰᠢᠷᠢᠳᠠᠷ᠎ᠠ; Chinese: 愛猷識理達臘; Sanskrit: आयुष्य तल् means preservative of life), also known by his temple name as the Emperor Zhaozong of Northern Yuan (Chinese: 北元昭宗; 23 January 1340 – April or May 1378), was an emperor of the Northern Yuan dynasty, reigning from 1370 to 1378. He ascended to the throne after the death of his father Toghon Temür (Emperor Shun). In 1372, he defeated an invading Ming dynasty army and recaptured some regions that were previously lost to the newly founded Ming dynasty.

== Early life ==
Ayushiridara was born in 1340 the eldest son of Toghon Temür (Emperor Shun of Yuan) and Lady Gi, who came from a lower-ranked Goryeo aristocratic family who would eventually be highly influential during her husband's reign. He was given his earliest tuition in Chinese at the house of his father's minister, Toqto'a, at age ten. Toghon Temür's principal empress, Danashiri, bore only one son who died in infancy. The Mongol noyans mostly preferred another Borjigin (Mongol noble) heir, rather than Ayushiridara, as his mother was a former palace maid and tea server. Only after the purge of Danashiri's family and the death of Bayan, were he and his mother accepted at the Yuan court. Induced by his Korean empress, Lady Gi, the Yuan emperor Toghon Temür scheduled to elect his heir apparent in 1353. However, Toqto'a delayed the schedule for unknown reasons. This aroused the anger of the latter's political enemies. The chief minister and his former protégé, Hama of the "Qangli", and Ayushiridara, with the support of his mother, the Empress, Lady Gi, accused Toqto'a of corruption and violation of law while he was fighting the Red Turban Rebellion in 1354. This situation halted Toqto'a, who had been successful in defeating the rebellion, and he was stripped of his dignities and sent to Hoai-nan into exile.

Hama was made first minister and all power was then in his hands. Elated by this success, Hama decided to raise Ayushiridara to the throne. This plot was discovered, Hama was sentenced to exile and strangled by his enemies there in 1356, and Ayushiridara was pardoned. When he became crown prince in 1353, it caused internal strife between his supporters and opponents. Seven years later he and Lady Gi wished the first minister, Tai ping, to convince the Khagan to resign and leave the dominion to Ayushiridara. When Tai ping refused, they poisoned the minister's partisans and forced him to resign. Power passed to a eunuch, Papuhwa, and to Cho Sekin, two weak men. An opposition leader, Bolad-Temür, occupied the capital in 1364. Ayushiridara was ordered back by his father to Dadu. Feeling himself not powerful enough to resist Bolad-Temür's large army, Ayushiridara fled to the Yuan general, Köke Temür. When Bolad-Temür learned that Ayushiridara was advancing with troops, he arrested Lady Gi and forced her to recall her son to the capital. However, Bolad-Temür's commanders deserted to Köke Temür. Toghon Temür secretly ordered Ho chang, son of the prince of Wei chun, to murder Bolad-Temür. After the latter's death, Köke Temür defeated Bolad-Temür's commander Tukiel in 1365. Ayushiridara forced Köke Temür to persuade the Emperor to resign in his favor. The Emperor was unwilling to abdicate, but he appointed his son lieutenant in the Yuan. Köke Temür tried to prevent it, but failed and was stripped of his dignities.

In 1368 the Yuan dynasty was overthrown by the Ming dynasty, and Toghon Temür Khan and his family fled north to Shangdu from Dadu. In 1370 Toghon Temür died in Yingchang. The Ming army captured the city and relatives and Maidarbal, a son of Ayushiridara who escaped safely to Karakorum where he was officially enthroned as Khagan of the Mongols with the Mongolian title of Biligtü (Intelligent).

== Reign ==
Shortly after the succession, he fled to Karakorum and he changed the era name to Xuanguang (宣光, 1371–1378) there. Biligtü Khan made Köke Temür his commander in chief and chingsang of the right hand of the Central Government. The Yuan remnants in Mongolia homeland, known as the Northern Yuan dynasty, still remained overall a strong power during his reign. Its dominions covered the areas from Northeast China to Xinjiang.

Hongwu Emperor demanded Biligtü Khan Ayushiridara to give up his arms several times but failed. In 1372, the former dispatched the Ming army of 150,000 men to Mongolia. Biligtü Khan sent Köke Temür's army against the central division of the Ming army under Xu Da. Xu Da's troops reached Tuul River within 20 days. However, they were routed and their commander barely escaped with a few of his men. The eastern division of the Ming army advanced to Kherlen River, pillaging the Mongolian camps en route. They were suddenly defeated and forced to retreat to Orkhon where another bloody battle ensued. After that they fought the Mongol army under Halajchani and was finally defeated near Karakorum. The western division of the Ming army was forced to retreat due to other divisions' failures, though, they won a series of places.

Ayushiridara asked the assistance from the Yuan's former vassal King Gongmin of Goryeo to fight against the Ming dynasty of China. In his letter to Gongmin, Biligtü Khan says:

"...Oh king, you are a descendant of Genghis Khan same as me. Therefore, we wish you to work with us to establish justice and truth under the heaven..."

On the contrary, King Gongmin refused to help and started an opposition policy against the Mongols, and retook their lands, which were annexed by the Yuan dynasty in the 1270s. Hong Ryun and Choe Mansaeng killed Gongmin in 1374. Yi Inim killed them and sent envoys to the Mongols in Liaoyang and Biligtü Khan quickly recognized the legitimacy of King U, puppet of Yi Inim. Biligtü Khan asked Goryeo to send troops for a joint attack against the Ming fortress. The Goryeo court cautiously refused to help again.

The Mongols conquered Funin and Suijin districts in Sinhe, Liaoning and Hebei provinces in 1373, cutting the Ming from Liaodong. In 1375, Naghachu, a Mongol official in Liaoyang province invaded the Liaodong Peninsula with aims of restoring the Mongols to power and succeeded with the support of the pro-Mongol Jurchens. The Ming ceased its raids into the Northern Yuan. Biligtü Khan's greatest general, Köke Temür, died in 1375. Biligtü Khan Ayushiridara died in 1378 and his half-brother, Tögüs Temür, succeeded to the throne.

== Family ==
- Father: Toghon Temür (25 May 1320 - 23 May 1370)
  1. Grandfather: Khutughtu Khan Kusala (22 December 1300 - 30 September 1329)
  2. Grandmother: Mailati of the Karluks (迈来迪) (? – 1320)
- Mother: Empress Gi (1315 - 1369)
  1. Grandfather: Ki Cha-o (1266 - 1328)
  2. Grandmother: Lady Yi of Iksan Yi clan (익산 이씨, 益山 李氏)

Consorts and issue(s):

- Empress Kwŏn, of the Andong Kwŏn clan (權皇后 安东权氏, 29 April 1342 - 1378 or 22 May 1410)
  1. Elbeg Nigülesügchi Khan (1362-1399), first son (Maidilibala in Sanskrit)
  2. Second son (26 March 1363 – 16 May 1375)
  3. Princess Ariun, first daughter
    1. Son-in-law - Jorightu Khan Yesüder (1358 - 1392)

== In popular culture ==
- Portrayed by Seo Sung-kwang, Kim Jong-ho, and Lee Poong-woon in the 2005–2006 MBC TV series Shin Don.
- Portrayed by Kim Jin-woo and Lee Shi-woo in the 2013-2014 MBC TV series Empress Ki.

== See also ==
- List of khans of the Northern Yuan dynasty

Biligtü Khan Ayushiridara House of Borjigin Died: 1378
Regnal titles
Preceded by Toghon Temür, Emperor Huizong	Emperor of the Northern Yuan dynasty 1370–1378	Succeeded by Uskhal Khan, The Last Emperor
