= Bayan of the Merkit =

Bayan of the Merkit (died 1340), or Bayan (Chinese: 伯顔; pinyin: Bóyán), was a Mongol general of the Merkit clan and an official in the Yuan dynasty.

== Life ==
Bayan was born into a family with military background. Many of his family members had served as soldiers during the Mongol conquest of Eurasia. In 1307, Bayan himself received the title "Baturu".

During the reign of Külüg Khan (Emperor Wuzong of Yuan), Bayan was appointed to a number of positions in the court. He became a Darughachi in 1309, and then held several provincial posts during the reign of Ayurbarwada Buyantu Khan (Emperor Renzong of Yuan), namely the Tong Pingzhangshi (vaguely, the "vice prime minister") of Jiangzhe province, Jiangxi province and Henan province. It is said that he did not tolerate any local bullies who took advantage of the poor.

At the turn of the 13th/14th centuries Bayan and the ethnic Turk El Temür were members of the group around Qaishan, a nephew of Temür Khan who was appointed to defend Mongolia against the Chagatai Khanate under Kaidu, the grandson of Ögedei. In one battle, he repelled and chased the Ögedeid army; and was given the title of Baghatur. After Temür's death, Qaishan emerged as the new Yuan emperor, and Bayan was among those who received an official position as a reward. Later, Bayan was governor of Henan. Historians describe him as a traditionalist who attempted to preserve Mongolian culture while he is seen as a violent aristocrat by some.

In 1328 Bayan rendered great service during the enthronement of Jayaatu Khan Tugh Temür (Emperor Wenzong of Yuan). The Khan rewarded him with the position of left chancellor, along with countless pieces of gold and silver as well as privileges in the court.

In the conflicts about the succession of Jayaatu Khan Tugh Temür after 1332, Bayan broke with El Temür and supported Toghon Temür (Emperor Huizong of Yuan), who ascended the throne in 1333 (and who would lose China proper in 1368). He was appointed commander of kheshig, composed of Mongols, Kypchaks, Russians and Asuds in 1334. Until 1335 Bayan succeeded in annihilating El Temür's sons and family. Bayan began concentrating in his person official positions that had not been so concentrated before. He implemented radical policies (or perhaps conservative policies from the Mongol point of view), abolishing the imperial examination system, and trying to contain the number of ethnic Han in the upper echelons of the Yuan bureaucracy. He once suggested the emperor kill those Han people of the more numerous surnames: Zhang, Wang, Liu, Li and Zhao to suppress the rebellion. In 1339 he became grand chancellor (Chinese: 大丞相; pinyin: dà chéngxiàng). By then, he had probably gone too far. In any case, he was toppled in 1340 by his nephew Toqto'a. Shortly after that, his purges were called off and his policies were reversed.

According to Chinese historians, Toqto complained to his father that his uncle Bayan's authoritarian tendencies might bring disaster on their clan. Toghon Temür, the emperor, also began to worry about the exceedingly ostentatious power of Bayan. Wu Zhifang, a Confucian scholar in the court, suggested Toqto take action against Bayan. In the end, Bayan was removed from the central theatre of the imperial court.

== In popular culture ==
- Portrayed by Kim Young-ho in the 2013 television series Empress Ki.
