= Toghon Temür =

Emperor of Yuan dynasty from 1333 to 1368

Emperor Huizong of Yuan 元惠宗 Ukhaghatu Khan 烏哈噶圖汗 ᠤᠬᠠᠭᠠᠲᠤ ᠬᠠᠭᠠᠨ
- Emperor of China (11th Emperor of the Yuan dynasty)
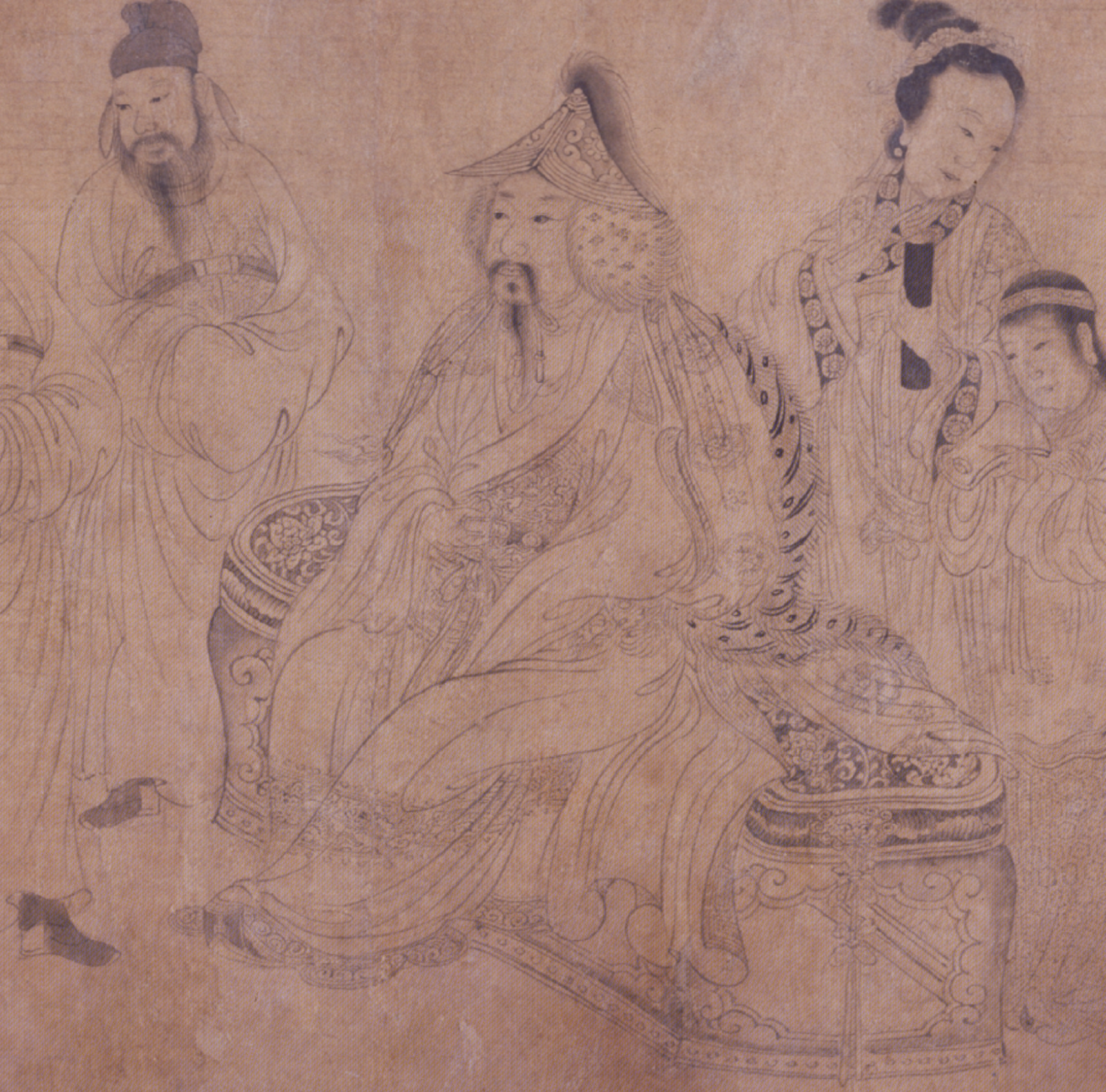
- Portrait of Toghon Temür, 14th century

Emperor of the Yuan dynasty
- Reign: 19 July 1333 – 10 September 1368
- Coronation: 19 July 1333
- Predecessor: Rinchinbal Khan
- Successor: Himself as Emperor of the Northern Yuan dynasty

Emperor of the Northern Yuan dynasty
- Reign: 10 September 1368 – 23 May 1370
- Predecessor: Himself as Emperor of the Yuan dynasty
- Successor: Biligtü Khan Ayushiridara
- Born: 25 May 1320
- Died: 23 May 1370 (aged 49); Yingchang, present-day Inner Mongolia
- Spouses: Empress Danashiri (m. 1333; executed 1335); Empress Bayan Khutugh (m. 1337–1365); Empress Gi (m. 1365–1369)
Names
- Mongolian: ᠲᠤᠭᠤᠨᠲᠡᠮᠤᠷ simplified Chinese: 妥懽帖睦尔; traditional Chinese: 妥懽帖睦爾; Toghon Temür
Full name
- Given name: Toghon Temür
Era dates
- Yuantong (元統; Yuántǒng): 1333–1335 (Later) Zhiyuan (至元; Zhìyuán): 1335–1340; Zhizheng (至正; Zhìzhèng): 1341–1370
Regnal name
- Ukhaghatu Khan (ᠤᠬᠠᠭᠠᠲᠤ ᠬᠠᠭᠠᠨ; 烏哈噶圖汗)
Posthumous name
- Emperor Shun (Note: This posthumous name was conferred by the Ming dynasty.) (順皇帝)
Temple name
- Huizong (Note: This temple name was conferred by the Northern Yuan dynasty.) (惠宗)
- House: Borjigin
- Dynasty: Yuan (1333–1368); Northern Yuan (1368–1370)
- Father: Khutughtu Khan Kusala
- Mother: Mailaiti of the Karluks
- Religion: Tibetan Buddhism

Toghon Temür (Mongolian: Тогоон Төмөр, romanized: Togoon Tömör; simplified Chinese: 妥懽帖睦尔; traditional Chinese: 妥懽帖睦爾; pinyin: Tuǒhuān Tiēmù'ěr; 25 May 1320 – 23 May 1370), also known by his temple name as Emperor Huizong of Yuan and by his posthumous name as Emperor Shun of Yuan, was the last emperor of the Yuan dynasty and the first emperor of the Northern Yuan dynasty. He was a son of Kusala (Emperor Mingzong).

Toghon Temür acceded to the throne in 1333 after years of succession disputes following his father's death. His early reign was dominated by powerful ministers, first El Temür and then Bayan, until he engineered Bayan's removal in 1340 with the help of Toqto'a. Toqto'a's first administration (1340–1344) oversaw the completion of the official histories of the Liao, Jin, and Song dynasties. During the latter part of his reign, widespread natural disasters and fiscal crises fuelled popular unrest, culminating in the Red Turban Rebellion of 1351. After the rebel leader Zhu Yuanzhang established the Ming dynasty and captured Khanbaliq in 1368, Toghon Temür retreated to the Mongolian steppe. The remnant court, conventionally called the Northern Yuan, continued to claim the title of Emperor of China. Toghon Temür died at Yingchang in 1370 and was succeeded by his son Biligtü Khan Ayushiridara.

He was a patron of Tibetan Buddhism, studying under successive Karmapas of the Karma Kagyu school. He also invited the Jonang scholar Dölpopa Shérab Gyeltsen to teach at his court, but Dölpopa declined.

== Names and titles ==
Toghon Temür's personal name is written in Classical Mongolian as ᠲᠤᠭᠤᠨ ᠲᠡᠮᠤᠷ and in modern Mongolian as Mongolian: Тогоон Төмөр, romanized: Togoon Tömör (Mongolian pronunciation: [tʰɔʁɔ́ːɴ tʰɵ́mɵr]). In Chinese sources it is rendered as simplified Chinese: 妥懽帖睦尔; traditional Chinese: 妥懽帖睦爾; pinyin: Tuǒhuān Tiēmù'ěr.

The Northern Yuan dynasty granted him the temple name Huizong (Chinese: 惠宗; pinyin: Huìzōng). The Ming dynasty bestowed the posthumous name Emperor Shun (simplified Chinese: 顺皇帝; traditional Chinese: 順皇帝; pinyin: Shùn Huángdì); the character shùn (順) means "compliant". His Mongol regnal name was Ukhaghatu Khan (ᠤᠬᠠᠭᠠᠲᠤ ᠬᠠᠭᠠᠨ; 烏哈噶圖汗).

During his reign he used three era names: Yuantong (元統, 1333–1335), a later Zhiyuan (至元, 1335–1340), and Zhizheng (至正, 1341–1370). The Zhizheng era is frequently cited in scholarship and on dated artefacts such as the David Vases.

== Early life ==
Toghon Temür was born in 1320 to Kusala, then in exile in Central Asia. His mother, Mailaiti, was a descendant of Arslan Khan, a chief of the Karluks, a Turkic tribal confederacy.

A folk legend recorded in the 14th-century text Gengshēn Waishǐ (Chinese: 庚申外史) claimed that Zhao Xian, the former Southern Song emperor who had surrendered to the Yuan as a child, fathered Toghon Temür through an affair with Mailaiti late in his life. (Note: Modern historians generally regard this story as political propaganda without historical basis.) The Mongols circulated a parallel story asserting that Toghon Temür had fathered the Yongle Emperor of the Ming dynasty.

=== Path to the throne ===
Following the War of the Two Capitals, a civil war triggered by the death of Yesün Temür (Emperor Taiding) in 1328, the young Toghon Temür accompanied his father to Shangdu. After Kusala died under suspicious circumstances and his younger brother was restored to the throne as Jayaatu Khan Tugh Temür (Emperor Wenzong), Toghon Temür was removed from court. He was first exiled to Goryeo and later to Guangxi in southern China. During this period, his stepmother Babusha was executed.

When Emperor Wenzong died in 1332, his widow, Empress Dowager Budashiri, honoured his deathbed wish by supporting the succession of Kusala's line rather than Wenzong's own son, El Tegüs. However, it was not Toghon Temür but his younger half-brother Rinchinbal who was first enthroned, only to die two months later. The de facto ruler, El Temür, attempted to install El Tegüs in his place but was overruled by Empress Budashiri. Toghon Temür was recalled from Guangxi, but El Temür—who was suspected of involvement in Emperor Mingzong's death—delayed the enthronement for some six months. Toghon Temür finally ascended the throne in 1333, after El Temür's death.

== Reign ==
=== Early reign (1333–1340) ===
The new emperor appointed his cousin El Tegüs as crown prince, as he was ward of El Tegüs' mother, Empress Dowager Budashiri. Despite El Temür's death, Toghon Temür remained constrained by powerful court figures. Chief among them was Bayan, who assumed the role of chief minister of the Secretariat and suppressed a rebellion by El Temür's son Tang Ki-se. Bayan carried out a series of political purges and suspended the imperial examination system.

In 1333, Toghon Temür first encountered Lady Gi, a Korean woman who had been sent to China sometime in the late 1320s as part of what the historian Kyung Moon Hwang has described as "human tribute"—the practice by which the kings of Goryeo were required to send young women to serve as concubines after the Mongol invasions. Toghon Temür sought to make Lady Gi a secondary wife, but the proposal was contrary to the standard practice of selecting secondary wives only from Mongol clans and was blocked by court opposition. After she bore a son in 1339, Toghon Temür secured her appointment as secondary wife the following year.

As Toghon Temür matured, he grew increasingly dissatisfied with Bayan's domination. In 1340 he allied with Bayan's own nephew, Toqto'a, and removed Bayan from power in a coup. He subsequently dismissed El Tegüs and Empress Budashiri from court.

=== Toqto'a's first administration (1340–1344) ===
Under Toqto'a, the court reversed Bayan's purges, restored the imperial examination system, and recalled many Chinese literati who had retired or been exiled. A new era name, Zhizheng (Chinese: 至正), was proclaimed in 1341.

Toqto'a also oversaw the completion of the long-stalled official histories of the Liao, Jin, and Song dynasties, finished in 1345. Toqto'a resigned from office with Toghon Temür's approval in June 1344, ending his first term. Several short-lived administrations followed between 1344 and 1349. In 1347 the emperor forced Toqto'a into Gansu with assistance from officers formerly loyal to Kusala and Yesün Temür.

=== Crises and the Red Turban Rebellion (1344–1368) ===
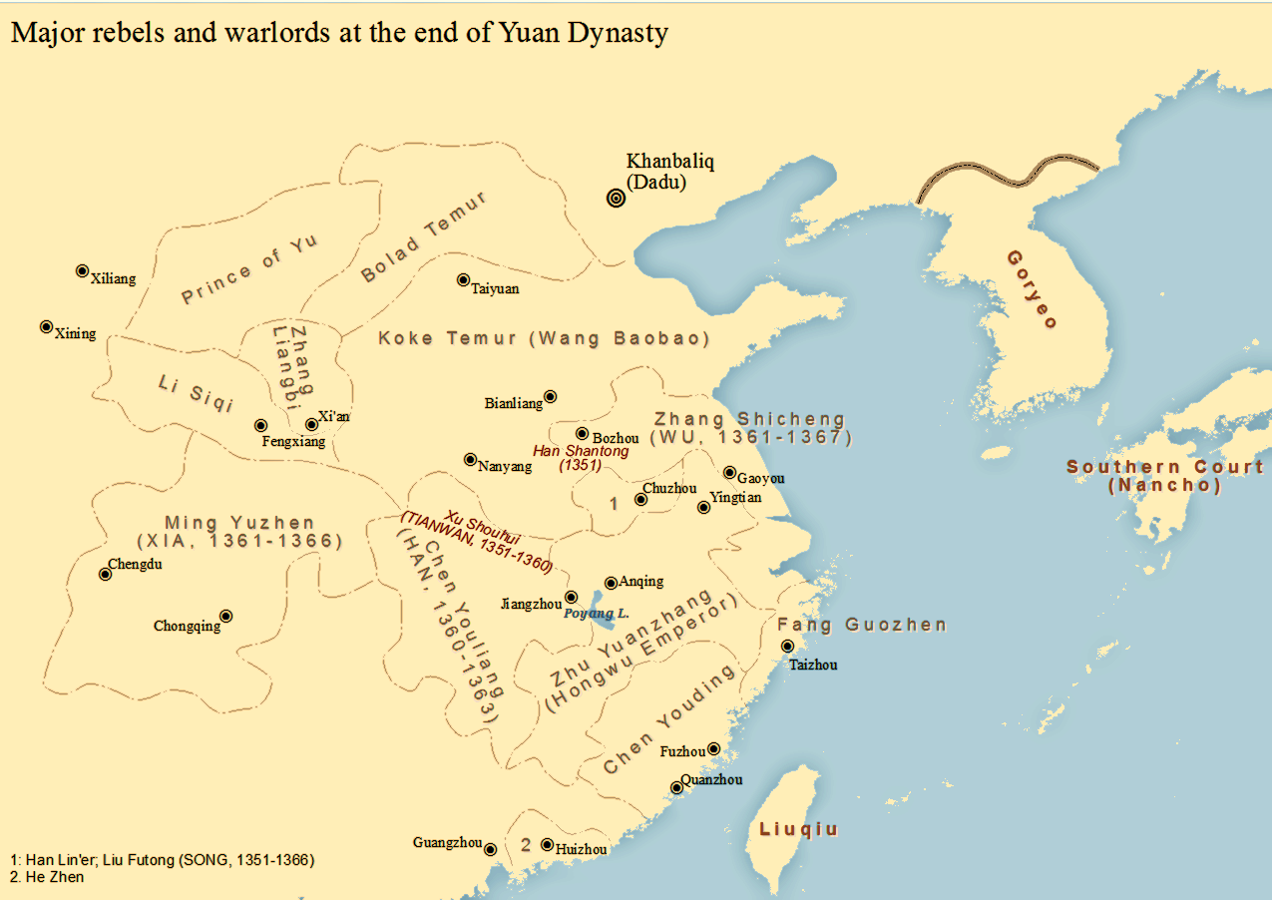
Rebels and warlords in 1363 during the late reign of Toghon Temür.

From the mid-1340s onward, the countryside was beset by natural disasters—droughts, floods, and resulting famines—while the government faced currency depreciation and falling tax revenues. Its inability to provide effective relief cost it popular support. In 1348, illicit salt dealers disaffected by the state salt monopoly launched a rebellion, setting off further revolts across the empire.

In 1349, Toghon Temür recalled Toqto'a, beginning a second and very different term. When the large-scale Red Turban Rebellion erupted in 1351, Toqto'a raised a large army against the rebels. In 1354, however, Toghon Temür dismissed Toqto'a. The dismissal weakened the court's capacity to respond to the rebellion and increased reliance on regional commanders.

Toghon Temür gradually withdrew from active governance. His son Ayushiridara, designated crown prince in 1353, attempted to assert power and came into conflict with the emperor's own courtiers, who dominated political affairs. Empress Gi and a chief minister persuaded Ayushiridara to move against the courtiers. Toghon Temür proved unable to mediate the dispute but had the minister executed.

In 1364, the Shanxi-based warlord Bolad Temür occupied Khanbaliq and expelled the crown prince from the winter capital. Ayushiridara allied with the Henan-based warlord Köke Temür and defeated Bolad Temür the following year, but the fighting weakened central authority still further. In 1365, Toghon Temür finally elevated Empress Gi to first empress and designated her son Ayushiridara as first in the line of succession.

== Relations with other states ==
=== Avignon Papacy ===
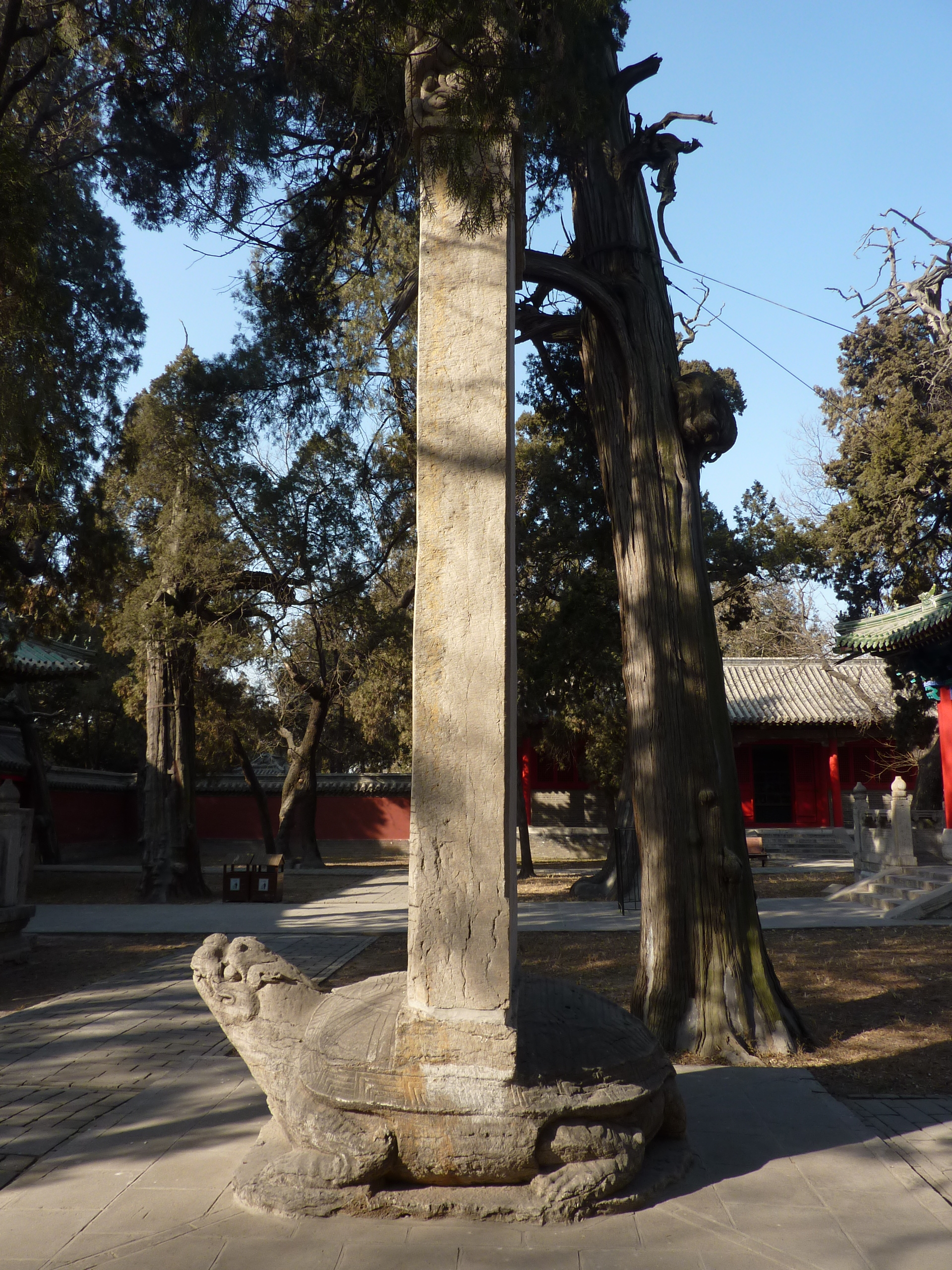
Stele recording the rebuilding of the Temple of Yan Hui in Qufu, dated to the ninth year of the Zhizheng era (1349).

Pope John XXII and Pope Benedict XII extended a network of Catholic churches across the Mongol domains from Crimea to China between 1317 and 1343. After the death of the archbishop of Khanbaliq, John of Montecorvino, in 1328, the Alan community in the capital wrote to Pope Benedict XII in 1336, with Toghon Temür's support, requesting a new metropolitan. In 1338 the pope dispatched an embassy led by Giovanni de' Marignolli, who remained in Khanbaliq for three or four years. The embassy brought Toghon Temür gifts that included fine European horses.

=== Goryeo ===
The Yuan court exerted significant influence over Goryeo throughout Toghon Temür's reign. The practice of sending Korean women to serve at the Yuan court continued, and marriage alliances reinforced political ties. The elevation of Empress Gi, herself of Korean origin, gave Goryeo unusual influence at the Yuan court.

== Retreat to the north ==
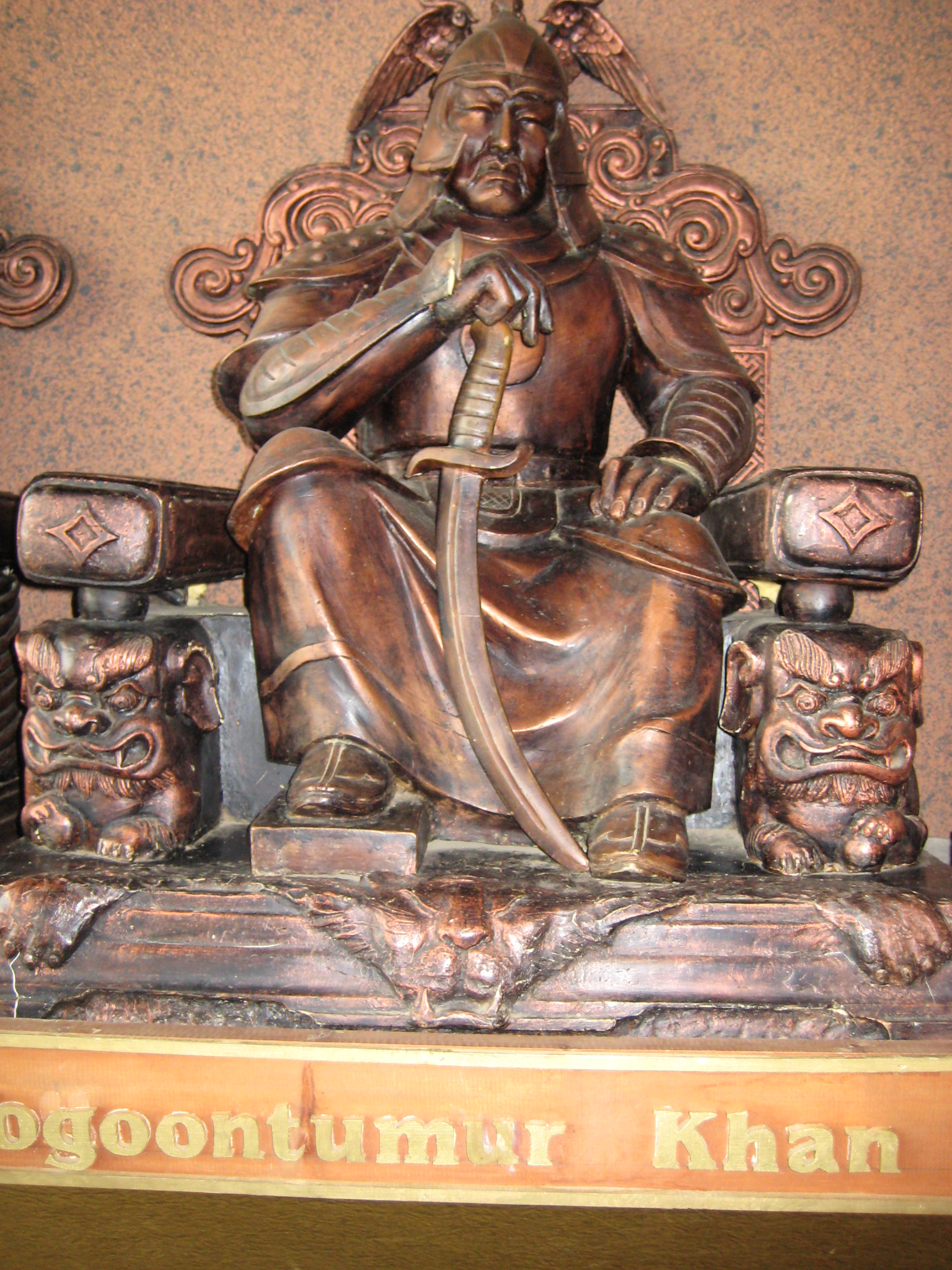
A modern statue of Toghon Temür in Mongol Castle.

After defeating the rival Chen Han dynasty, consolidating control of southern China, and founding the Ming dynasty, Zhu Yuanzhang—crowned as the Hongwu Emperor—launched a northern military campaign and defeated Yuan forces in 1368. When Köke Temür lost a series of engagements against the Ming general Xu Da and Ming troops advanced into Hebei, Toghon Temür abandoned Khanbaliq and withdrew to his summer capital at Shangdu.

In 1369, Ming forces captured Shangdu as well. Toghon Temür retreated further north to Yingchang, in present-day Inner Mongolia, where he died on 23 May 1370. His son Ayushiridara succeeded him as Biligtü Khan and subsequently withdrew the court to Karakorum.

The remnant Yuan court continued to claim the title of Emperor of China and is referred to in modern historiography as the Northern Yuan dynasty. At the time of Toghon Temür's death, the Northern Yuan still exercised influence from the Sea of Japan to the Altai Mountains, and pro-Yuan, anti-Ming forces persisted in Yunnan and Guizhou. The self-styled "Prince of Liang", Basalawarmi, maintained a Yuan resistance movement in the southwest that was not suppressed until 1381.

The Ming court considered that the Yuan had forfeited the Mandate of Heaven when it abandoned Khanbaliq and did not regard Toghon Temür after 1368, or his successor Ayushiridara, as legitimate emperors. The posthumous name Emperor Shun bestowed by the Ming carried the implication of willing submission, while the Northern Yuan's temple name Huizong asserted a more favourable view of his reign.

== Religious patronage ==
Toghon Temür patronised the Karma Kagyu school of Tibetan Buddhism, studying under successive Karmapas who served as spiritual advisors to the Yuan court.

He also invited scholars from other Tibetan Buddhist traditions to his court. The Jonang master Dölpopa Shérab Gyeltsen was asked to teach there but declined.

== Legacy ==
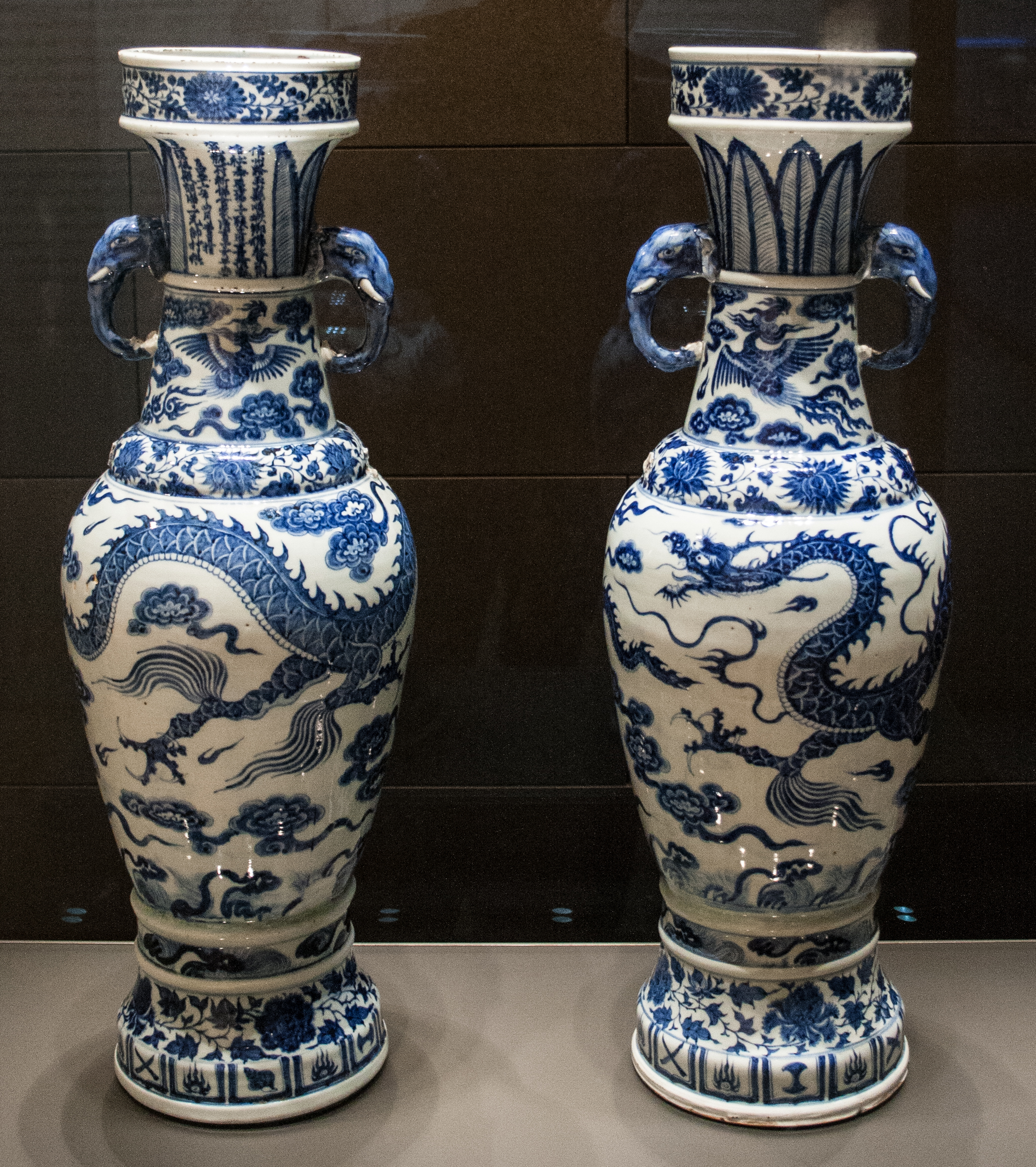
The David Vases, dated to the Zhizheng era (1351), are among the most important examples of Chinese blue and white pottery. British Museum.

Toghon Temür reigned for 35 years, making him the longest-reigning Yuan emperor after Kublai Khan. His reign saw both the collapse of Mongol rule in China and notable cultural achievements during the Zhizheng era.

The official histories of the Liao, Jin, and Song dynasties, compiled under Toqto'a during Toghon Temür's reign, remain standard references for those periods. The Zhizheng era also saw developments in Chinese ceramics; the David Vases of 1351, now in the British Museum, are among the earliest securely dated examples of Chinese blue and white pottery and are used to date related wares.

Mongolian chronicles such as the Erdeniin Tobchi include a poem known as the "Lament of Toghon Temür", in which the emperor mourns the loss of Khanbaliq.

Historians have debated how far the dynasty's fall was due to structural problems—environmental disasters, fiscal crises, ethnic tensions—and how far to Toghon Temür's own withdrawal from governance.

== Family ==
- Empress , of the Kipchak tribe (皇后 欽察氏; 1320–1335), Personal Name Danashiri (答纳失里), daughter of El Temür.
- Empress, of the Khongirad clan (皇后 弘吉剌氏; 1324–1365), Personal name Bayan Khutugh (伯颜忽都), daughter of Bolod Temür.
  - Prince Zhenjin (真金王)
  - Prince Xueshan (雪山王) (Note: In 1364, Bolad Temür attempted to depose Crown Prince Ayushiridara and install Xueshan as the new crown prince.)
- Empress Puxian Shusheng, of the Korean Haengju Gi clan. (普顯淑聖皇后 幸州奇氏; 1315–1369)
  - Biligtü Khan Ayushiridara (必里克圖汗 愛猷識理達臘; 23 January 1340 – 28 April/26 May 1378), Succeeded his father as Emperor Zhaozong of Northern Yuan (昭宗), 1st son.
  - Miscarriage at four months (1347)
- Empress, of the Khongirad clan (皇后 弘吉剌氏; 1307–1372), personal name Munashiri (木納失里)
- Pure Consort, of the Long clan (淑妃 龍氏), personal Name Ruijiao (瑞嬌) (Note: Prior to becoming a consort Lady Long was a palace servant)
- Pure Consort, of the Cheng clan (淑妃 程氏; 1333–1368), personal Name Yining (一寧) .
- Consort of the Korean Gyoha No clan (妃 交河盧氏).
- Pure Consort, of the Ge clan (淑妃 戈), personal Name Xiaoge (小娥).
- Concubine Li, of the Zhang clan (麗嬪 張氏), personal Name Ayuan/Axuan (阿元/阿玄) .
- Talented Lady, of the Ning clan (才人 凝氏), personal Name Xiang'er (香兒) . (Note: Ning Xiang'er had previously been a courtesan.)

=== Unknown ===
- Tögüs Temür, Prince of Yi (益王; 1342 – 18 November 1388)
- Shidü'er, Crown Prince (失秃兒太子), 10th son. (Note: In 1351, Shidü'er was dispatched to escort King Gongmin and his wife to Goryeo, where he married a Goryeo woman surnamed Lin.)

== See also ==
- List of Yuan emperors
- List of Mongol rulers
- List of Chinese monarchs
- List of Northern Yuan khans

== Sources ==
- Carswell, John (2000). Blue and White: Chinese Porcelain Around the World. London: British Museum Press. ISBN 978-0-7141-1491-0.
- Dardess, John W. (1973). Conquerors and Confucians: Aspects of Political Change in Late Yüan China. New York: Columbia University Press. ISBN 978-0-231-03689-4.
- Franke, Herbert; Twitchett, Denis, eds. (1994). The Cambridge History of China, Volume 6: Alien Regimes and Border States, 907–1368. Cambridge: Cambridge University Press. ISBN 978-0-521-24331-5.
- Franke, Herbert; Trauzettel, Rolf (1993) [1968]. Fischer Weltgeschichte, Band 19: Das Chinesische Kaiserreich (in German). Fischer Taschenbuch Verlag. ISBN 3-596-60019-7.
- Hwang, Kyung Moon (2010). A History of Korea. London: Palgrave Macmillan. ISBN 978-0-230-20546-8.
- Mote, Frederick W. (1999). Imperial China 900–1800. Cambridge, MA: Harvard University Press. ISBN 978-0-674-01212-7.
- Robinson, David M. (2009). Empire's Twilight: Northeast Asia Under the Mongols. Cambridge, MA: Harvard University Asia Center. ISBN 978-0-674-03608-6.
- Song Lian (1976). Yuanshi [History of Yuan] (in Chinese). Beijing: Zhonghua Shuju.
- Stearns, Cyrus (2010). The Buddha from Dölpo: A Study of the Life and Thought of the Tibetan Master Dölpopa Sherab Gyaltsen (revised and enlarged ed.). Ithaca, NY: Snow Lion Publications. ISBN 978-1-55939-343-0.

Toghon Temür House of Borjigin Born: 25 May 1320 Died: 23 May 1370
Regnal titles
Preceded by Rinchinbal Khan	Emperor of the Yuan dynasty 1333–1368	Succeeded by Himself as Emperor of the Northern Yuan
Preceded by Rinchinbal Khan	Emperor of China; 1333–1368	Succeeded by Ming dynasty: Hongwu Emperor
Preceded by Himself as Emperor of the Yuan dynasty	Emperor of the Northern Yuan; 1368–1370	Succeeded by Biligtü Khan Ayushiridara
