= Daling River =

River in northeastern China

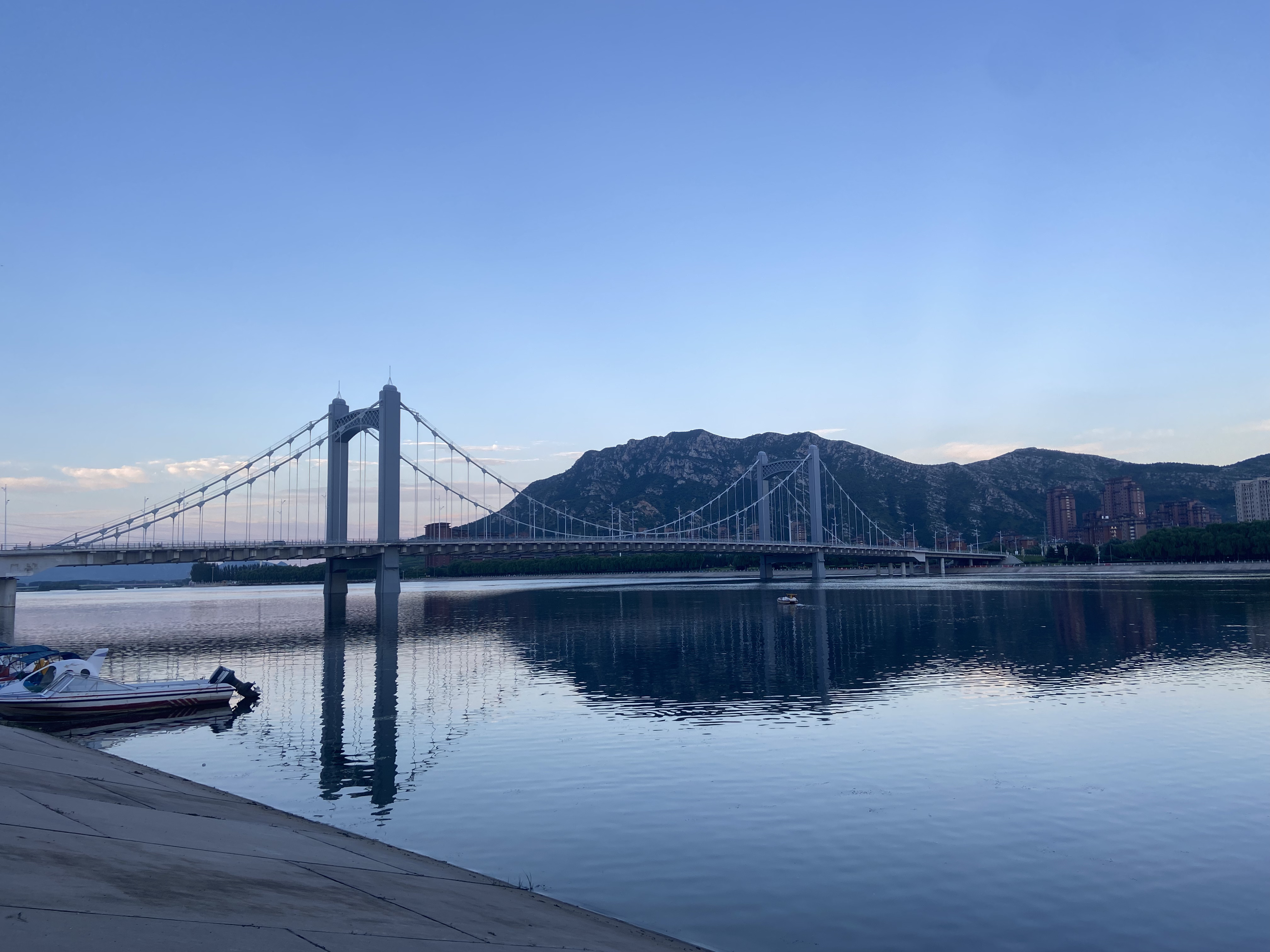
- Native name: 大凌河 (Chinese)

Location
- Country: China
- Provinces/Autonomous Regions: Liaoning, Inner Mongolia, Hebei
- Cities: Lingyuan, Chaoyang, Yixian, Linghai

Physical characteristics
- Source: Shuiquan Creek
  - location: Wukunzhangzi, Yaolugou, Jianchang, Huludao, Liaoning
  - coordinates: 40.5669°N 119.4359°E
- 2nd source: Quanzi Creek
  - location: Songyingzi, Yushulingzi, Pingquan, Chengde, Hebei
  - coordinates: 41.2596°N 119.0401°E
- Mouth: Liaodong Bay
  - location: southeast of Linghai, Liaoning
  - coordinates: 40.8584°N 121.5550°E
- Length: 435 km (270 mi)
- Basin size: 23,837 km^{2} (9,204 sq mi)

Basin features
- Tributaries
  - left: Laohushan River, Mangniu River, Xi River
- Waterbodies: Baishi Reservoir

The Daling River (Chinese: 大凌河; pinyin: Dàlíng Hé) is a river in Northeast China. With a length of 435 kilometres (270 mi), it is the main river in the arid western part of Liaoning. Its drainage basin covers 23,837 square kilometres (9,204 sq mi), 85% of which is located in Liaoning, 13% in Inner Mongolia and the remaining 2% in Hebei.

== Course ==
The Daling River has two sources. The southern source is Shuiquan Creek (水泉沟) in the village of Wukunzhangzi (吴坤杖子) in Jianchang County, Liaoning. The northern source is Quanzi Creek (泉子沟) in the village of Songyingzi (宋营子) in Pingquan, Hebei. The two source streams meet at Dachengzi, Kazuo County, Liaoning. From there the river flows northeast past the city of Chaoyang into Baishi Reservoir, where it receives Mangniu River (牤牛河) from the north. Baishi Reservoir is Liaoning's third largest reservoir with a capacity of 1.645 cubic kilometres (0.395 cu mi). The reservoir was built on the Daling River between 1995 and 2001, primarily for flood control purposes, and secondarily to supply water to nearby urban and agricultural areas. At Baishi Reservoir the river turns southeast, passing the towns of Yixian and Linghai before entering Liaodong Bay in the Bohai Sea.

== History and toponymy ==
The Neolithic Hongshan culture flourished in the Daling River basin between 4500 and 3000 BCE, as evidenced at sites such as Niuheliang and Dongshanzui. The river was known as Bailangshui (白狼水) in the Han and Tang dynasties. It became known as the Ling River (灵河) in the Liao dynasty, which was rewritten as 凌河 in the Jin. Later it acquired the modifier "great" (大) to distinguish it from the "little" Ling River (小凌河) to its southwest.
