= Josutu League =

The Josutu League (Mongolian: ǰosutu-yin čiɣulɣan, ᠵᠣᠰᠤᠲᠤ ᠶᠢᠨ ᠴᠢᠭᠤᠯᠭᠠᠨ Chinese: 卓索圖盟; pinyin: Zhuōsuǒtú Méng) was a league in southeastern Inner Mongolia during Qing rule. It occupied land that forms part of the modern-day Chinese provinces of Liaoning, Hebei, and Chifeng in China's Inner Mongolia.

The name of Josutu was named after a place in the Tumed Right (wing) Banner (not Tumed Right Banner), where Mongol princes regularly gathered together to administer inter-banner affairs.

== Divisions ==
The Josutu League consisted of two ayimag or five banners.

- Tümed ᠲᠦᠮᠡᠳ (or Eastern Tümed): two banners
  - Tümed Left Wing Banner (Mongghuljin Banner), led by descendants of Jelme
  - Tümed Right Wing Banner, led by descendants of the Chinggisid Altan Khan
- Kharachin ᠬᠠᠷᠠᠴᠢᠨ: three banners, all of which were led by descendants of Jelme
  - Kharachin Left Banner
  - Kharachin Middle Banner
  - Kharachin Right Banner

In addition, the Khalkha Banner (Tangghud-Khaklha Banner) was split from the Tümed Left Banner in 1913 under the Republic of China.

== Dissolution ==
The league was dissolved in 1933 by the Manchukuo government. Its territory is now distributed among the modern administrative regions:

- Fuxin County from the Tümed Left Banner.
- Chaoyang County from the Tümed Right Banner.
- Lingyuan (or Jianchang) County from the Kharachin Left Banner.
- Pingquan County annexed a large portion of the Kharachin Right and Middle Banners.
- Jianping County corresponds to an eastern portion of the Kharachin Right and Middle Banners.

There remain two Mongol autonomous counties in Liaoning.

- Some portion of the former Tümed Left Banner became Fuxin Mongol Autonomous County, Fuxin City.
- The remaining portion of the former Kharachin Left Banner became Kharachin Left Wing Mongol Autonomous County, Chaoyang City.

== See also ==
- Jindandao Incident
