= Kharchin Mongols =

Subgroup of the Mongols

- Territories of the Kharchin in 1911

Regions with significant populations
- China: c. 300,000
- Mongolia: 152 (2010)

Languages
- Mandarin Chinese; Kharchin dialect of Mongolian

Religion
- Tibetan Buddhism

Related ethnic groups
- Mongols, Mongols in China

The Kharchin (Mongolian: ᠬᠠᠷᠠᠴᠢᠨ, Харчин, qaračin; Chinese: 喀喇沁部), or Kharachin, is a subgroup of the Mongols residing mainly in northwestern Liaoning and Chifeng, Inner Mongolia.

The Kharchin descended from the Three Döyin (Uriyangkhan) Guards (朵顏三衛) of the Ming dynasty as well as the Yüngshiyebü Tümen established by Dayan Khan. The two groups merged around 1600 and was organized into three banners of the Josotu League by the Manchus in 1626.

The Kharchin Mongols have an agricultural lifestyle and live interspersed among the Han Chinese. The Kharchin are almost completely Chinese-speaking.

== Location and population ==
Traditionally the Kharchin lived in the Josotu League, which included three Kharchin banners and two Tümed banners. Most of Josotu is today part of Liaoning province, while a small part was included in Inner Mongolia.

- Kharchin Banner (formerly Kharchin Right Banner, Josotu League), Chifeng, Inner Mongolia. Mongol population: 132,000 (2006)
- Ningcheng County (formerly Kharchin Middle Banner, Josotu League), Chifeng, Inner Mongolia. Mongol population: 68,000 (2006)
- Kharchin Left Wing Mongolian Autonomous County (formerly Kharchin Left Banner, Josotu league), Chaoyang City, Liaoning province. Mongol population: 80,900 (2000)

There are Khalkha-Kharchin Mongols in Dorno-Gobi Province (Kharchin Örtöö was part of the province during Qing rule) and in Ulaanbaatar, Mongolia.

== History ==
The term Kharchin first appeared in the history of the Yuan dynasty. In the early 13th century, the Kipchaks and the Qanqlis surrendered to the Mongol Empire. Because they were famous for distilling khara-airag (black kumis), they were called Kharachin by the Mongols. Those Turkic peoples formed the kheshig in the Yuan dynasty after 1270. Because they formed a minority of the Mongol Yuan dynasty, they quickly assimilated with the Mongols and other groups. By 15th century the Kharchins had formed part of Yüngshiyebü tümen, inhabiting Chahar territory.

The other source of the Kharchin was the Three Döyin (Uriangkhan) Guards of the Ming dynasty. In 1389 the Ming established the Döyin Guards in modern-day Inner Mongolia. After 1448 they resettled much closer to the Ming border. Around 1600 Kharchins moving east merged with the Döyin Uriangkhan Mongols. They submitted to the Qing dynasty in 1626, and was organized into three Kharchin banners in Josogtu league, each ruled by a ruler of the Uriangkhan lineage.

In the early 20th century, Prince Gungsangnorbu of the right Kharchin expanded modern education among the Mongols. The Kharchins dominated Republic of China's Mongol bureaucracy at the time. After 1945 the People's Republic of China set up new Kharchin banners outside Inner Mongolia. In 1955 the Right Kharachin (Kharchin) banner was transferred to Inner Mongolia as Kharchin banner while their central banner was abolished. The Kharchin left banner became an autonomous country in 1957.

== Notable Kharchin Mongols ==
- Gungsangnorbu - Noyan (chieftain) of Kharchin Left Banner of Qing, first founding-director of Mongolian and Tibetan Affairs Commission (founded 1912) of the Republic of China.
- Khaisan - One of the main supporters of the Bogd Khanate of Mongolia in 1911

== See also ==
- Mongols
