= Harqin =

Harqin may refer to:

- Harqin Banner, in Inner Mongolia, China
- Harqin Left Mongol Autonomous County, in Liaoning, China
