= Jindandao incident =

1891 rebellion in China

- Location: Inner Mongolia
- Date: November – late December 1891
- Target: Mongols
- Attack type: Genocidal massacre; rebellion
- Deaths: 150,000 – 500,000
- Perpetrator: Jindandao
- Motive: Anti-Mongolianism; Han chauvinism

The Jindandao incident was a rebellion by a Han Chinese secret society called Jindandao (金丹道), who rose in revolt in Inner Mongolia in November 1891 and genocidally massacred 150,000–500,000 Mongols before being suppressed by government troops in late December. The revolt devastated Mongol communities in the southeastern borderland and forced many Mongols to take refuge in northern banners. This massacre was later dubbed an incident by Chinese officials.

== Background ==
The areas involved were the Josutu and Juu Uda Leagues of Inner Mongolia during the Manchu Qing dynasty. They were located at the southern end of the Mongol land and faced huge Han immigration. While early migrants were insignificant in number and quickly assimilated into the Mongol society, Han farmers from northern Hebei later settled en masse and outnumbered the indigenous Mongols. Large-scale agriculturalization made the Mongols unable to continue pastoralism. The Mongols became agricultural farmers and adopted the Han system of land ownership.

The presence of the large number of Han within Inner Mongolia resulted in a complex administrative system. The Han came under the jurisdiction of Han prefectures and counties, which were set up as enclaves within the Mongol lands. Mongol banners nominally retained the land ownership and ceaselessly fought over various rights over the Han settlers. As the Qing dynasty gradually lost the ability to maintain social order, the Han began to challenge the rule of the minority Mongols. Han tenants delayed or even refused land tax payment, and obstructed land surveys by Mongol authorities with force. Another main conflict between the indigenous and immigrant populations involved access to natural resources. Mongols strictly forbade the Han from cutting timbers on Mongol lands mainly for religious reasons. Violators were punishable by extrajudicial death by banner lords with acquiesce of prefecture and county official. This fueled Han hostility toward Mongols. In addition, newly arrived Han immigrants had been frequently harassed by Mongols, where "the haughty ones mounted bands of 3~5, armed with sabers, broke into Han households, demanded wine, meat and money, assaulted women and men, robbed livestock until empty".

Little is known about the Jindandao (literally meaning to Golden Elixir Way). Also known as the Red Turban (Улаан малгайтан), the Jindandao was a secret society and considered to be an offshoot of the White Lotus sect, which had previously risen in revolt at various times in China proper. Another sect involved was named Zaili. It was a religious sect popular in Northern China and had a confirmed connection with the White Lotus sect.

== Rebellion ==
The outbreak of the rebellion took place in November 1891 when rebels attacked the government office of the Aukhan Banner. They slaughtered the jasagh (head) of the banner, Prince Daghchin, who was concurrently the head of the Juu Uda League and vandalized his ancestral tomb. They quickly rampaged southward into the Ongniud banners (and Chifeng County within them), and then into the Kharachin Left Banner. Around the same time, another group of rebels captured Chaoyang County within the Tümed Right Banner, the Josutu League. They moved into the neighboring Tümed banner and two Kharachin banners while annihilating Mongol communities. They openly employed anti-Mongol and anti-dynastic slogans including "Defeat the Qing and wipe out the Hu (barbarians)" (平清掃胡) and "Kill Mongols in revenge" (仇殺蒙古).

In response, Li Hongzhang, Governor-General of Chinese Zhili Province, dispatched Ye Zhichao, Commander-in-chief of Zhili, to suppress the rebels. The Zhili forces crossed the Great Wall and marched from the south and southwest. On the eastern front, troops detached from Fengtian played a role in the encircling operation. The modernized army, communicating through telegraph, sending soldiers by the railway and armed with modern firearms, quickly crushed rebels in December. The rebel leader Yang Yuechun was executed in Tianjin.

Local Han population also suffered at the hands of the joint forces of the Qing army and vengeful Mongol tribesmen. General Ye sided with the rebels by reporting to the imperial court in Beijing that the Mongol banner army killed innocent Chinese, a claim that Prince Vangdudnamjil, the jasagh of the Kharachin Right Banner, challenged in a detailed report.

== Massacre of Mongols ==
The rebels killed tens of thousands of Mongols, burned many Tibetan Buddhist temples, and devastated Mongol communities. The imperial court tried in vain to ease ethnic tensions, paying relief money to both the Mongols and the Han and forbidding further revenge. Beijing decided to make Chinese prefecture and county authorities collect tax from Han tenants on behalf of Mongol nobles. It also decided to put Mongol-Han conflicts under the jurisdiction of Chinese authorities. This further weakened the power of Mongol banners.

The ethnic tension remained high throughout the first half of the 20th century. The situation was further worsened by Han warlords in the Republican era. In 1930s Mongol leaders pressed Manchukuo to stop and roll back the tide of Han migration. After the collapse of Manchukuo in 1945, Mongols felt somewhat relieved as the power vacuum was filled by troops from the Mongolian People's Republic and Soviet troops instead of Chinese armies.

More than one hundred thousand Mongol refugees fled northward to the pastoral areas south of the Khinggan mountains. This resulted in rapid agriculturalization of the Jirim and Juu Uda Leagues in the early 20th century.

The massacre by the Han no doubt strengthened Mongolian nationalism and movements for independence, autonomy and self-determination. Prince Gungsangnorbu, who succeeded Prince Vangdudnamjil of the Kharachin Right Banner, started just a few years later to modernize Mongol education and military training. Khaisan, who later played an important role in the Mongol independence movement, then worked for the Kharachin Right Banner and got involved in the disturbance. The impact of the massacre was not limited to Inner Mongolia. In July 1911, Bogd Gegen of the Khalkha (Outer Mongolia), who soon became the head of state of Mongolia, referred to the incident in his letter to the Russian emperor asking for support for the independence of Mongolia.

== Interpretations ==
Mongols consider the incident as an ethnic conflict between Mongols and Chinese. Given the impact on the Mongol society, Borjigin Burensain thought that the incident marked the beginning of modern Mongolian history while according to the official Chinese view, the Opium War marked the beginning of modern Chinese history. Another ethnic Mongol historian and ethnologist Yang Haiying saw the incident as a prelude of the much larger-scale persecution of Mongols in the Inner Mongolia incident by the Chinese during the Cultural Revolution.

Contemporary Western sources were only interested in Christian persecution in these areas. From this point of view, this incident can be called the Rehe Persecution (熱河敎案). The Chinese rebel sects burnt Catholic churches and Chinese converts in Jianchang County within the Kharachin Left Banner and Pingquan Prefecture within the Kharachin Right Banner. The number of casualties varies greatly from 170 to 1200. Borjigin Burensain argued that Christians were not the main target of the insurgence. The proclamations of the Jindandao made no mention of the Western religion while they were full of anti-Mongol slogans.

The interest of Sinologists lies in the characteristics of the secret societies involved, especially in their relationships with the preceding White Lotus rebellions and the subsequent Boxer Rebellion. Borjigin Burensain pointed out a Chinese bias in historical sources used. Sinologists only investigated official archives that contain reports from the Chinese armies, in addition to Western accounts on Christian persecution. Reports from Mongol banners stored at the Lifanyuan were supposedly lost during the Boxer Rebellion.

Official publications of the People's Republic of China have appraised this massacre as a "peasant uprising" against "imperialism" and "feudalism." As an "anti-foreign, anti-imperialist uprising," they emphasis on the attacks against Christians while the Mongol princes and lamas and Manchu officials are treated as feudal rulers to be overthrown. The communists have intentionally concealed the ethnic conflict dimension in the evaluation of the insurgence. As an example of such distortion, Borjigin Burensain pointed to the authoritative Brief History of the Mongol Nationality (蒙古族簡史, 1986), which altered Jindandao slogans "Defeat the Qing and Wipe out the Mongols" (平清掃胡) to "Defeat the Qing and Destroy the Westerners" (平清掃洋), and "Kill Mongols in revenge" (仇殺蒙古) to "Kill Mongol nobles in revenge" (仇殺蒙古王公). Mongols in the PRC see such an evaluation as the justification the slaughter of the Mongols. In 1990s Mongols from the Fuxin Mongol Autonomous County (the former Tümed Left Banner) protested against newspapers that glorified the Jindandao incident.
