= Yanbei Subdistrict, Chaoyang =

Yanbei Subdistrict 燕北街道
- Subdistrict
- Location in Liaoning
- Coordinates: 41°35′16″N 120°27′28″E
- Country: People's Republic of China
- Province: Liaoning
- Prefecture-level city: Chaoyang City
- District: Shuangta District
- Time zone: UTC+8 (China Standard)

Yanbei Subdistrict (Chinese: 燕北街道; pinyin: Yànběi Jiēdào) is a subdistrict in Shuangta District, Chaoyang City, Liaoning, China. As of 2020, it administers the following seven residential neighborhoods and two villages:

Neighborhoods

- Yanbei Community
- Yanhe Community (燕河社区)
- Yannan Community (燕南社区)
- Yandong Community (燕东社区)
- Yanhu Community (燕湖社区)
- Yanshan Community (燕山社区)
- Yancheng Community (燕城社区)

Villages

- Erqiyingzi Village (二其营子村)
- Sanchakou Village (三岔口村)

== See also ==
- List of township-level divisions of Liaoning
