= Chaoyang Airport =

Airport in Liaoning, China

Chaoyang Airport 朝阳机场
- IATA: CHG; ICAO: ZYCY

Summary
- Airport type: Public
- Operator: Liaoning Airport Management Group Co.
- Serves: Chaoyang, Liaoning
- Location: Shuangta District, Chaoyang
- Opened: 1933; 93 years ago
- Elevation AMSL: 173 m (568 ft)
- Coordinates: 41°32′17″N 120°26′06″E
- Website: www.lnairport.com/chaoyang

Map
- Location of airport in Liaoning

Runways
Direction	Length		Surface
Direction	m	ft	Surface
18/36	2,180	7,152	Concrete

Statistics (2021)
- Passengers: 69,554
- Aircraft movements: 81,597
- Cargo (metric tons): 9.2

Chaoyang Airport
- Simplified Chinese: 朝阳机场
- Traditional Chinese: 朝陽機場
Transcriptions
Standard Mandarin
- Hanyu Pinyin: Chāoyáng Jīchǎng

Chaoyang Airport (IATA: CHG, ICAO: ZYCY) is an airport serving the city of Chaoyang in Liaoning Province, China. Constructed in 1933, the airport served commercial flights in the 1960s, 1980s, and 1990s. The most recent expansion was completed in October 2007 and flights resumed in 2008.

== Airlines and destinations ==
Airlines	Destinations
China Eastern Airlines	Shanghai–Pudong
West Air	Nanjing

== See also ==
- List of airports in China
- List of the busiest airports in China
