= Ka La Qin Palace =

Qing dynasty mansion in Wangyefu, China

Coordinates: 41°50′16″N 118°30′04″E

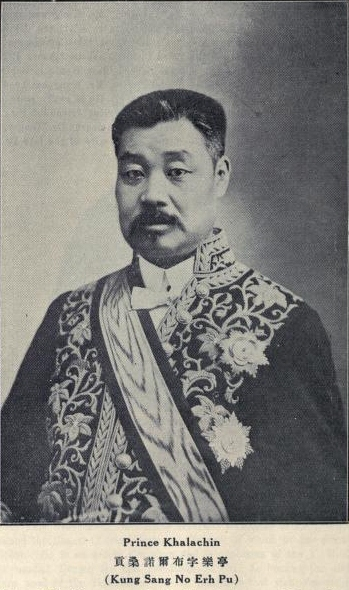
Gungsangnorbu, the last Kharchin Prince, as pictured in the 1925 edition of Who's Who in China

Ka La Qin Palace or Harqin/Kharchin Palace (Chinese: 喀喇沁王府) is a Qing dynasty mansion in Wangyefu village, Harqin Banner, south eastern Inner Mongolia, China. It lies 67 kilometres south of Chifeng and 150 kilometres north east of Chengde, location of the Imperial Mountain Resort. Currently, it houses the Wangfu museum related to the Qing times.

== History ==
The Ka La Qin princes were hereditary princes of Mongolian nobility, Khalkha Mongols and governing the Kalaqin banner, which is the current Harqin Banner. They were living nomadic before they constructed the palace as their main residence during the reign of Kangxi Emperor in 1679. Through marriage the princely family became related to the imperial Qing dynasty. The prince's descendants occupied the mansion until the 20th century. The last and twelfth prince was Gungsangnorbu, an important politician and reformer in Mongolia and China. He was born in the palace in 1872 and spent here his childhood. Within the palace grounds, there is a large bronze statue remembering him.

After World War II, the local government was stationed in the palace in 1945. Thereafter, it housed a school since 1948, which moved out in 1997. It was listed as a Major Historical and Cultural Site Protected at the National Level in 2001. The local government decided to restore the palace and turn it into a museum, which opened in 2002. It was rated AAAA Tourist Attractions of China (4A) in 2008.

== Structure ==
The complex has a size of 40,000 square metres. The lay-out is symmetrically east-west, has five courtyards and is strictly in accordance with the princely rank, stipulating size and such in Qing dynasty architecture. Within the grounds, there is also a garden and various Buddhist temples. After the construction in 1679, it was continuously expanded by the Ka La Qin princes.
