= Gungsangnorbu =

Chinese Mongolian jasagh and politician (1871–1930)

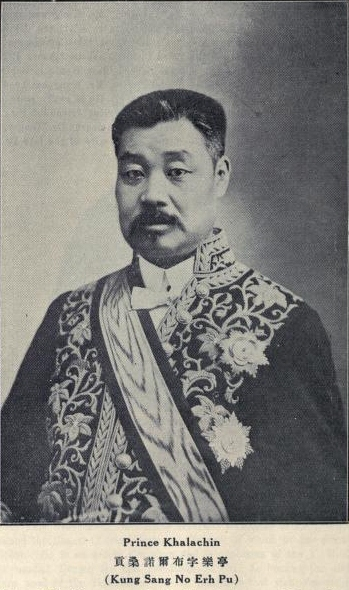
- Gongsangnorbu, as pictured in the 1925 edition of Who's Who in China

Jasagh of the Kharachin Right Banner
- In office 1898–1930
- Preceded by: Wangdut Namzil
- Succeeded by: Banner abolished

Head of the Josutu League
- In office 1918–1930

Director of the Bureau of Mongolian and Tibetan Affairs
- In office February 1923 – July 1928
- Preceded by: Tawangbulagjal
- Succeeded by: Position abolished (Yan Xishan as head of the Mongolian and Tibetan Affairs Commission)
- In office 16 October 1912 – April 1922
- Preceded by: Yao Xiguang (acting)
- Succeeded by: Xiyan

Minister for Inner Mongolia
- In office 1912–1913
- Monarch: Bogd Khan of Mongolia
- Prime Minister: Tögs-Ochiryn Namnansüren

Minister for National Minority Affairs
- In office 1 July – 12 July 1917
- Monarch: Xuantong Emperor
- Prime Minister: Zhang Xun
- Preceded by: Position restored (last: Dashou)
- Succeeded by: Position abolished

Personal details
- Born: 1871 Kharachin Right Banner, Qing Empire
- Died: 1930 (aged 58–59) Josutu League, Republic of China
- Party: Royalist Party

Chinese name
- Traditional Chinese: 貢桑諾爾布
- Simplified Chinese: 贡桑诺尔布
Transcriptions
Standard Mandarin
- Hanyu Pinyin: Gòngsāngnuò'ěrbù
- Wade–Giles: Kung Sang No Erh Pu

Gungsangnorbu (Note: Mongolian: ᠭᠦᠩᠰᠡᠩᠨᠣᠷᠪᠤ, romanized: Günsennorob; Chinese: 貢桑諾爾布) (1871 – 1930) was an Inner Mongolian jasagh and politician of the Republic of China. Some scholars describe him as a moderate, progressive moderniser caught between the influence of conservative older leaders and young radicals. Others describe him less favourably as a conservative who, despite his early activities for promoting education, would go on to become protective of his own rights and interest as a member of the nobility, and suspicious of young Mongols who had received a modern education as potential challengers to those interests.

== Names ==
His Mongolian name, which is of Tibetan origin, is transcribed into Chinese as Chinese: 貢桑諾爾布. In the (proleptic) Mongolian Cyrillic alphabet, it is written Гүнсэнноров (Günsennorov). His courtesy name was Chinese: 樂亭; pinyin: Lètíng. His art-name was Chinese: 夔庵; pinyin: Kuí'ān, and he was consequently also known as Prince Gung.

== Career ==
Gungsangnorbu was prince of Right Harqin Banner (today part of Chifeng). He was born and spent his childhood in his ancestral home, the Ka La Qin Palace. In 1902, he established what has been described as one of the first modern schools in Inner Mongolia. In 1903, he was invited to visit Japan along with a group of Manchu nobles, where he was highly impressed with the Meiji period reforms; upon his return to Inner Mongolia established a military school and a girls' school, both with Japanese teachers. Among his pupils there was Serengdongrub. Later, he sent a small number of Mongolian students to Japan, including Altanochir. In 1911, he was a Chinese legislator for the Advisory Council.

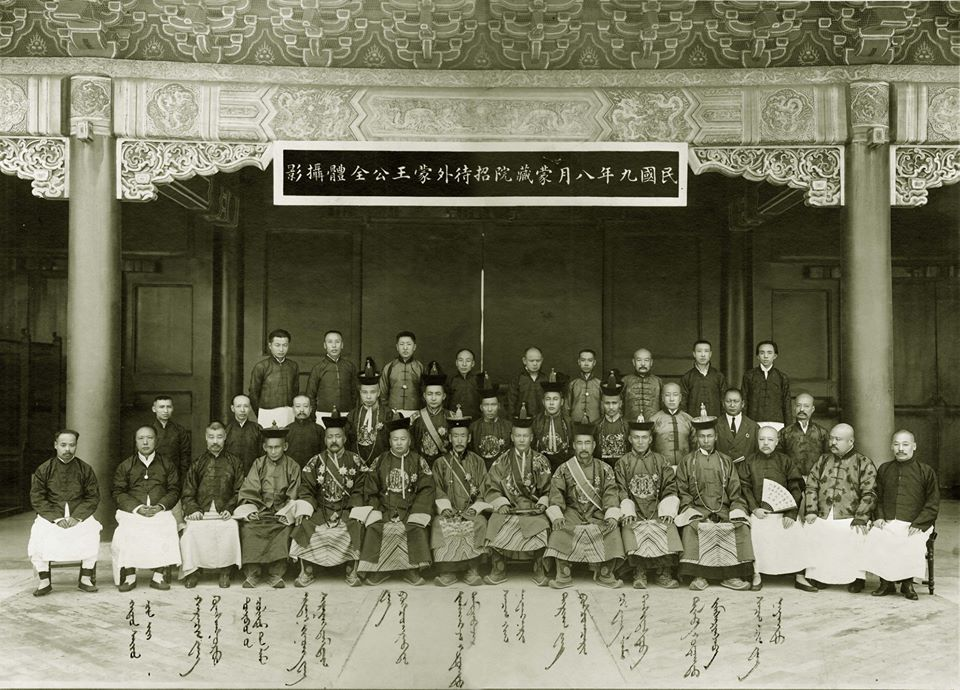
Gungsangnorbu, fourth from left

When the Xinhai Revolution broke out in 1911, Gungsangnorbu probably joined the Royalist Party and advocated the independence of Mongolia from China. As Outer Mongolia managed to gain independence with Russian support, Gungsangnorbu turned to the Japanese. He and other Inner Mongolian princes took loans and received arms from the Japanese to prepare their secession from China. The Imperial Japanese Army even dispatched a major and two captains in December 1911 to act as liaison officers for Gungsangnorbu. In the aftermath of the Xinhai Revolution, Gungsangnorbu made some attempts to form an alliance with Bogd Khan and the Khalkha Mongols in the newly independent state of Mongolia, with the Pan-Mongolist aim of annexing China's Inner Mongolian territories to an independent, Mongol-dominated Greater Mongolia. However, political fragmentation and the reality of a large Han Chinese population in his own domains thwarted this idea. He restricted himself to a more modest effort to attempt to consolidate his own power and unite the Inner Mongolian nobility. He began purchasing weapons from a group of Japanese army officers in Beijing connected to Kawashima Naniwa; however, the arms shipments were intercepted and the officers involved arrested, bringing to an end Gungsangnorbu's efforts to strengthen his own military power. Instead, he participated in Yuan Shikai's Beiyang government, taking a position as director of the Mongolian and Tibetan Affairs Commission, and overseeing the establishment of the Mongolian and Tibetan Academy in Beijing, which trained a number of cadres who would go on to achieve prominence in Inner Mongolian politics in the coming decades. He was the only Mongol prince to achieve ministerial rank in Yuan's government. He would hold that position for seventeen years, though in the chaos of the Warlord era he was not able to achieve all that he hoped for. After the 1928 Northern Expedition he resigned from his position, and died two years later.

== Bibliography ==
- Black, Cyril E.; Dupree, Louis; West, Elizabeth Endicott; Naby, Eden (1991), The Modernization of Inner Asia, M. E. Sharpe, ISBN 978-0-87332-779-4
- Boyd, James (2011), Japanese-Mongolian Relations, 1873-1945: Faith, Race and Strategy, Folkestone: Global Oriental (Brill), ISBN 978-1-906876-19-7
- Cotton, James (1989), Asian frontier nationalism: Owen Lattimore and the American policy debate, Manchester University Press, ISBN 978-0-7190-2585-3
- Hyer, Paul; Jagchid, Sechin (1983), A Mongolian living Buddha: biography of the Kanjurwa Khutughtu, SUNY Press, ISBN 978-0-87395-713-7
- Li, Narangoa; Cribb, R. B. (2003), Imperial Japan and national identities in Asia, 1895-1945, Nordic Institute of Asian Studies monograph series, Routledge, ISBN 978-0-7007-1482-7
- Lonjid, Z. (2010), 'Үхэр жилийн үймээний гэрэл ба сүүдэр' хэмээх зохиолын тухай тэмдэглэл, шүүмж — Records and reviews discussing 'Light and shadow in the Year of the Ox unrest' (PDF), School of Social Sciences, National University of Mongolia
- Who's who in China, containing the pictures and biographies of China's best known political, financial, business and professional men (3rd ed.), Shanghai: China Weekly Review, 1925, OCLC 15002534
