= Wangyefu =

Wangyefu 王爷府镇 • ᠸᠠᠩ ᠤᠨ ᠬᠣᠷᠢᠶ᠎ᠠ ᠪᠠᠯᠭᠠᠰᠤ
- Village
- Location in Inner Mongolia
- Coordinates: 41°50′16″N 118°30′04″E
- Country: China
- Autonomous Region: Inner Mongolia
- Prefecture-level city: Chifeng
- Banner: Harqin Banner

Population (2010)
  - Total: 30,000
- Time zone: UTC+8 (China Standard)

Wangyefu Town (Chinese: 王爷府镇, Mongolian: ᠸᠠᠩ ᠤᠨ ᠬᠣᠷᠢᠶ᠎ᠠ ᠪᠠᠯᠭᠠᠰᠤ) is a town in the Harqin Banner, Chifeng, Inner Mongolia Autonomous Region, China. It is 67 kilometres south of Chifeng. According to the 2010 census, the population is around 30,000.

== Monuments ==
The Ka La Qin Palace of the Ka La Qin princes was constructed in 1679. It is one of the earliest and largest palaces of Inner Mongolia. Currently, it is a museum.
