= Shuangta District =

Shuangta 双塔区
- District
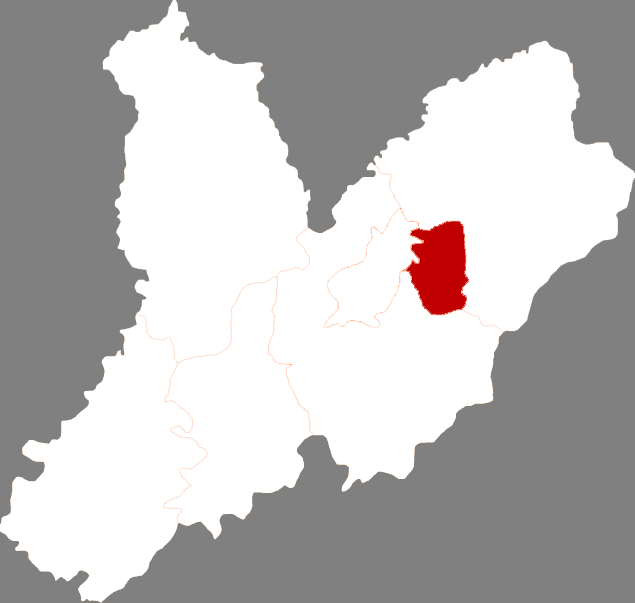
- Location in Chaoyang
- Coordinates: 41°33′58″N 120°27′14″E
- Country: China
- Province: Liaoning
- Prefecture-level city: Chaoyang
- District seat: Shuangta Subdistrict

Area
  - Total: 501.76 km^{2} (193.73 sq mi)

Population (2020 census)
  - Total: 463,543
  - Density: 923.83/km^{2} (2,392.7/sq mi)
- Time zone: UTC+8 (China Standard)
- Website: www.lnst.gov.cn

Shuangta District (simplified Chinese: 双塔区; traditional Chinese: 雙塔區; pinyin: Shuāngtǎ Qū; lit. 'Double Towers') is a district of Chaoyang City, Liaoning, China.

== Administrative divisions ==
There are 9 subdistricts, 3 towns and 1 township in the district.

- Shuangta Subdistrict (双塔街道)
- Qianjin Subdistrict Subdistrict (前进街道)
- Linghe Subdistrict (凌河街道)
- Guangming Subdistrict (光明街道)
- Lingfeng Subdistrict (凌凤街道)
- Longshan Subdistrict (龙山街道)
- Zhannan Subdistrict (站南街道)
- Hongqi Subdistrict (红旗街道)
- Yanbei Subdistrict (燕北街道)
- Taohuatu Town (桃花吐镇)
- Talagao Town (他拉皋镇)
- Sunjiawan Town (孙家湾镇)
- Changbaoyingzi Township (长宝营子乡)
