= Pingquan =

Pingquan 平泉市 Pingchuan; Pingchüan
- County-level city
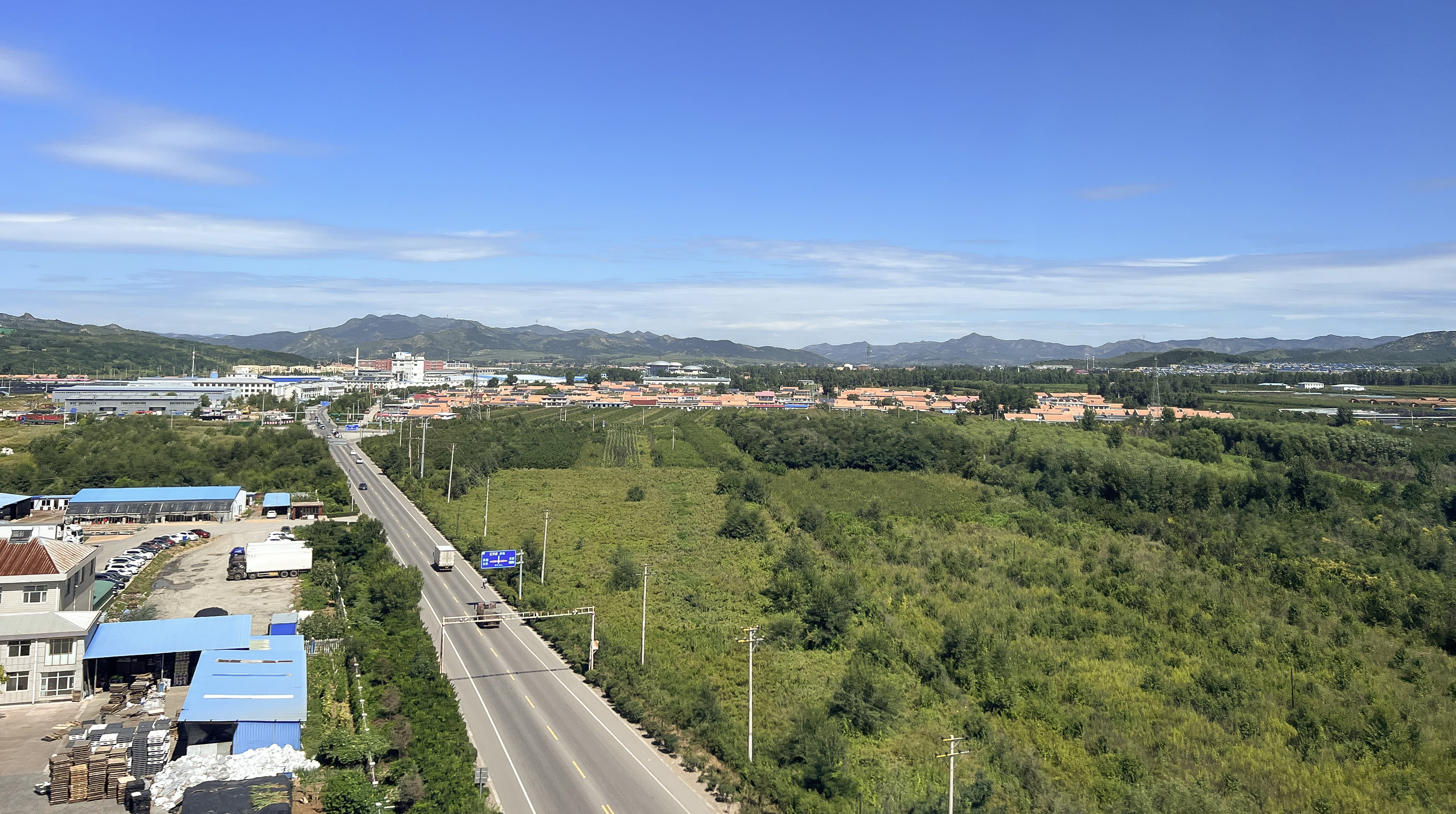

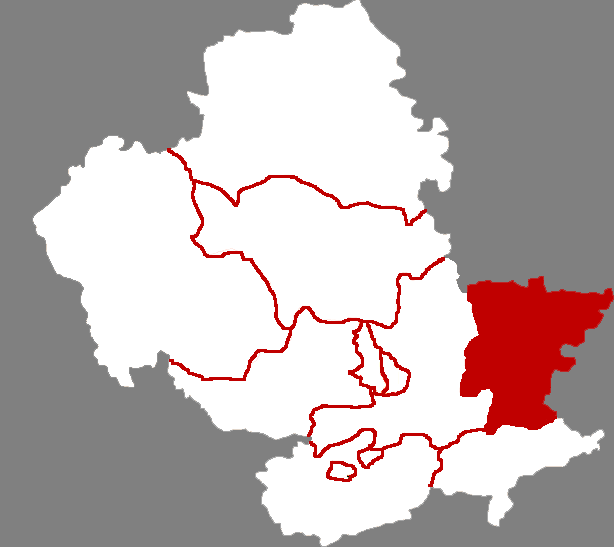
- Pingquan in Chengde

- Location of the city center in Hebei
- Coordinates: 41°01′06″N 118°42′07″E
- Country: People's Republic of China
- Province: Hebei
- Prefecture-level city: Chengde
- County seat: Pingquan (平泉镇)

Area
  - County-level city: 3,295.5 km^{2} (1,272.4 sq mi)
- Elevation: 508 m (1,667 ft)

Population (2020)
  - County-level city: 399,378
  - Density: 121.19/km^{2} (313.88/sq mi)
  - Urban: 228,261
- Time zone: UTC+8 (China Standard)
- Postal code: 067500
- Area code: 0314
- Website: http://www.pingquan.gov.cn/

Pingquan (Chinese: 平泉; pinyin: Píngquán) is a county-level city of northeastern Hebei province, China, bordering Liaoning province to the east. It has a population of 400,000 (2020 census) residing in an area of 3,297 km^{2} (1,273 sq mi). It is a centre of trade and business, and gold and silver are mined nearby.

== History ==
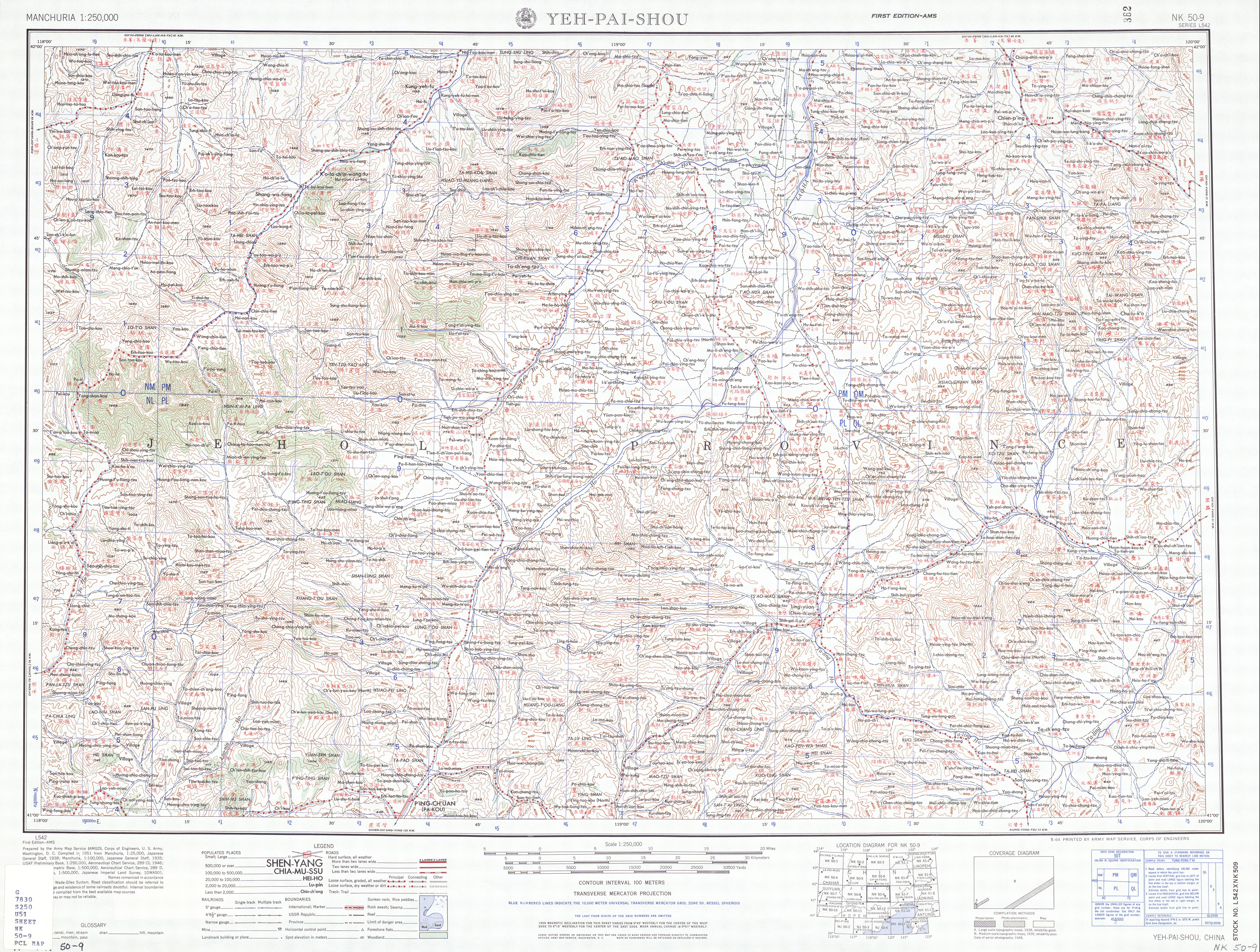
Map including Pingquan (labeled as 平泉 P'ING-CH'ÜAN (PA-KOU) 八溝) (AMS, 1951)

Pingquan was formerly called Bakou (Pakow). It absorbed Chinese colonies in the neighboring Mongol land: a large portion of the Kharachin Right Wing Banner and a large part of the Kharachin Middle Banner. Both banners belonged to the Josutu League. During the Jindandao Incident of 1891, Pingquan was assaulted by Chinese religious sects. Catholic church were burnt and Chinese converts were massacred.

== Administrative divisions ==
There are 10 towns, 4 townships, and 5 ethnic townships under the county's administration.

Towns:

- Pingquan (平泉镇)
- Huangtuliangzi (黄土梁子镇)
- Yushulinzi (榆树林子镇)
- Yangshuling (杨树岭镇)
- Qigou (七沟镇)
- Xiaosigou (小寺沟镇)
- Dangba (党坝镇)
- Wolong (卧龙镇)
- Nanwudajiazi (南五十家子镇)
- Beiwudajiazi (北五十家子镇)

Townships:

- Wangtufang Township (王土房乡)
- Taitoushan Township (台头山乡)
- Songshutai Township (松树台乡)
- Daohugou Township (道虎沟乡)
- Liuxi Manchu Ethnic Township (柳溪满族乡)
- Qijiadai Manchu Ethnic Township (七家岱满族乡)
- Pingfang Manchu and Mongol Ethnic Township (平房满族蒙古族乡)
- Maolangou Manchu and Mongol Ethnic Township (茅兰沟满族蒙古族乡)
- Guozhangzi Manchu Ethnic Township (郭杖子满族乡)

== Climate ==
Climate data for Pingquan, elevation 547 m (1,795 ft), (1991–2020 normals, extremes 1981–2010)
Month	Jan	Feb	Mar	Apr	May	Jun	Jul	Aug	Sep	Oct	Nov	Dec	Year
Record high °C (°F)	11.2 (52.2)	18.7 (65.7)	27.2 (81.0)	30.7 (87.3)	37.6 (99.7)	37.9 (100.2)	42.1 (107.8)	36.9 (98.4)	33.6 (92.5)	30.1 (86.2)	20.2 (68.4)	13.7 (56.7)	42.1 (107.8)
Mean daily maximum °C (°F)	−2.0 (28.4)	2.5 (36.5)	9.6 (49.3)	17.9 (64.2)	24.4 (75.9)	27.8 (82.0)	29.1 (84.4)	28.3 (82.9)	23.9 (75.0)	16.4 (61.5)	6.5 (43.7)	−0.7 (30.7)	15.3 (59.5)
Daily mean °C (°F)	−10.0 (14.0)	−5.8 (21.6)	1.7 (35.1)	10.3 (50.5)	17.1 (62.8)	21.1 (70.0)	23.3 (73.9)	21.8 (71.2)	16.0 (60.8)	8.1 (46.6)	−1.1 (30.0)	−8.1 (17.4)	7.9 (46.2)
Mean daily minimum °C (°F)	−16.4 (2.5)	−12.7 (9.1)	−5.6 (21.9)	2.5 (36.5)	9.4 (48.9)	14.6 (58.3)	18.0 (64.4)	16.3 (61.3)	9.4 (48.9)	1.3 (34.3)	−7.0 (19.4)	−13.9 (7.0)	1.3 (34.4)
Record low °C (°F)	−32.9 (−27.2)	−26.3 (−15.3)	−21.2 (−6.2)	−9.9 (14.2)	−1.7 (28.9)	4.9 (40.8)	9.6 (49.3)	5.7 (42.3)	−1.1 (30.0)	−11.5 (11.3)	−22.3 (−8.1)	−26.3 (−15.3)	−32.9 (−27.2)
Average precipitation mm (inches)	1.7 (0.07)	2.5 (0.10)	8.4 (0.33)	27.1 (1.07)	50.6 (1.99)	90.5 (3.56)	142.3 (5.60)	97.2 (3.83)	41.9 (1.65)	28.3 (1.11)	10.6 (0.42)	1.6 (0.06)	502.7 (19.79)
Average precipitation days (≥ 0.1 mm)	1.4	1.9	3.2	5.5	8.0	12.3	14.0	10.7	7.5	5.1	3.2	1.6	74.4
Average snowy days	3.0	3.4	3.8	1.4	0	0	0	0	0	0.9	3.6	2.9	19
Average relative humidity (%)	52	47	42	43	49	64	75	76	70	62	58	55	58
Mean monthly sunshine hours	198.7	204.0	242.2	249.9	270.9	235.3	219.4	229.4	226.2	220.8	189.6	187.4	2,673.8
Percentage possible sunshine	67	67	65	62	60	52	48	54	61	65	65	66	61
Source: China Meteorological Administration

== Education ==
Institutions of higher education include:

- Pingquan Hospital of Traditional Chinese Medicine of Chengde
- Pingquan Normal College

== Economy ==
Major local companies include:

- Pingquan Edible Fungus Company
- Pingquan Seeds Co., Ltd
- Pingquan Lihua Cement Co., Ltd
- Hebei Pingquan Changcheng Chemical Co., Ltd (the largest hydrogen fluoride manufacturer in North China)
- Pingquan Yadong The Plastics Co., Ltd
- Pingquan Grain & Oil Group Co., Ltd
- Chengde Jibei Yanshan Activated Carbon Co., Ltd
