= Chaoyang, Liaoning =

Chaoyang 朝阳市
- Prefecture-level city
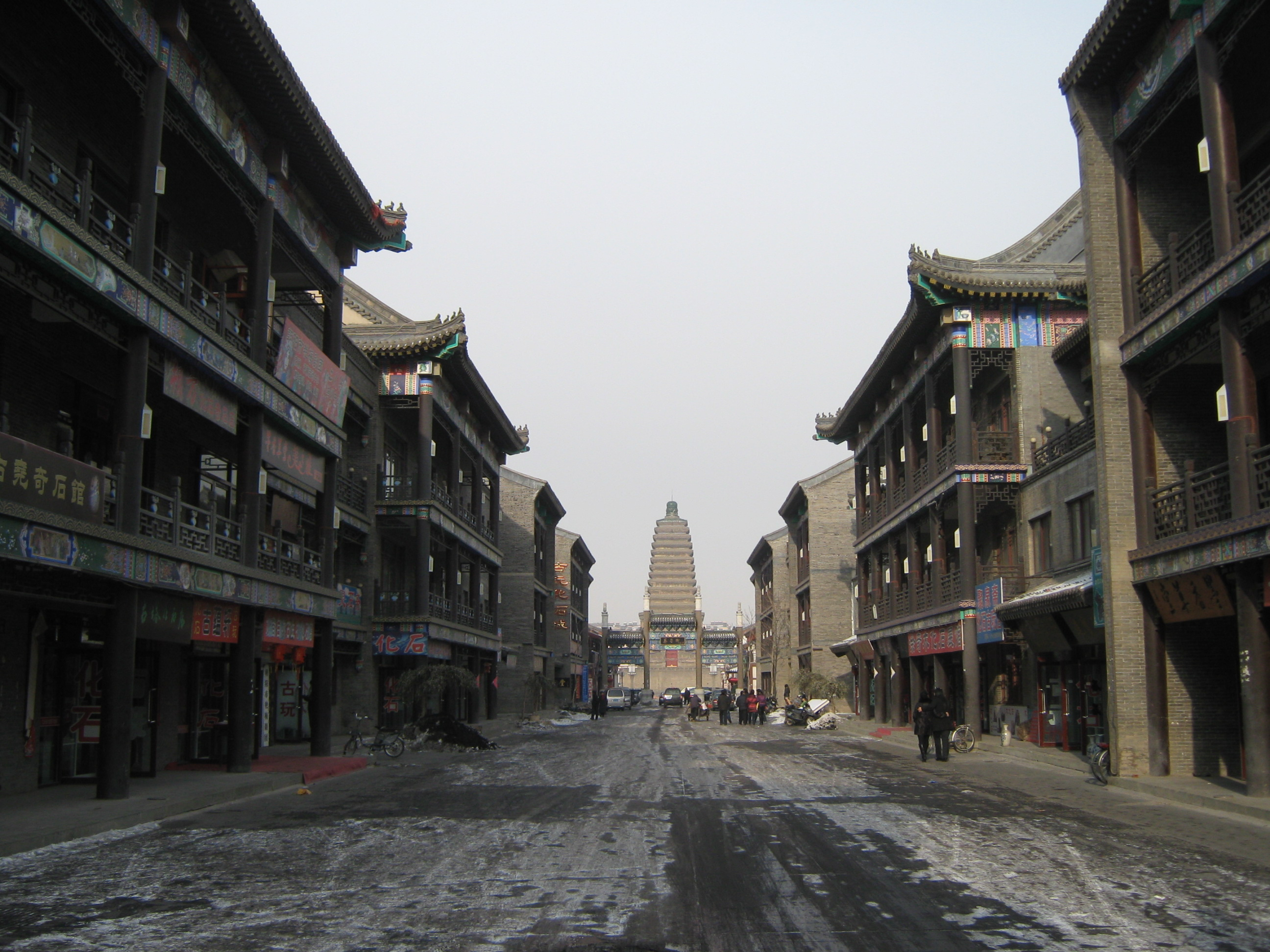
- An ancient street in Chaoyang.

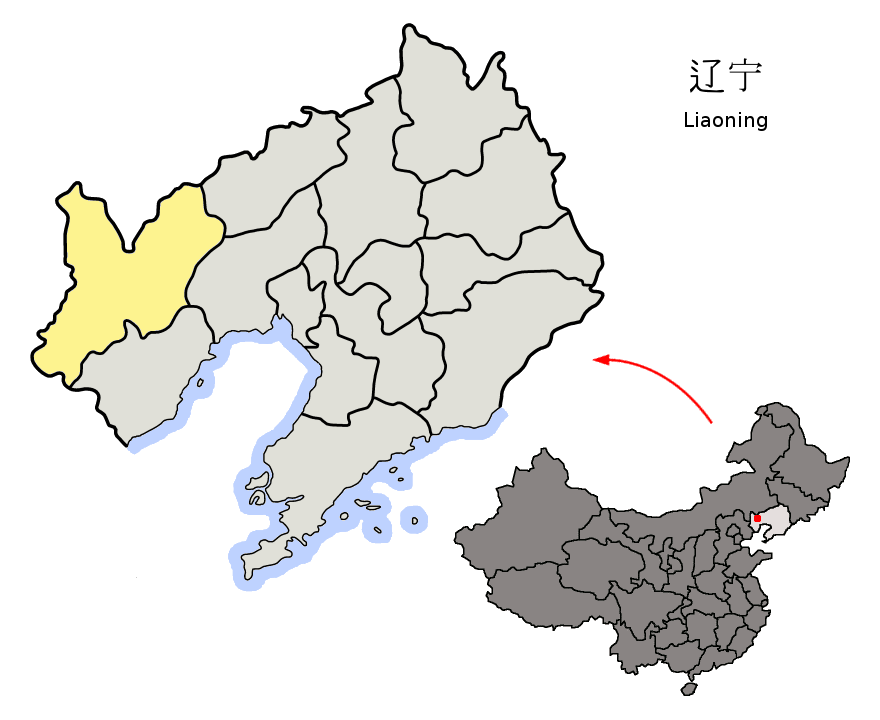
- Location of Chaoyang City jurisdiction in Liaoning

- Location of the city centre in Liaoning
- Coordinates (Chaoyang People's Park): 41°34′16″N 120°27′11″E
- Country: People's Republic of China
- Province: Liaoning
- Municipal seat: Shuangta District
- Districts and Counties: List: Shuangta District; Longcheng District; Beipiao City; Lingyuan City; Chaoyang County; Jianping County; Harqin Left Mongol Autonomous County

Government
  - CPC Chief: Chen Tiexin
  - Mayor: Zhang Tiemin

Area
  - Prefecture-level city: 19,698 km^{2} (7,605 sq mi)
  - Urban (2017): 570.00 km^{2} (220.08 sq mi)
  - Districts: 1,170.5 km^{2} (451.9 sq mi)
- Elevation: 170 m (560 ft)

Population (2010)
  - Prefecture-level city: 3,044,641
  - Density: 154.57/km^{2} (400.32/sq mi)
  - Urban (2017): 537,800
  - Districts: 639,000

GDP
  - Prefecture-level city: CN¥ 85.5 billion US$ 13.7 billion
  - Per capita: CN¥ 28,852; US$ 4,632
- Time zone: UTC+8 (China Standard)
- Postal code: 122000
- Area code: 0421
- ISO 3166 code: CN-LN-13
- Licence plate prefixes: 辽N
- Administrative division code: 211300
- Website: zgcy.gov.cn

Chaoyang, Liaoning

Chinese name
- Traditional Chinese: 朝陽
- Simplified Chinese: 朝阳
Transcriptions
Standard Mandarin
- Hanyu Pinyin: Cháoyáng

Mongolian name
- Mongolian script: ᠴᠤᠤᠶᠠᠩ

Chaoyang (Chinese: 朝阳市; pinyin: Cháoyáng) is a prefecture-level city in western Liaoning province, People's Republic of China.

With a vast land area of almost 20,000 square kilometres (7,700 sq mi), it is by area the largest prefecture-level city in Liaoning, and borders on Hebei province and the Inner Mongolia Autonomous Region to the west.

The area under Chaoyang's jurisdictional control is split up into two counties (Jianping, Chaoyang), two urban districts (Longcheng, Shuangta), two county-level cities (Beipiao, Lingyuan), and the Harqin Left Wing Mongolian Autonomous County. The total regional population is 3 million, while the urban centre where the government office is located has a population of 430,000 and forms the core of Chaoyang.

Known as China's 'fossil city', many important paleontological discoveries have been made in Chaoyang, and the Harqin region is the oldest currently known prehistoric site in northern China. Two of the most remarkable Early Cretaceous birds known to date were recovered in the vicinity of the Jiufotang Formation rocks and named Longipteryx chaoyangensis and Sapeornis chaoyangensis in reference to the city.

== Name ==
The name "Chaoyang" originates from a poem found in one of the oldest collections of Chinese poetry, the Shijing. "A wutong tree grew on a mountain. A fenghuang bird perched at the top and sang towards the morning sun" (Chaoyang's name means "morning sun" in Chinese). The eastern part of Chaoyang is home to a mountain that has been called Fenghuang Mountain since ancient times. In 1778, this mountain was connected with the poem from the Shijing and Chaoyang was given its current name.

== History ==
Chaoyang has a long and rich history. The discovery of the over five-thousand-year-old Niuheliang Hongshan Cultural Ruins in the region has drawn attention to Chaoyang as one of the birthplaces of ancient Chinese culture. The area first appears in Chinese historical records as "Liucheng County" in the Early Han period of the 3rd century B.C. In 342 AD, King of the Former Yan, Murong Huang, made Chaoyang his capital under the name Longcheng ("Dragon City"), and the city remained the capital through the Later Yan and Northern Yan periods. The center of Longcheng was located at the old town of modern Chaoyang. Since this time, Chaoyang has functioned as a center of Buddhism in Northeast China, with the construction of Longxiang temple in 345 AD forming the beginning of Buddhist culture in the Northeast.

During the Sui and Tang dynasties, Liucheng (renamed from Longcheng) was the seat of Ying Prefecture (Yingzhou, 營州). It was a prosperous multi-cultural city whose inhabitants included the Khitans, Kumo Xi, Mohe, Shiwei, Goguryeo, Göktürks and Sogdians. The Khitan general Li Guangbi of Tang dynasty, who played an instrumental role during the war against the An Lushan rebels, was a native of Liucheng. The city went into a period of decline after the An Lushan rebellion. The Liao dynasty established Ba Prefecture (霸州) at Liucheng. As its importance grew again a century later, it was renamed Xingzhong Prefecture (兴中府). The city was abandoned during the Mongol Yuan dynasty.

The Mongols seized Chaoyang and surrounding regions. When they submitted to the Manchu Qing dynasty, Chaoyang was controlled by Chinggisid princes and descendants of Jelme. Their territories became Tümed Right Wing Banner, Kharachin Left Wing Banner, Kharachin Right Wing Banner, and Kharachin Middle Banner, all of which were under Josutu League.

Although the Qing officially prohibited the Chinese from immigrating to Mongol lands, the southernmost league of Mongolia was flooded by Chinese peasants. As a result, several Chinese prefectures were created within the Mongol lands, and the Chinese came under the jurisdiction of the neighboring Chengde-fu. Chaoyang County was established in 1778, with its seat at the old town of Chaoyang.

In 1891, a Chinese secret society named Jindandao raised a rebellion, massacring tens of thousands of Mongols and forcing survivors to flee northward.

Under Manchukuo, the eastern part of Chaoyang, including the city of Chaoyang, belonged to Kin-chow Province while the western part constituted Jehol Province. The People's Republic of China incorporated Chaoyang into Liaoning Province in 1955 although ethnic Mongols wished to join Inner Mongolia. It was declared a prefecture level city in 1984.

== Geography and climate ==
Chaoyang has a rather dry, monsoon-influenced humid continental climate/semi-arid climate (Köppen climate classification: Dwa/BSk), with cold but very dry winters, and hot, humid summers; spring and autumn are relatively brief. The monthly 24-hour average temperature ranges from −9.2 °C (15.4 °F) in January to 25.0 °C (77.0 °F) in July, for an annual average of 9.52 °C (49.1 °F). A majority of the annual rainfall occurs in July and August alone. Due to the aridity, diurnal temperature variation is large, especially during spring and autumn, and averages 12.9 °C (23.2 °F) annually. With monthly percent possible sunshine ranging from 50% in July to 71% in January, the city averages 2,748 hours of bright sunshine annually.

Climate data for Chaoyang City, elevation 174 m (571 ft), (1991–2020 normals, extremes 1951–2010)
Month	Jan	Feb	Mar	Apr	May	Jun	Jul	Aug	Sep	Oct	Nov	Dec	Year
Record high °C (°F)	12.9 (55.2)	21.0 (69.8)	28.4 (83.1)	34.9 (94.8)	41.3 (106.3)	40.0 (104.0)	43.3 (109.9)	41.6 (106.9)	36.1 (97.0)	31.7 (89.1)	22.9 (73.2)	18.8 (65.8)	43.3 (109.9)
Mean daily maximum °C (°F)	−1.4 (29.5)	3.1 (37.6)	10.5 (50.9)	19.3 (66.7)	26.0 (78.8)	29.2 (84.6)	30.8 (87.4)	29.9 (85.8)	25.8 (78.4)	18.1 (64.6)	7.6 (45.7)	0.1 (32.2)	16.6 (61.9)
Daily mean °C (°F)	−8.7 (16.3)	−4.2 (24.4)	3.3 (37.9)	12.3 (54.1)	19.2 (66.6)	23.0 (73.4)	25.3 (77.5)	24.0 (75.2)	18.6 (65.5)	10.7 (51.3)	1.0 (33.8)	−6.5 (20.3)	9.8 (49.7)
Mean daily minimum °C (°F)	−14.7 (5.5)	−10.6 (12.9)	−3.3 (26.1)	5.4 (41.7)	12.4 (54.3)	17.2 (63.0)	20.5 (68.9)	18.9 (66.0)	12.2 (54.0)	4.2 (39.6)	−4.6 (23.7)	−11.9 (10.6)	3.8 (38.9)
Record low °C (°F)	−34.4 (−29.9)	−32.3 (−26.1)	−20.0 (−4.0)	−10.3 (13.5)	−1.4 (29.5)	6.9 (44.4)	11.6 (52.9)	8.5 (47.3)	−0.2 (31.6)	−9.0 (15.8)	−23.2 (−9.8)	−27.7 (−17.9)	−34.4 (−29.9)
Average precipitation mm (inches)	1.5 (0.06)	2.3 (0.09)	6.4 (0.25)	22.7 (0.89)	45.8 (1.80)	90.8 (3.57)	129.0 (5.08)	100.9 (3.97)	35.6 (1.40)	22.7 (0.89)	9.6 (0.38)	1.5 (0.06)	468.8 (18.44)
Average precipitation days (≥ 0.1 mm)	1.3	1.2	2.5	4.9	7.3	11.1	10.9	9.2	6.0	4.2	2.8	1.4	62.8
Average snowy days	2.1	2.2	2.6	0.9	0	0	0	0	0	0.6	2.8	2.3	13.5
Average relative humidity (%)	44	38	35	37	44	61	72	73	63	53	49	47	51
Mean monthly sunshine hours	191.5	195.8	231.0	236.4	261.3	225.6	219.1	238.4	238.7	224.4	182.2	175.1	2,619.5
Percentage possible sunshine	65	65	62	59	58	50	48	56	65	66	62	62	60
Source: China Meteorological Administration

== Administrative divisions ==
The prefecture is divided into 7 administrative areas. There are 2 districts, 2 subordinate cities and 3 counties of which one county is an Autonomous County for the Mongolian minority.

Map
Name	Chinese	Hanyu Pinyin	Population (2020 est.)	Area (km^{2})	Density (/km^{2})
Shuangta District	双塔区	Shuāngtǎ Qū	463,543	211	970
Longcheng District	龙城区	Lóngchéng Qū	222,065	346	359
Beipiao City	北票市	Běipiào Shì	439,998	4,583	99
Lingyuan	凌源市	Língyuán Shì	540,832	3,297	165
Chaoyang County	朝阳县	Cháoyáng Xiàn	404,460	4,216	107
Jianping County	建平县	Jiànpíng Xiàn	455,826	4,838	94
Harqin Zuoyi Mongol; Autonomous County	喀喇沁左翼 蒙古族自治县	Kālāqìn Zuǒyì; Měnggǔzú Zìzhìxiàn	346,133	2,240	154

== Economy ==
Agriculture forms the backbone of Chaoyang's economy. In addition to wheat, corn, beans, and potatoes, Chaoyang is also an important region for the growing of cotton and fruit. The city has also begun to venture into the production of shaji (sea-buckthorn berries), which have become popular in China because of their dual use as food and as medicine. Chaoyang is home to the largest man-made thicket of shaji.

Chaoyang has more than 1,600 industrial enterprises, manufacturing a wide range of products including steel, machinery, textiles, diesel engines, automobiles, and paper. Lingyuan Iron and Steel Works and the Liaoning Tyre Factory are two of the largest such enterprises.

The city is served by Chaoyang Airport.

== Fossils ==
Liaoning, and in particular Chaoyang, has received recent interest in the world of palaeontology. During the 1990s, many new fossils were discovered in this region. Some of the finds have contributed to our understanding of the origin of birds. Chaoyang's fossils are in the Jiufotang Formation. These fossils include: Liaoxipterus, a genus of ctenochasmatid pterodactyloid pterosaur from the Lower Cretaceous; Microraptor, a feathered dinosaur; and several early birds such as Longipteryx, Sapeornis, Yanornis and Jeholornis, an early bird. Insects have also been found such as Dictyoptera, a fossilised cockroach and Hymenoptera, a fossilized bee, which also date to the Lower Cretaceous period. A local trade in rare fossils has developed in the wake of the finds, with an estimated sixty vendors gathering in one area, called Ancient Street.

== Friendship cities ==
- Obihiro, Hokkaido, Japan - (2000)
- Woluwe-Saint-Pierre (Brussels), Belgium
