= Harqin Left Wing Mongolian Autonomous County =

Harqin Left Wing ᠬᠠᠷᠠᠴᠢᠨ ᠰᠢᠶᠠᠨ 喀喇沁县 Harqin, Kazuo
- Autonomous county
- ᠬᠠᠷᠠᠴᠢᠨ ᠵᠡᠭᠦᠨ ᠭᠠᠷᠤᠨ ᠮᠣᠩᠭᠣᠯ ᠦᠨᠳᠦᠰᠦᠲᠡᠨ ᠦ ᠥᠪᠡᠷᠲᠡᠭᠡᠨ ᠵᠠᠰᠠᠬᠤ ᠰᠢᠶᠠᠨ 喀喇沁左翼蒙古族自治县; Harqin Left Wing Mongolian Autonomous County
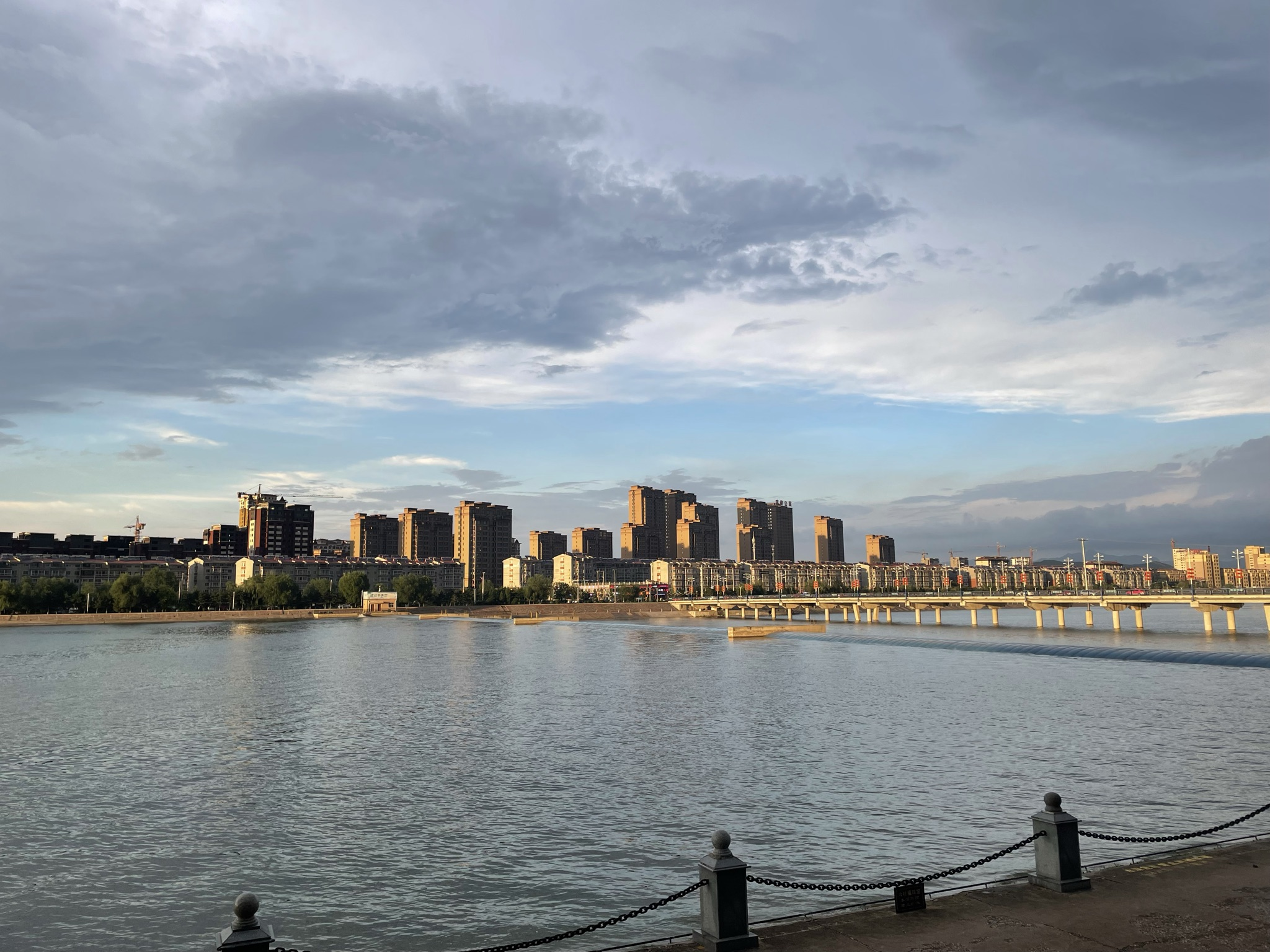

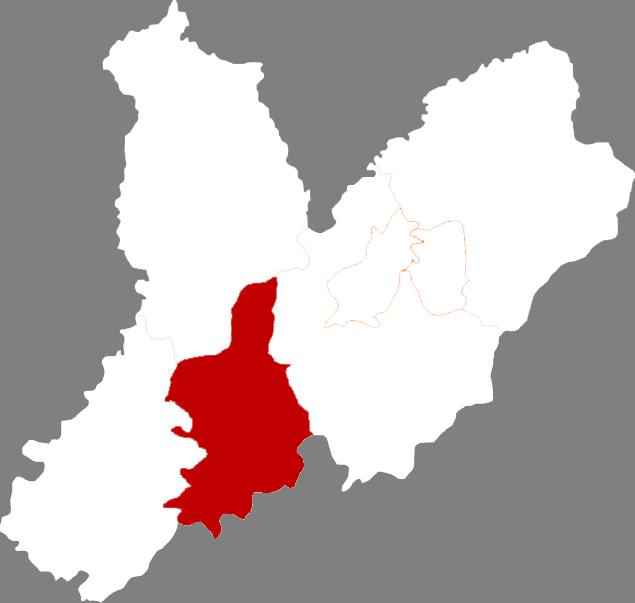
- Location in Chaoyang City

- Location in Liaoning
- Coordinates: 41°08′N 119°44′E
- Country: China
- Province: Liaoning
- Prefecture-level city: Chaoyang
- County seat: Dachengzi Subdistrict

Area
  - Total: 2,240 km^{2} (860 sq mi)
- Elevation: 327 m (1,073 ft)

Population (2020 census)
  - Total: 346,133
  - Density: 155/km^{2} (400/sq mi)
- Time zone: UTC+8 (China Standard)
- Postal code: 122300
- Website: www.kazuo.gov.cn

Harqin Left Wing Mongolian Autonomous County

Chinese name
- Simplified Chinese: 喀喇沁左翼蒙古族自治县
- Traditional Chinese: 喀喇沁左翼蒙古族自治縣
Transcriptions
Standard Mandarin
- Hanyu Pinyin: Kālǎqìn Zuǒyì Měnggǔzú Zìzhìxiàn

Harqin County
- Simplified Chinese: 喀喇沁县
- Traditional Chinese: 喀喇沁縣
Transcriptions
Standard Mandarin
- Hanyu Pinyin: Kālǎqìn Xiàn

Kazuo County
- Simplified Chinese: 喀左县
- Traditional Chinese: 喀左縣
Transcriptions
Standard Mandarin
- Hanyu Pinyin: Kāzuǒ Xiàn

Mongolian name
- Mongolian script: ᠬᠠᠷᠠᠴᠢᠨ ᠵᠡᠭᠦᠨ ᠭᠠᠷᠤᠨ ᠮᠣᠩᠭᠣᠯ ᠦᠨᠳᠦᠰᠦᠲᠡᠨ ᠦ ᠥᠪᠡᠷᠲᠡᠭᠡᠨ ᠵᠠᠰᠠᠬᠤ ᠰᠢᠶᠠᠨ

Harqin Left Wing Mongolian Autonomous County (Chinese: 喀喇沁左翼蒙古族自治县), also abbreviated as Harqin County or Kazuo County, is a Mongolian autonomous county in the west of Liaoning province, China. It is under the administration of Chaoyang City, 77 km (48 mi) to the northeast, and has a population of 346,133 (2020) residing in an area of 2,240 km^{2} (860 sq mi). Formerly known as Harqin Left Wing Banner (喀喇沁左翼旗).

== Administrative divisions ==
Harqin Left Wing is divided into 2 subdistricts, 14 towns and 5 townships.

Name	Simplified Chinese	Hanyu Pinyin	Mongolian (Hudum Script)	Mongolian (Cyrillic)	Administrative division code
Subdistricts
Dachengzi Subdistrict (Ih Hot)	大城子街道	Dàchéngzǐ Jiēdào	ᠶᠡᠬᠡ ᠬᠣᠲᠠ ᠵᠡᠭᠡᠯᠢ ᠭᠤᠳᠤᠮᠵᠢ	Их хот зээл гудамж	211324001
Lizhou Subdistrict	利州街道	Lìzhōu Jiēdào	ᠯᠢ ᠵᠧᠦ ᠵᠡᠭᠡᠯᠢ ᠭᠤᠳᠤᠮᠵᠢ	Ли жүү зээл гудамж	211324002
Towns
Nangongyingzi Town (Omon Gungiin Horoo)	南公营子镇	Nángōngyíngzǐ Zhèn	ᠡᠮᠦᠨ᠎ᠡ ᠭᠦᠩ ᠦᠨ ᠬᠣᠷᠢᠶ᠎ᠠ ᠪᠠᠯᠭᠠᠰᠤ	Өмнө хүнгийн хороо хот	211324101
Shanzuizi Town (Har Huxuu)	山嘴子镇	Shānzuǐzǐ Zhèn	ᠬᠠᠷ᠎ᠠ ᠬᠣᠰᠢᠭᠤ ᠪᠠᠯᠭᠠᠰᠤ	Хар хошуу хот	211324102
Gongyingzi Town (Gungiin Horoogin)	公营子镇	Gōngyíngzǐ Zhèn	ᠭᠦᠩ ᠦᠨ ᠬᠣᠷᠢᠶ᠎ᠠ ᠶᠢᠨ ᠪᠠᠯᠭᠠᠰᠤ	Хүнгийн хороогийн хот	211324104
Baitazi Town (Subragiin Ail)	白塔子镇	Báitǎzi Zhèn	ᠰᠤᠪᠤᠷᠭ᠎ᠠ ᠶᠢᠨ ᠠᠢᠯ ᠪᠠᠯᠭᠠᠰᠤ	Суваргын айл хот	211324105
Zhongsanjia Town	中三家镇	Zhōngsānjiā Zhèn	ᠵᠦᠩ ᠰᠠᠨ ᠵᠢᠶᠠ ᠪᠠᠯᠭᠠᠰᠤ	Жүн сан жье хот	211324106
Laoyemiao Town	老爷庙镇	Lǎoyémiào Zhèn	ᠯᠣᠤ ᠶᠧ ᠮᠢᠶᠣᠤ ᠪᠠᠯᠭᠠᠰᠤ	Луу е мяо хот	211324107
Liuguanyingzi Town (Mailstai Horoo)	六官营子镇	Liùguānyíngzǐ Zhèn	ᠮᠠᠢᠯᠠᠰᠤᠲᠠᠢ ᠬᠣᠷᠢᠶ᠎ᠠ ᠪᠠᠯᠭᠠᠰᠤ	Майлстэй хороо хот	211324108
Pingfangzi Town	平房子镇	Píngfángzǐ Zhèn	ᠫᠢᠩ ᠹᠠᠩᠽᠢ ᠪᠠᠯᠭᠠᠰᠤ	Пин фанз хот	211324109
Shi'erdebao Town (Xar Debee)	十二德堡镇	Shí'èrdébǎo Zhèn	ᠰᠢᠷ᠎ᠠ ᠳᠡᠪᠡᠭᠡ ᠪᠠᠯᠭᠠᠰᠤ	Шар дэвээ хот	211324110
Yangjiaogou Town	羊角沟镇	Yángjiǎogōu Zhèn	ᠶᠠᠩ ᠵᠢᠶᠣᠤ ᠭᠧᠦ ᠪᠠᠯᠭᠠᠰᠤ	Ян жяо гүү хот	211324111
Xinglongzhuang Town	兴隆庄镇	Xīnglóngzhuāng Zhèn	ᠰᠢᠩ ᠯᠦᠩ ᠵᠤᠸᠠᠩ ᠪᠠᠯᠭᠠᠰᠤ	Шин лүн зуван хот	211324112
Ganzhao Town (Ganjuur)	甘招镇	Gānzhāo Zhèn	ᠭᠠᠨᠵᠤᠤᠷ ᠪᠠᠯᠭᠠᠰᠤ	Ганжуур хот	211324113
Dongshao Town (Deer Onggod)	东哨镇	Dōngshào Zhèn	ᠳᠡᠭᠡᠷ᠎ᠡ ᠣᠩᠭᠣᠳ ᠰᠤᠮᠤ	Дээр онгод сум	211324114
Shuiquan Town (Terguun Bulag)	水泉镇	Shuǐquán Zhèn	ᠲᠡᠷᠢᠭᠦᠨ ᠪᠤᠯᠠᠭ ᠪᠠᠯᠭᠠᠰᠤ	Тэргүүн булаг хот	211324115
Townships
Youzhangzi Township (Albaqin Gol)	尤杖子乡	Yóuzhàngzǐ Xiāng	ᠠᠯᠪᠠᠴᠢᠨ ᠭᠣᠣᠯ ᠰᠤᠮᠤ	Албачин гол сум	211324204
Caochang Township (Belqeer)	草场乡	Cǎochǎng Xiāng	ᠪᠡᠯᠴᠢᠭᠡᠷ ᠰᠤᠮᠤ	Билчээр сум	211324207
Kunduyingzi Township (Hontoiin Ail)	坤都营子乡	Kūndūyíngzǐ Xiāng	ᠬᠥᠨᠲᠥᠢ ᠶᠢᠨ ᠠᠢᠯ ᠰᠢᠶᠠᠩ	Хөндийн айл сум	211324210
Dayingzi Township (Ih Ail)	大营子乡	Dàyíngzǐ Xiāng	ᠶᠡᠬᠡ ᠠᠢᠯ ᠰᠤᠮᠤ	Их айл сум	211324211
Wohugou Township	卧虎沟乡	Wòhǔgōu Xiāng	ᠸᠧ ᠾᠤ ᠭᠧᠦ ᠰᠤᠮᠤ	Ве ху гүү сум	211324214

== Climate ==
Climate data for Harqin Zuoyi, elevation 341 m (1,119 ft), (1991–2020 normals, extremes 1981–2010)
Month	Jan	Feb	Mar	Apr	May	Jun	Jul	Aug	Sep	Oct	Nov	Dec	Year
Record high °C (°F)	12.7 (54.9)	20.3 (68.5)	28.5 (83.3)	32.6 (90.7)	39.2 (102.6)	38.5 (101.3)	42.0 (107.6)	39.3 (102.7)	35.6 (96.1)	31.0 (87.8)	21.7 (71.1)	18.6 (65.5)	42.0 (107.6)
Mean daily maximum °C (°F)	−1.0 (30.2)	3.3 (37.9)	10.5 (50.9)	18.9 (66.0)	25.4 (77.7)	28.8 (83.8)	30.3 (86.5)	29.4 (84.9)	25.2 (77.4)	17.8 (64.0)	7.7 (45.9)	0.5 (32.9)	16.4 (61.5)
Daily mean °C (°F)	−8.9 (16.0)	−4.4 (24.1)	3.2 (37.8)	11.9 (53.4)	18.7 (65.7)	22.5 (72.5)	24.8 (76.6)	23.5 (74.3)	18.0 (64.4)	10.1 (50.2)	0.7 (33.3)	−6.7 (19.9)	9.5 (49.0)
Mean daily minimum °C (°F)	−14.9 (5.2)	−10.7 (12.7)	−3.4 (25.9)	5.0 (41.0)	11.8 (53.2)	16.7 (62.1)	20.0 (68.0)	18.4 (65.1)	11.7 (53.1)	3.7 (38.7)	−4.9 (23.2)	−12.3 (9.9)	3.4 (38.2)
Record low °C (°F)	−29.6 (−21.3)	−25.6 (−14.1)	−20.1 (−4.2)	−8.0 (17.6)	1.3 (34.3)	6.9 (44.4)	12.0 (53.6)	8.5 (47.3)	−0.5 (31.1)	−8.4 (16.9)	−21.4 (−6.5)	−25.8 (−14.4)	−29.6 (−21.3)
Average precipitation mm (inches)	1.5 (0.06)	2.4 (0.09)	6.7 (0.26)	23.9 (0.94)	46.3 (1.82)	91.2 (3.59)	139 (5.5)	104.9 (4.13)	43.1 (1.70)	24.7 (0.97)	10.1 (0.40)	1.6 (0.06)	495.4 (19.52)
Average precipitation days (≥ 0.1 mm)	1.5	1.2	2.5	4.8	7.1	11.6	11.7	9.0	6.7	4.8	2.6	1.5	65
Average snowy days	2.2	2.4	2.7	1.3	0	0	0	0	0	0.5	3.2	2.9	15.2
Average relative humidity (%)	47	40	37	40	47	62	73	74	66	57	53	51	54
Mean monthly sunshine hours	200.5	202.7	242.3	248.4	268.2	232.9	223.0	234.8	237.7	226.8	190.3	187.2	2,694.8
Percentage possible sunshine	67	67	65	62	60	52	49	56	64	67	65	66	62
Source: China Meteorological Administration

== See also ==
- Kharchin Mongols
