= Lingyuan =

Lingyuan 凌源市
- County-level city
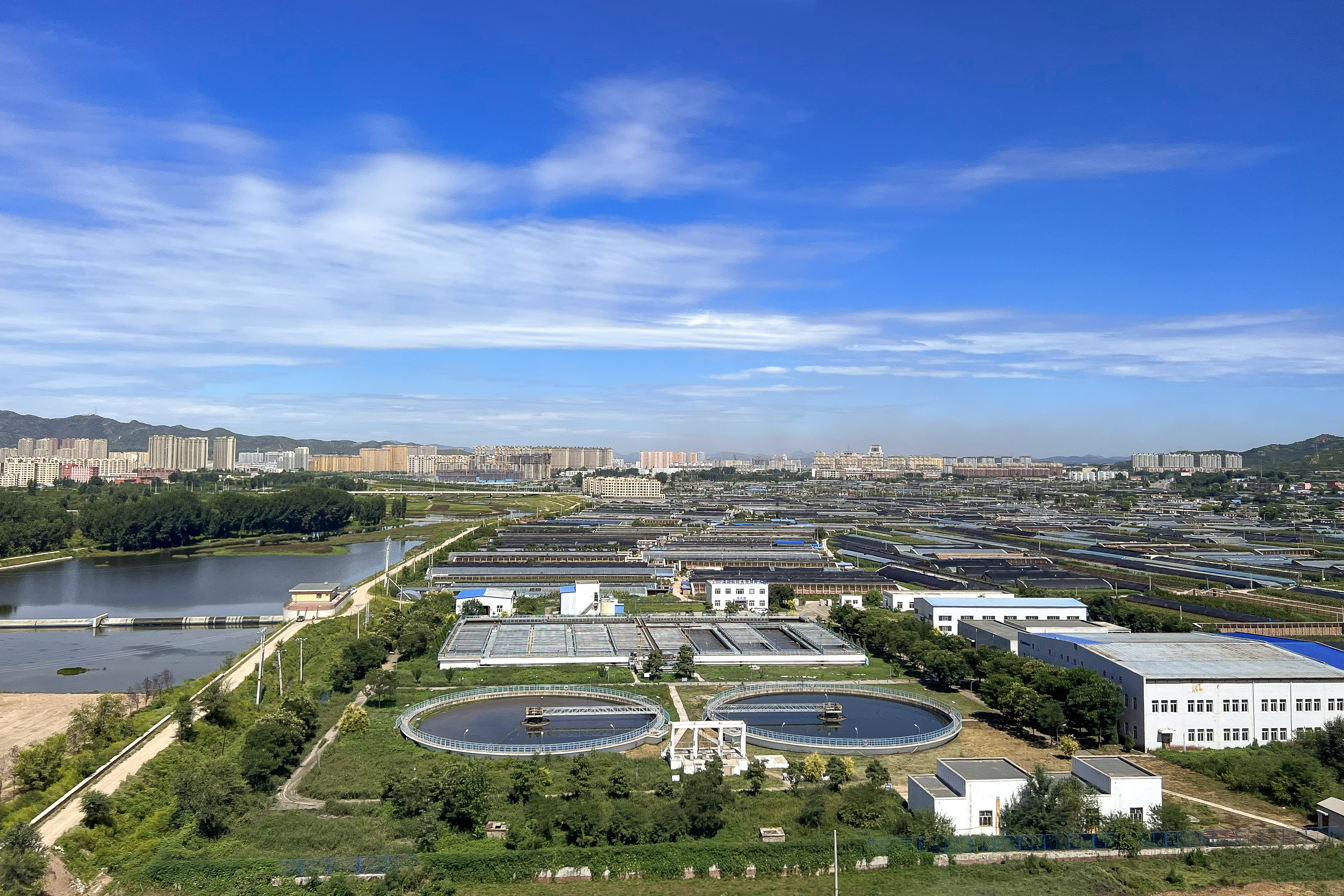

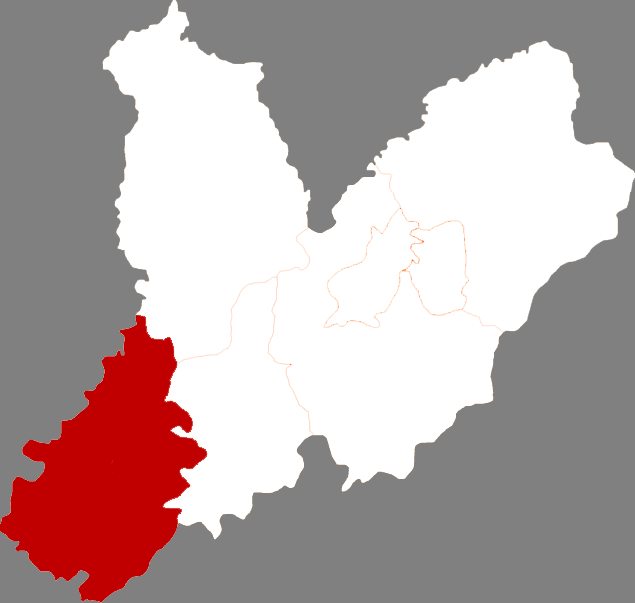
- Location of the city

- Location in Liaoning
- Coordinates: 41°15′N 119°24′E
- Country: People's Republic of China
- Province: Liaoning
- Prefecture-level city: Chaoyang

Area
  - County-level city: 3,263.0 km^{2} (1,259.9 sq mi)
  - Urban: 462.24 km^{2} (178.47 sq mi)
- Elevation: 397 m (1,302 ft)

Population (2017)
  - County-level city: 646,000
  - Density: 198/km^{2} (513/sq mi)
  - Urban: 224,000
- Time zone: UTC+8 (China Standard)

Lingyuan (Chinese: 凌源; pinyin: Língyuán) is a city in the west of Liaoning province in Northeast China, bordering Hebei province and Inner Mongolia. It is under the administration of Chaoyang City, which lies 94 kilometres (58 mi) to the east-northeast.

== Administrative Divisions ==
There are eight subdistricts, 11 towns, 10 townships, and one ethnic township under the administration of the city.

Subdistricts:

- Nanjie Subdistrict (南街街道), Beijie Subdistrict (北街街道), Chengguan Town Subdistrict (城关镇街道), Xingyuan Subdistrict (兴源街道), Dongcheng Subdistrict (东城街道), Lingbei Subdistrict (凌北街道), Hongshan Subdistrict (红山街道), Reshuitang Subdistrict (热水汤街道)

Towns:

- Wanyuandian (万元店镇), Songzhangzi (宋杖子镇), Sanshijiazi (三十家子镇), Yangzhangzi (杨杖子镇), Dao'erdeng (刀尔登镇), Songlingzi (松岭子镇), Siguanyingzi (四官营子镇), Goumenzi (沟门子镇), Xiaochengzi (小城子镇), Sihedang (四合当镇), Wulanbai (乌兰白镇)

Townships:

- Liuzhangzi Township (刘杖子乡), Sandaohezi Township (三道河子乡), Niuyingzi Township (牛营子乡), Beilu Township (北炉乡), Hekanzi Township (河坎子乡), Dawangzhangzi Township (大王杖子乡), Foyedong Township (佛爷洞乡), Wafangdian Township (瓦房店乡), Dahebei Township (大河北乡), Qianjin Township (前进乡), Sanjiazi Menggu Ethnic Township (三家子蒙古族乡)

== Climate ==
Climate data for Lingyuan, elevation 417 m (1,368 ft), (1991–2020 normals, extremes 1981–2010)
Month	Jan	Feb	Mar	Apr	May	Jun	Jul	Aug	Sep	Oct	Nov	Dec	Year
Record high °C (°F)	12.3 (54.1)	19.5 (67.1)	27.0 (80.6)	33.5 (92.3)	39.0 (102.2)	39.0 (102.2)	43.3 (109.9)	39.5 (103.1)	35.2 (95.4)	30.5 (86.9)	21.6 (70.9)	17.3 (63.1)	43.3 (109.9)
Mean daily maximum °C (°F)	−1.4 (29.5)	2.8 (37.0)	9.8 (49.6)	18.3 (64.9)	25.0 (77.0)	28.5 (83.3)	30.1 (86.2)	29.0 (84.2)	24.7 (76.5)	17.1 (62.8)	7.0 (44.6)	0.0 (32.0)	15.9 (60.6)
Daily mean °C (°F)	−9.5 (14.9)	−5.1 (22.8)	2.4 (36.3)	11.2 (52.2)	18.1 (64.6)	22.1 (71.8)	24.3 (75.7)	22.8 (73.0)	17.3 (63.1)	9.4 (48.9)	−0.2 (31.6)	−7.5 (18.5)	8.8 (47.8)
Mean daily minimum °C (°F)	−15.9 (3.4)	−11.8 (10.8)	−4.5 (23.9)	4.0 (39.2)	11.0 (51.8)	16.0 (60.8)	19.2 (66.6)	17.5 (63.5)	10.7 (51.3)	2.7 (36.9)	−6.1 (21.0)	−13.4 (7.9)	2.5 (36.4)
Record low °C (°F)	−29.5 (−21.1)	−25.2 (−13.4)	−22.1 (−7.8)	−8.4 (16.9)	0.0 (32.0)	5.4 (41.7)	11.3 (52.3)	6.8 (44.2)	−0.5 (31.1)	−10.0 (14.0)	−22.4 (−8.3)	−27.9 (−18.2)	−29.5 (−21.1)
Average precipitation mm (inches)	1.5 (0.06)	1.7 (0.07)	7.0 (0.28)	23.4 (0.92)	46.9 (1.85)	84.9 (3.34)	132.6 (5.22)	89.8 (3.54)	35.5 (1.40)	23.2 (0.91)	10.3 (0.41)	1.3 (0.05)	458.1 (18.05)
Average precipitation days (≥ 0.1 mm)	1.8	1.3	2.8	5.3	7.3	11.5	12.8	9.6	6.6	4.5	3.0	1.4	67.9
Average snowy days	2.2	2.5	3.0	1.3	0.1	0	0	0	0	0.8	3.0	2.4	15.3
Average relative humidity (%)	48	41	38	38	44	60	71	72	64	55	53	51	53
Mean monthly sunshine hours	201.6	206.4	249.9	254.7	278.8	244.2	235.7	242.1	240.2	228.5	190.1	189.2	2,761.4
Percentage possible sunshine	68	68	67	63	62	54	52	57	65	67	65	66	63
Source: China Meteorological Administration
