= Harqin Banner =

Harqin Banner 喀喇沁旗 • ᠬᠠᠷᠠᠴᠢᠨ ᠬᠣᠰᠢᠭᠤ
- Banner
- Location in Inner Mongolia Harqin (China)
- Coordinates: 41°56′N 118°42′E
- Country: China
- Autonomous region: Inner Mongolia
- Prefecture-level city: Chifeng
- Banner seat: Jinshan

Area
  - Total: 3,044 km^{2} (1,175 sq mi)
- Elevation: 729 m (2,392 ft)

Population (2020)
  - Total: 262,792
  - Density: 86.33/km^{2} (223.6/sq mi)
- Time zone: UTC+8 (China Standard)
- Website: www.klq.gov.cn

Harqin Banner

Chinese name
- Chinese: 喀喇沁旗
Transcriptions
Standard Mandarin
- Hanyu Pinyin: Kālǎqìn Qí

Mongolian name
- Mongolian Cyrillic: Харчин хошуу
- Mongolian script: ᠬᠠᠷᠠᠴᠢᠨ ᠬᠣᠰᠢᠭᠤ
Transcriptions
- SASM/GNC: Qaračin qosiɣu

Harqin Banner (Mongolian: ᠬᠠᠷᠠᠴᠢᠨ ᠬᠣᠰᠢᠭᠤ; Chinese: 喀喇沁旗) is a banner of southeastern Inner Mongolia, China. It is under the administration of Chifeng City, the downtown of which is 40 kilometres (25 mi) to the north-northeast.

== History ==
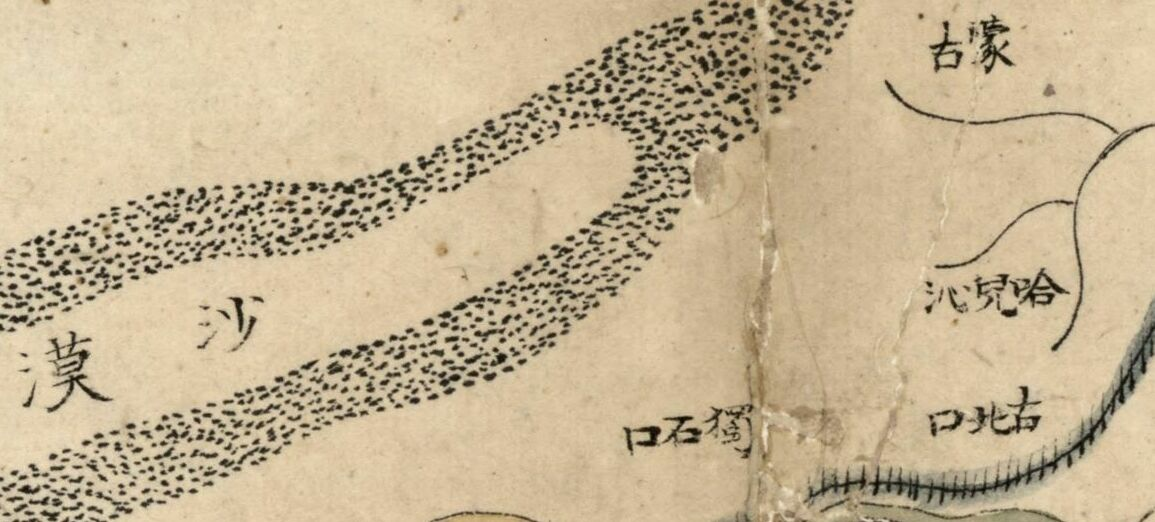
Harqin (哈兒沁, Ha'erqin) placed between the Great Wall, the Gobi Desert, and the Mongols on the general map in the 1754 Provincial Atlas of the Qing Empire

== Administrative divisions ==
Harqin Banner is made up of 2 subdistricts, 7 towns, 1 township, and 1 ethnic township.

Name	Simplified Chinese	Hanyu Pinyin	Mongolian (Hudum Script)	Mongolian (Cyrillic)	Administrative division code
Subdistricts
Hebei Subdistrict	河北街道	Héběi Jiēdào	ᠾᠧ ᠪᠧᠢ ᠵᠡᠭᠡᠯᠢ ᠭᠤᠳᠤᠮᠵᠢ	Ге бей зээл гудамж	150428404
Henan Subdistrict	河南街道	Hénán Jiēdào	ᠾᠧ ᠨᠠᠨ ᠵᠡᠭᠡᠯᠢ ᠭᠤᠳᠤᠮᠵᠢ	Ге нон зээл гудамж	150428405
Towns
Jinshan Town	锦山镇	Jǐnshān Zhèn	ᠵᠢᠨᠱᠠᠨ ᠪᠠᠯᠭᠠᠰᠤ	Зуншин балгас	150428100
Meilin Town	美林镇	Měilín Zhèn	ᠮᠡᠢᠷᠡᠨ ᠪᠠᠯᠭᠠᠰᠤ	Мэйрэн балгас	150428101
Wangyefu Town	王爷府镇	Wángyéfǔ Zhèn	ᠸᠠᠩ ᠤᠨ ᠬᠣᠷᠢᠶ᠎ᠠ ᠪᠠᠯᠭᠠᠰᠤ	Вангийн хороо балгас	150428102
Xiaoniuqun Town	小牛群镇	Xiǎoniúqún Zhèn	ᠪᠠᠭ᠎ᠠ ᠨᠡᠭᠦᠴᠡ ᠪᠠᠯᠭᠠᠰᠤ	Бага нүүц балгас	150428103
Niujiayingzi Town	牛家营子镇	Niújiāyíngzi Zhèn	ᠨᠢᠦ ᠵᠢᠶᠠ ᠶᠢᠩᠽᠢ ᠪᠠᠯᠭᠠᠰᠤ	Нүү жье енз балгас	150428104
Narin Town	乃林镇	Nǎilín Zhèn	ᠨᠠᠷᠢᠨ ᠪᠠᠯᠭᠠᠰᠤ	Нарийн балгас	150428105
Xiqiao Town	西桥镇	Xīqiáo Zhèn	ᠰᠢ ᠴᠢᠶᠣᠤ ᠪᠠᠯᠭᠠᠰᠤ	Ший чяо балгас	150428106
Township
Nantaizi Township	南台子乡	Nántáizi Xiāng	ᠨᠠᠨ ᠲᠠᠢᠰᠠ ᠰᠢᠶᠠᠩ	Нон тайз шиян	150428201
Ethnic township
Shijia Manchu Ethnic Township	十家满族乡	Shíjiā Mǎnzú Xiāng	ᠠᠷᠪᠠᠨ ᠭᠡᠷ ᠮᠠᠨᠵᠤ ᠦᠨᠳᠦᠰᠦᠲᠡᠨ ᠦ ᠰᠢᠶᠠᠩ	Арван гэр манж үндэстэний шиян	150428200

- Others:
  - Narin Fruit Tree Farm (乃林果树农场)
  - Ma'anshan Sheep Farm (马鞍山羊场)
  - Harqin Economic Development Zone (喀喇沁经济开发区)

== Climate ==
Climate data for Harqin Banner, elevation 734 m (2,408 ft), (1991–2020 normals, extremes 1981–2010)
Month	Jan	Feb	Mar	Apr	May	Jun	Jul	Aug	Sep	Oct	Nov	Dec	Year
Record high °C (°F)	12.6 (54.7)	18.7 (65.7)	25.3 (77.5)	30.4 (86.7)	37.0 (98.6)	37.9 (100.2)	39.5 (103.1)	37.6 (99.7)	34.2 (93.6)	28.4 (83.1)	20.9 (69.6)	14.8 (58.6)	39.5 (103.1)
Mean daily maximum °C (°F)	−3.0 (26.6)	1.0 (33.8)	7.8 (46.0)	16.3 (61.3)	23.1 (73.6)	26.7 (80.1)	28.8 (83.8)	27.5 (81.5)	22.9 (73.2)	15.3 (59.5)	5.4 (41.7)	−1.6 (29.1)	14.2 (57.5)
Daily mean °C (°F)	−10.5 (13.1)	−6.8 (19.8)	0.4 (32.7)	9.2 (48.6)	16.2 (61.2)	20.2 (68.4)	22.6 (72.7)	20.8 (69.4)	15.3 (59.5)	7.6 (45.7)	−1.6 (29.1)	−8.5 (16.7)	7.1 (44.7)
Mean daily minimum °C (°F)	−16.1 (3.0)	−13.0 (8.6)	−6.2 (20.8)	2.2 (36.0)	9.1 (48.4)	14.1 (57.4)	17.1 (62.8)	15.2 (59.4)	8.8 (47.8)	1.3 (34.3)	−7.1 (19.2)	−13.8 (7.2)	1.0 (33.7)
Record low °C (°F)	−29.1 (−20.4)	−27.0 (−16.6)	−22.2 (−8.0)	−11.6 (11.1)	−2.1 (28.2)	3.5 (38.3)	8.7 (47.7)	5.2 (41.4)	−2.2 (28.0)	−11.4 (11.5)	−23.3 (−9.9)	−27.3 (−17.1)	−29.1 (−20.4)
Average precipitation mm (inches)	0.9 (0.04)	2.4 (0.09)	7.6 (0.30)	19.5 (0.77)	46.7 (1.84)	88.6 (3.49)	122.2 (4.81)	75.5 (2.97)	39.3 (1.55)	25.0 (0.98)	9.4 (0.37)	1.0 (0.04)	438.1 (17.25)
Average precipitation days (≥ 0.1 mm)	1.3	1.9	3.6	5.3	8.6	13.6	14.4	10.7	8.3	4.7	2.8	1.5	76.7
Average snowy days	2.7	3.5	5.5	3.1	0.3	0	0	0	0	1.7	3.8	3.0	23.6
Average relative humidity (%)	44	40	37	37	41	58	68	69	62	52	49	46	50
Mean monthly sunshine hours	202.9	207.1	243.9	248.7	271.0	244.7	242.4	250.2	242.9	230.0	192.2	185.7	2,761.7
Percentage possible sunshine	69	69	66	62	60	54	53	59	66	68	66	66	63
Source: China Meteorological Administration

== See also ==
- Kharchin Mongols
