= Islam during the Yuan dynasty =

Islam and Muslims in Yuan dynasty China

During the Yuan dynasty in the 13th century, there was a significant increase in the population of Muslims in China. Under the Mongol Empire, east–west communication and cross-cultural transmission were largely promoted. As a result, foreigners in China were given an elevated status in the hierarchy of the new regime. The impact on China by its Muslims at this time, including the advancement of Chinese science and the designing of Dadu, is vast and largely unknown. It is estimated that the population of the Hui minority grew from 50,000 in the 9th century to 4,000,000 in the 14th century, becoming the largest non-Han ethnic group.

== History ==
=== Political status of Muslims ===
Unlike the western khanates, emperors of the Yuan dynasty did not convert to Islam. However, they elevated the status of foreigners from West Asia. Peoples such as the Muslim Persians and Arabs from West Asia worked in high-ranking posts instead of native Confucian scholars. These Islamic peoples from various regions were later referred to as the Semu people, meaning "various sorts".

At the same time the Mongols imported Muslims from West Asia to serve as administrators in China, the Mongols also sent Han and Khitans from China to serve as administrators over the Muslim population in Bukhara in Central Asia, using foreigners to curtail the power of the local peoples of both lands.

The territory of the Yuan dynasty was divided into 12 districts during the reign of Kublai (Emperor Shizu) with a governor and vice-governor each. According to the Iranian historian Rashid-al-Din Hamadani, of these 12 governors, 8 were Muslims; in the remaining districts, Muslims were vice-governors.

Over 10,000 Muslim names can be identified in Yuan historical records. The standard word for Muslims in Chinese language documents of the late Yuan period is Huihui (回回). The Muslims were overseen by a Huihui named Yeheidie'erding (Amir al-Din) who designed Qionghua island which sits in the lake of Beihai Park in central Beijing. In the fourteenth century, the total population of Muslims in China was 4,000,000.

=== New communities ===
The Yuan dynasty saw the formation of Muslim communities in North China and Yunnan. The descendants of these communities who were to merge completely with the local Han population, nevertheless sought down to our own day to preserve their own personality and were to show a marked tendency to autonomy.

=== Yuan oppression of Muslims ===
At a later period, Genghis Khan and the succeeding Yuan emperors forbade Islamic practices, such as slaughtering of animals in a “[halal]” manner and Circumcision. Genghis Khan directly referred Muslims and Jews as "slaves", demanding that they should follow the Mongol method of eating rather than the halal method. Jews were also affected, being forbidden to eat Kosher.

Among all the [subject] alien peoples only the Hui-hui say “we do not eat Mongol food”. [Cinggis Qa’an replied:] “By the aid of heaven we have pacified you; you are our slaves. Yet you do not eat our food or drink. How can this be right?” He thereupon made them eat. “If you slaughter sheep, you will be considered guilty of a crime.” He issued a regulation to that effect ... [In 1279/1280 under Qubilai] all the Muslims say: “if someone else slaughters [the animal] we do not eat”. Because the poor people are upset by this, from now on, Musuluman [Muslim] Huihui and Zhuhu [Jewish] Huihui, no matter who kills [the animal] will eat [it] and must cease slaughtering sheep themselves, and cease the rite of circumcision.

=== Rebellion ===
At the end, corruption and the persecution became so severe that Muslim generals joined the Han people in rebelling against the Yuan dynasty. The Ming founder Zhu Yuanzhang had Muslim generals like Lan Yu who rebelled against the Yuan and defeated them in combat. Some Muslim communities adopted the Chinese name which meant "barracks" and "thanks". Many Hui Muslims claim it is because the Han people played an important role in overthrowing the Yuan dynasty and it was thus named to honor those who assisted them.

Muslims in the semu class also revolted against the Yuan dynasty in the Ispah Rebellion but the rebellion was crushed and the Muslims were massacred by the Yuan loyalist commander Chen Youding.

During the Ming conquest of Yunnan, Muslim generals Mu Ying and Lan Yu led Muslim troops loyal to the Ming dynasty against Mongol and Muslim troops loyal to the Yuan dynasty.

== Muslim influences ==
=== Science ===
Muslim scientists were brought to work on calendar making and astronomy. Kublai (Emperor Shizu) brought Iranians to Beijing to construct an observatory and an institution for astronomical studies. Jamal ad-Din, a Persian astronomer, presented Kublai Khan with seven Persian astronomical instruments. The work of Islamic geographers also reached China during the Yuan dynasty and was later used in the Ming dynasty to draw the Western Regions in the Da Ming Hun Yi Tu, the oldest surviving world map from East Asia.

Muslim doctors and Arabic medical texts, particularly in anatomy, pharmacology, and ophthalmology, circulated in China during this time. The Chinese emperor, Kublai Khan, who suffered from alcoholism and gout, accorded high status to doctors. New seeds and formulas from the Middle East stimulated medical practice. The traditional Chinese study of herbs, drugs, and portions came in for renewed interest and publication. One of the medical texts introduced from the Islamic world was Avicenna's The Canon of Medicine, much of which was translated into Chinese and incorporated into the Hui Hui Yao Fang (traditional Chinese: 回回藥方; simplified Chinese: 回回药方; pinyin: Huíhui yàofāng; lit. 'Huihui Prescriptions') under the Kublai-appointed Syrian Nestorian interpreter and scientist Isa Tarjaman.

=== Warfare ===
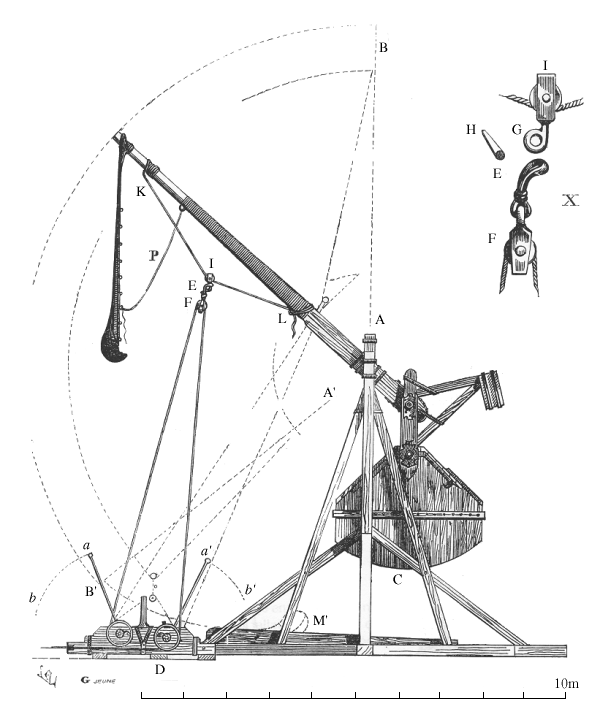
The scheme of "Muslim trebuchet" (Huihui Pao) used to breach the walls of Fancheng and Xiangyang

After entering into China proper, the Mongols adopted new artillery and military technologies. Siege engineers, Ismail and Al al-Din were brought to invent the "Muslim trebuchet" (Huihui Pao), which was utilized by Kublai during the Battle of Xiangyang.

=== Economy ===
The Yuan dynasty appointed Persian, Arab and Buddhist Uyghur administrators as taxation and finance officers. Muslims worked as grassroots-level corporation officers in China in the early Yuan period but as the Han people bought shares, most corporations acquired mixed membership, or even complete Han ownership.

It was during the Yuan dynasty that the port of Quanzhou flourished, this was in stark contrast to the port of Guangzhou that was sacked. Quanzhou was made famous on account of the accounts of the famous travelers Ibn Battuta and Marco Polo who visited the port. Today a large number of stone inscriptions can be seen at Quanzhou, such as 300 stone inscriptions on tombs, graves and mosques.

=== Designing Dadu ===
The Muslim architect Yeheidie'erding (Amir al-Din) incorporated Han architecture into the construction of Dadu (Khanbaliq), the capital of the Yuan dynasty. The construction of the walls of the city began in 1264, while the imperial palace was built from 1274 onwards. The design of Dadu followed the Confucian classic Rites of Zhou, in that the rules of “9 vertical axis, 9 horizontal axis”, “palaces in the front, markets in the rear”, “left ancestral worship, right god worship” were taken into consideration. It was broad in scale, strict in planning and execution, complete in equipment. Dadu officially became the capital of the newly established the Yuan dynasty in the 1270s, though some constructions in the city were not completed until 1293. It lasted until 1368 when Zhu Yuanzhang, the founder of the Ming dynasty and future Hongwu Emperor, sent an army towards the Yuan capital.

The last Yuan emperor fled north to Shangdu and the Ming founding emperor Zhu Yuanzhang ordered the destruction of Yuan palaces. Dadu was later renamed to Beiping by the Ming in the same year.

== Related events ==
The tales of One Thousand and One Nights (Arabian Nights), some of which were written in the thirteenth and fourteenth centuries, feature several stories set in and around China. The "Tale of Qamar al-Zaman and Budur" and "The Story of Prince Sayf al-Muluk" both include Chinese characters or settings.

After the failure of the Ispah Rebellion, a large proportion of the Semu and Muslim population left Quanzhou, leading to the decline of the international seaport and the position of a leading Islamic site in China.

== See also ==
- Islam in China
