= Islamic Astronomical Bureau =

Government agency of Yuan Dynasty

- 回回司天監

Agency overview
- Formed: 1271
- Dissolved: 1656
- Parent department: Office for Confidential Records and Books

Islamic Astronomical Bureau
- Traditional Chinese: 回回司天監
Transcriptions
Standard Mandarin
- Hanyu Pinyin: huí huí sī tiān jiān

The Islamic Astronomical Bureau was a government agency of Imperial China established in 1271 during the reign of Yuan Emperor Kublai Khan. The bureau was founded in Beijing by the Persian astronomer Jamal ad-Din Bukhari, who originally hailed from Bukhara, and existed alongside the traditional Chinese Astronomical Bureau. Both agencies were subordinate to the Office for Confidential Records and Books. The organization maintained an observatory and a staff of around 40 scholars and administrators, many of whom were Persians and Arabs, and operated through the early stages of the Qing Dynasty, finally ceasing to exist in 1656. Though it existed for nearly four centuries, few records of the bureau remain. Overall, despite its value to the government and significance in the history of Islamic-Chinese cultural exchange in Imperial China, the activity of the Islamic Astronomical Bureau didn't have a strong impact on the procedures and processes of Chinese astronomy.
