= Yeheidie'erding =

Chinese Muslim architect (died 1312)

Yeheidie'erding (Chinese: 也黑迭兒丁; pinyin: Yěhēidié'érdīng, ? – 1312), also known as Amir al-Din (Arabic: أمير الدين, Amīr al-Dīn), was a Muslim architect who helped design and led the construction of the capital of the Yuan dynasty, Khanbaliq, located in present-day Beijing, the current capital of the People's Republic of China. According to Cary Y. Liu interpretation of the Ma-ho-ma-sha Stele inscription, either Amir al-Din's ancestors came from the Western Regions, although originating from Arabia, or that he directly came from Arabia.

== Construction of Khanbaliq ==
Yeheidie'erding learned from Han architecture. In 1264, in preparation to establish the Yuan dynasty, Kublai Khan decided to rebuild the city which was then known as Zhongdu (中都, "central capital", pinyin: Zhōngdū) as his new capital. Liu Bingzhong was the planner and the original architect and was appointed as the supervisor of its construction, while Yeheidie'erding help designed and led the construction. The construction of the walls of the city began in the same year, while the imperial palace was built from 1274 onwards. The design of the city followed the Confucianism classic Zhouli (周禮, "rites of Zhou"), in that the rules of “9 vertical axis, 9 horizontal axis”, “palaces in the front, markets in the rear”, “left ancestral worship, right god worship” were taken into consideration. It was broad in scale, strict in planning and execution, complete in equipment.

After the establishment of the Yuan dynasty in 1271, Kublai Khan renamed the city from Zhongdu to Khanbaliq (大都, "great capital", pinyin: Dàdū) in 1272, and it officially became the capital of the Yuan dynasty, though some constructions in the city were not completed until 1293. It would last until 1368 when Zhu Yuanzhang, the founder of the Ming dynasty and future Hongwu Emperor, made his imperial ambitions known by sending an army toward the Yuan capital. The last Yuan emperor fled north to Shangdu and Zhu declared the founding of the Ming dynasty after razing the Yuan palaces in Khanbaliq to the ground, and the city was renamed Beiping (北平, pinyin: Běipíng) by the Ming dynasty in the same year. After the enthronement of the Yongle Emperor, the third Ming emperor, the city was renamed to Beijing (北京, pinyin: Běijīng) and became the capital of the Ming dynasty.

== See also ==
- History of Beijing
