= Ismail (mangonel expert) =

Ismail (Arabic: إسماعيل; Chinese: 亦思馬因; pinyin: Yisimayin; Wade–Giles: I-ssŭ-ma-yin; died 1330) was a Muslim Iraqi counterweight mangonel expert who served the army of the Yuan dynasty in the conquest of the Southern Song dynasty.

In 1271, Kublai Khan dispatched envoys to obtain persons skilled in the management of mangonels [trebuchets] from his kinsman Abaqa, the Ilkhan in Persia. The latter sent Al al-Din and Ismail, together with their families, by post route to Hangzhou, where they began by building large mangonels which they erected in front of the city gates. In 1273 he served at the Siege of Xiangyang. He surveyed the approaches, and planted a mangonel at the southeast corner. Its weight was 150 catties (over 200 pounds; 91 kg) and when the machinery was discharged, the noise was said to shake heaven and earth. It broke down all before it, and pierced the ground to a depth of seven feet (2.1 m).

Yisimayin died in 1330 and was succeeded by his son Yakoob.

== Sources ==
This article incorporates material from Herbert Giles's A Chinese Biographical Dictionary (London: Arthur Probsthain, 1898), which is now in the public domain.
