= Jamal ad-Din Bukhari =

Persian astrologer in the court of Kublai Khan

Chinese name
- Traditional Chinese: 扎馬魯丁
Transcriptions
Standard Mandarin
- Hanyu Pinyin: Zhámălúdīng

Jamal ad-Din Muḥammad ibn Ṭāhir ibn Muḥammad al‐Zaydī al‐Bukhārī (variously transcribed Jamal ud-Din, Jamal al-Din (lit. Beauty of Faith), etc., Chinese name Zhamaluding) was a 13th-century Persian astronomer. Originally from Bukhara, he entered the service of Kublai Khan around the 1250s to set up the Islamic Astronomical Bureau in the new capital of Beijing, to operate in parallel with the traditional Chinese bureau. Kublai Khan thus maintained the bureaucratic structure, but allowed Chinese observations and predictions to be checked by respected Muslim scholars.

He is credited with having taken seven astronomical instruments to Kublai Khan, as a present from Hulagu Khan including a Persian astrolabe, a globe and an armillary sphere, in 1267. This is the earliest known reference to a spherical terrestrial globe of the Earth in Chinese astronomy.

He is associated with a zij in Persian which has been lost but was translated into Chinese in 1383 by Ma‐shayihei with the title Huihuilifa (Islamic calendar). This contained Ptolemaic tables based on new values and adjusted to Beijing and has been reconstructed in recent years.

In general, the activity of the Islamic Astronomical Bureau didn't make much difference to Chinese astronomy. However Guo Shoujing did evidently gain the idea of the torquetum from him (which he didn't bring), and produced a simplified version which omitted ecliptic coordinates which were not used in China.

In 1286 he carried out a large-scale survey of the Yuan empire which was produced in 755 volumes as the Dayitongzh. All but the introduction of this has been lost.

== See also ==
- Islam in China
