= Al al-Din =

Persian Muslim trebuchet expert in the army of Kublai Khan

Chinese name
- Traditional Chinese: 阿老瓦丁
Transcriptions
Standard Mandarin
- Hanyu Pinyin: Ālǎowǎdīng

Al al-Din (Chinese: 阿老瓦丁; pinyin: Ālǎowǎdīng; Wade–Giles: A-lao-wa-ting, d. 1312, was a Muslim Persian counterweight mangonel (or counterweight trebuchet) expert who served in Kublai Khan’s army in the conquest of the Southern Song dynasty.

In 1271 Kublai Khan dispatched envoys to obtain persons skilled in the management of mangonels (trebuchets) from his kinsman Abaqa, the Ilkhan in Persia. The latter sent Al al-Din and Ismail, together with their families, by post route to Hangzhou, where they began by building large mangonels which they erected in front of the city gates. Al al-Din was subsequently attached to the staff of the general Alihaya, with whom he crossed the Yangtze River, being present at the capture of many towns. He died in 1312, loaded with honors, and was succeeded in his dignities by his son Mahasha (Chinese: 馬哈沙).

He is often referred to as the founder of the Mukri Kurdish tribe as during the rule of the Turkmens (ninth century AH) and at the beginning of the Darbas or Daryas region liberation from the control of one of the Turkmen tribes, he became the owner of that region. Later Him, Dei Barik, and Akhtachi annexed the Timurid and Selduz tribes to their possessions. Gradually, he formed a strong and powerful government and named his government and tribes "Mukri" and ruled for a long time without a war. Akhtachi, or Akhtasi, and Timur, the Khans of Khans, were the Mongol rulers who once ruled over the emirate of Mukriyan.
