= List of empresses consort of the Yuan dynasty =

The empresses of the Yuan dynasty of China were mainly of Mongol ethnicity, with the exception of Empress Gi who was previously a Kongnyo (Chinese: 貢女; lit. 'tribute women') from Goryeo. Empress Gwon who also came from Goryeo later became the empress consort of Biligtü Khan Ayushiridara of Northern Yuan dynasty.

== List ==
- 1260–1281: Chabi (察必), empress to Kublai Khan (Emperor Shizu of Yuan)
- 1283–1294: Nambui (南必), second empress to Kublai Khan (Emperor Shizu of Yuan)
- 1295–1299: Shirindari (失怜答里), empress to Temür Khan (Emperor Chengzong of Yuan)
- 1295–1307: Bulugan (卜魯罕), second empress to Temür Khan (Emperor Chengzong of Yuan)
- 1310–1311: Zhenge (真哥), empress to Külüg Khan (Emperor Wuzong of Yuan)
- 1313–1320: Radnashiri (阿納失失里), empress to Ayurbarwada Buyantu Khan (Emperor Renzong of Yuan)
- 1321–1323: Sugabala (速哥八剌), empress to Gegeen Khan (Emperor Yingzong of Yuan)
- 1324–1328: Babukhan (八不罕), empress to Yesün Temür (Taiding Emperor of Yuan)
- 1328–1329: Budashiri (卜答失里), empress to Jayaatu Khan Tugh Temür (Emperor Wenzong of Yuan, first time)
- 1329–1329: Babusha (八不沙), empress to Khutughtu Khan Kusala (Emperor Mingzong of Yuan)
- 1329–1332: Budashiri (卜答失里), empress to Jayaatu Khan Tugh Temür (Emperor Wenzong of Yuan, second time)
- 1332–1332: Daliyetemishi (答里也忒迷失), empress to Rinchinbal Khan (Emperor Ningzong of Yuan)
- 1333–1335: Danashri (答納失里), empress to Toghon Temür (Emperor Huizong of Yuan)
- 1337–1365: Bayan Khutugh (伯顏忽都), empress to Toghon Temür (Emperor Huizong of Yuan)
- 1365–1370: Empress Gi (奇皇后), empress to Toghon Temür (Emperor Huizong of Yuan)

Empresses who were granted their titles posthumously:

- 1300: Kökejin, mother of Temür Khan (Emperor Chengzong of Yuan)
- 1329: Empress Wenxianzhaosheng, mother of Jayaatu Khan (Emperor Wenzong of Yuan)
- 1336: Mailaiti, mother of Toghon Temür (Emperor Huizong of Yuan)

== Gallery ==
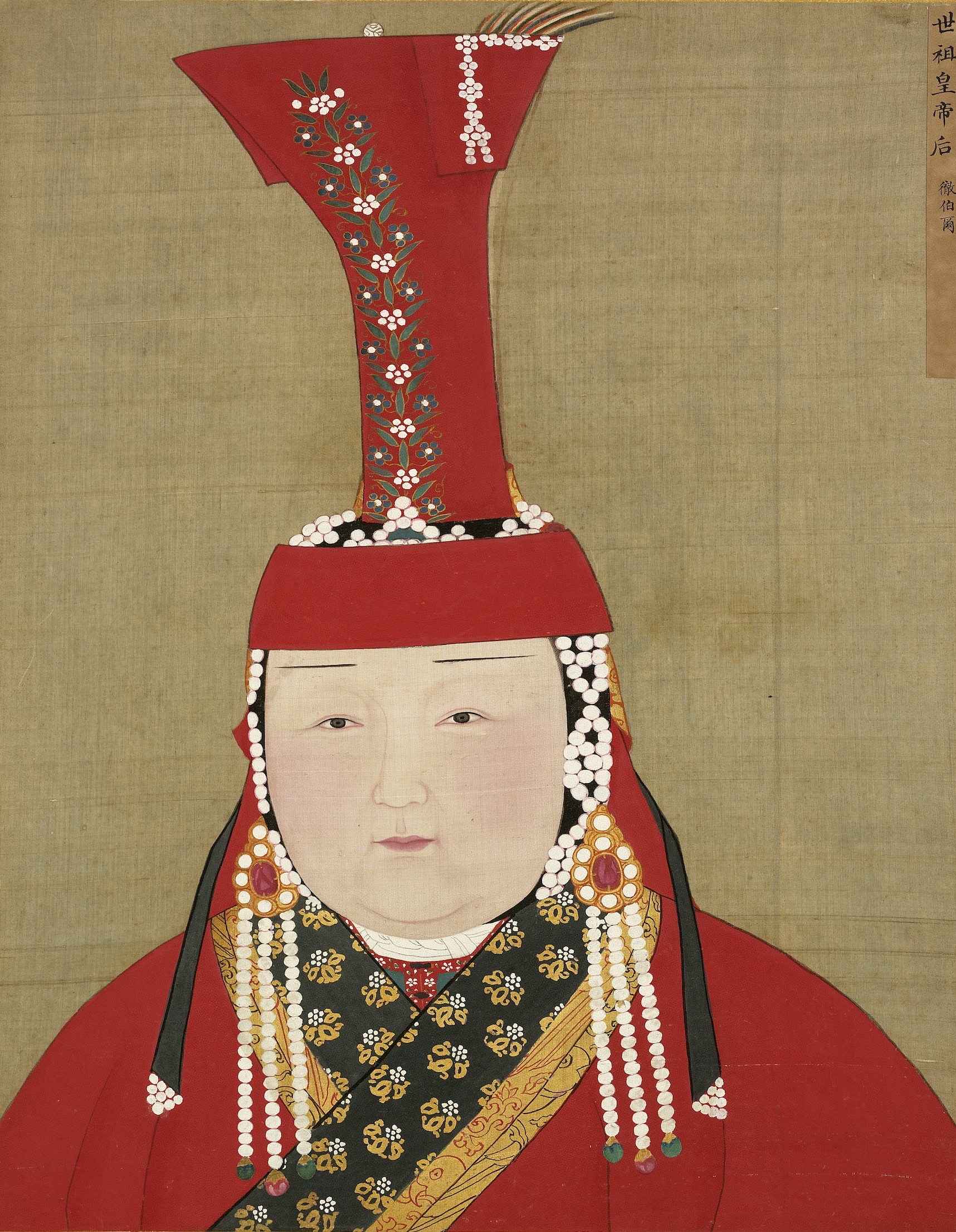
Chabi, wife of Kublai Khan

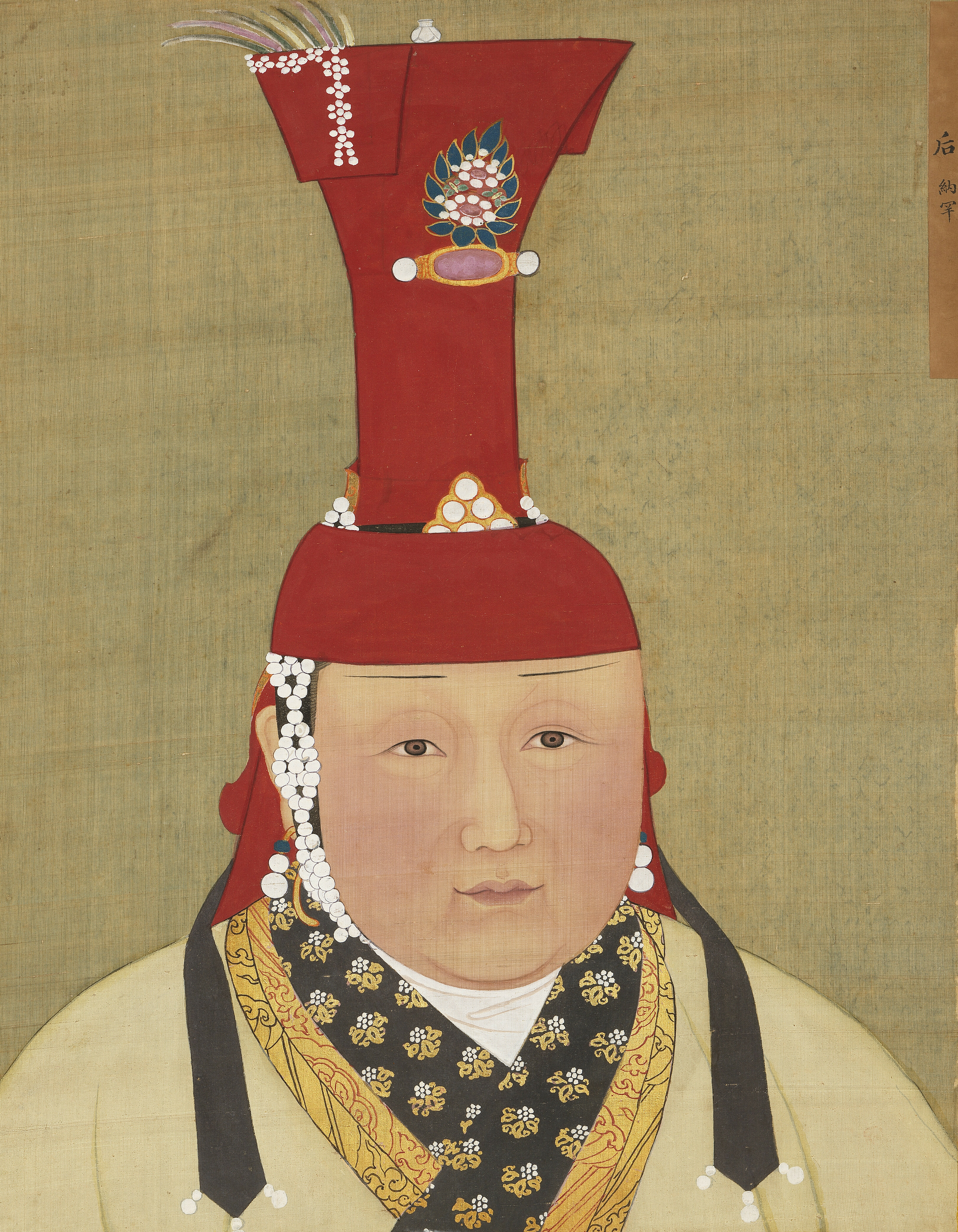
Nambui, wife of Kublai Khan after Chabi's death

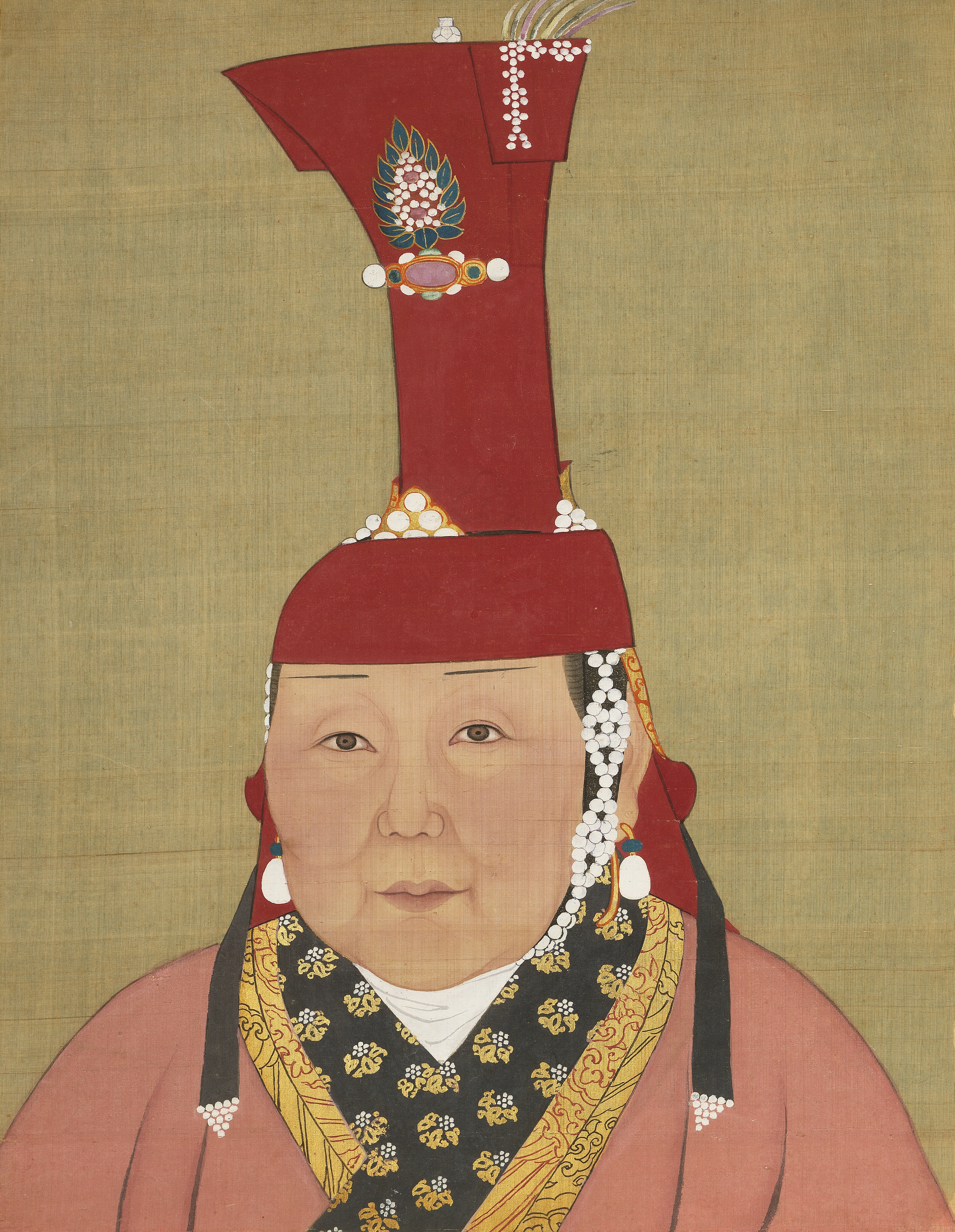
Shirindari, wife of Temür Khan

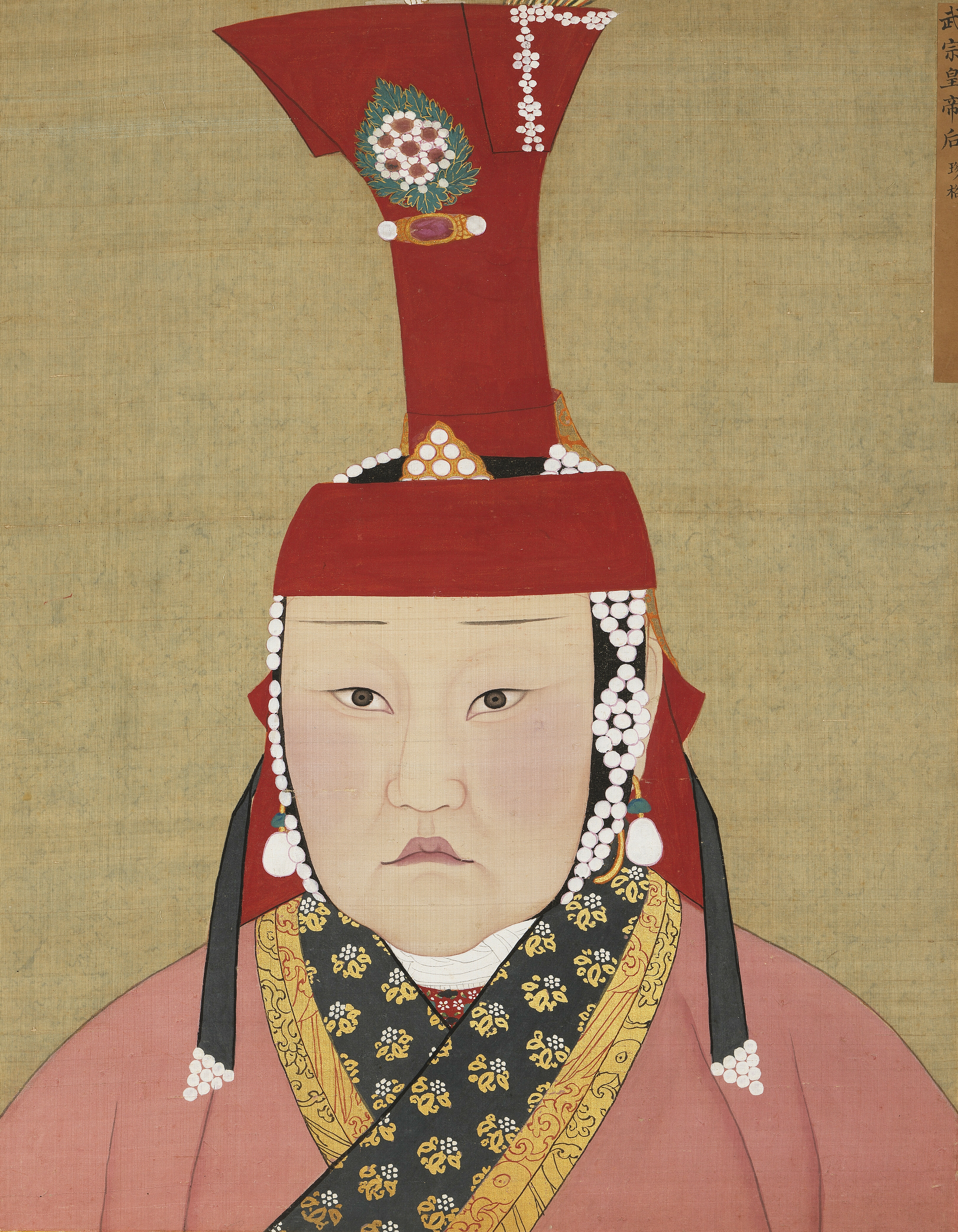
Zhenge, wife of Külüg Khan

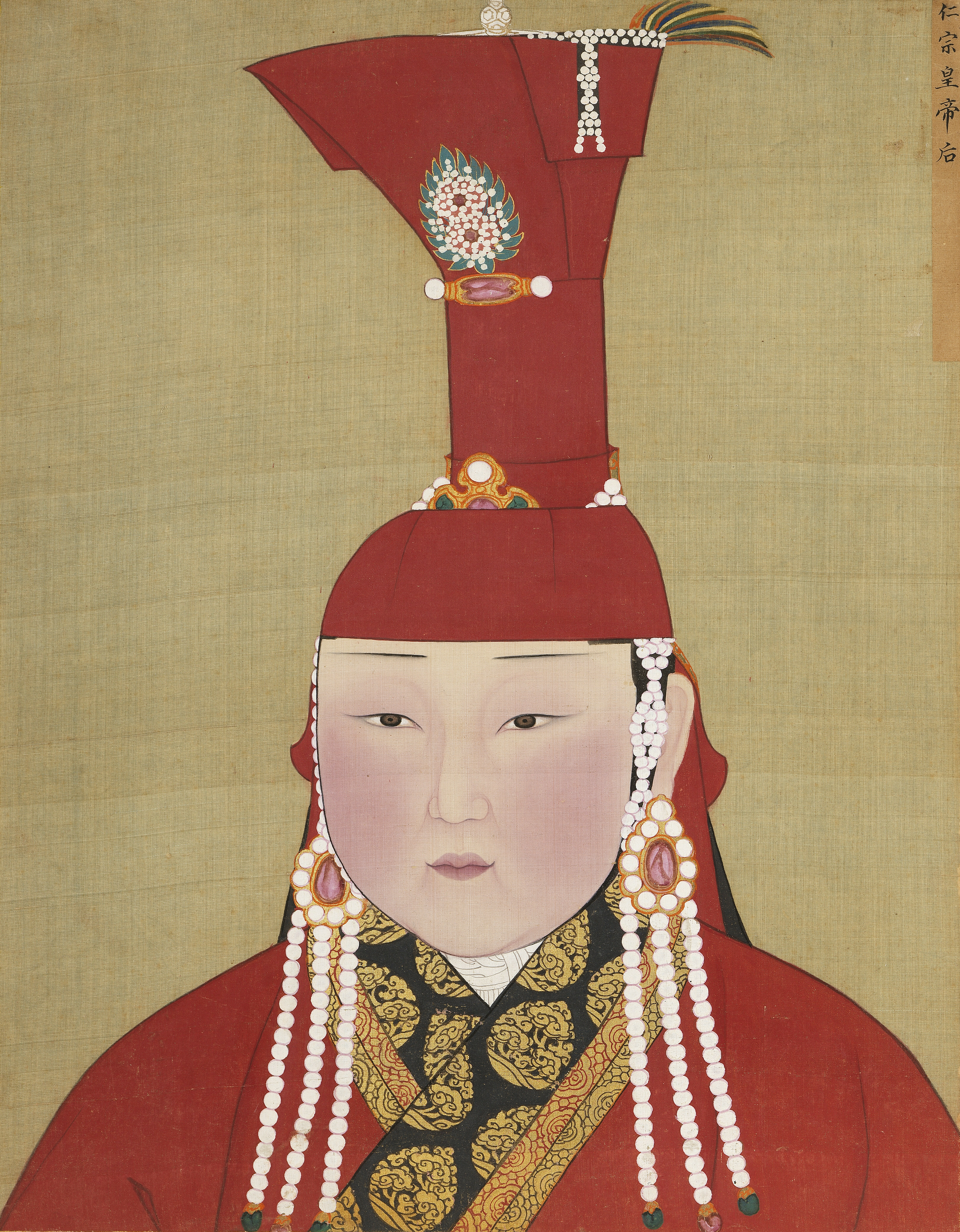
Radnashiri, wife of Ayurbarwada Buyantu Khan

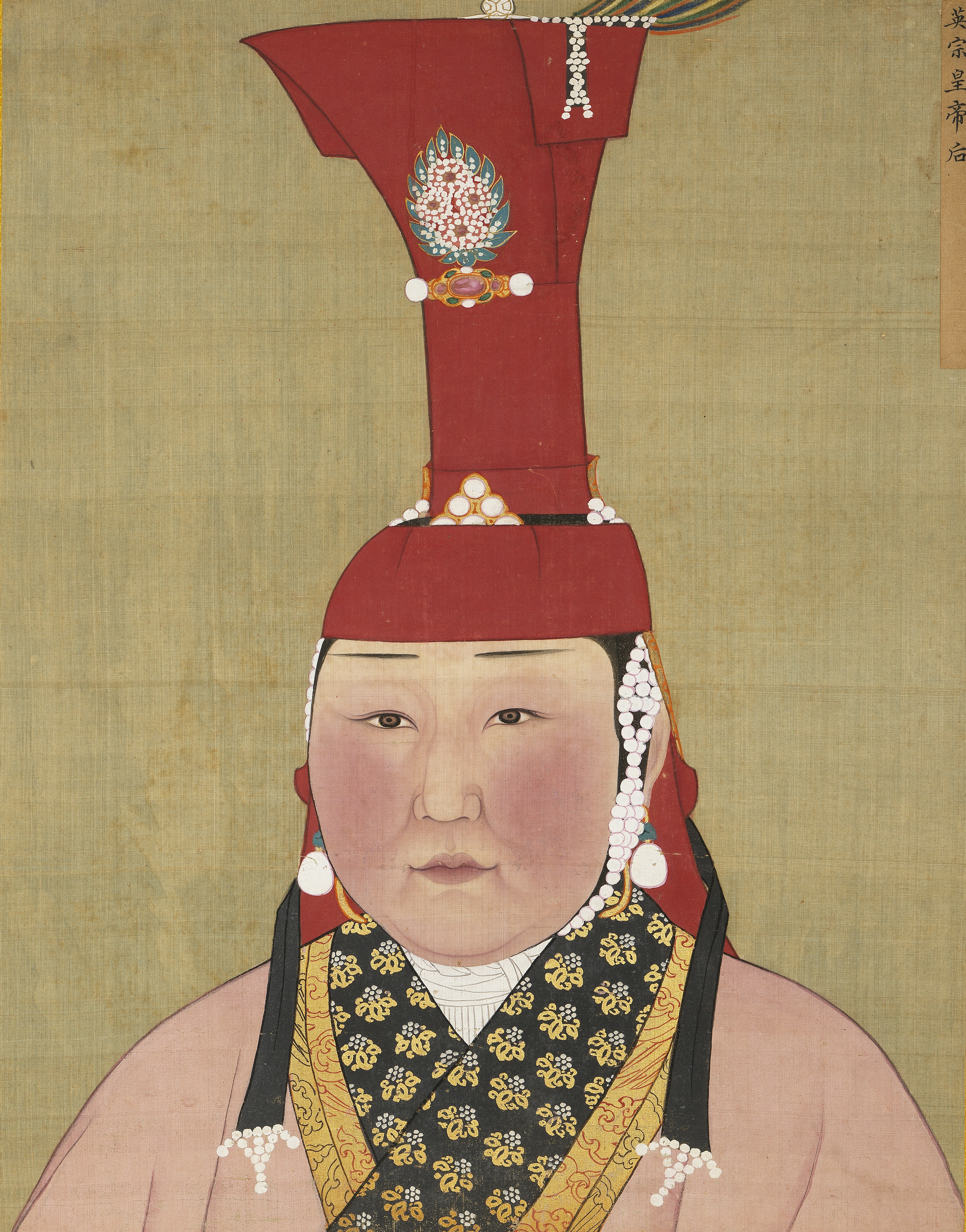
Sugabala, wife of Gegeen Khan

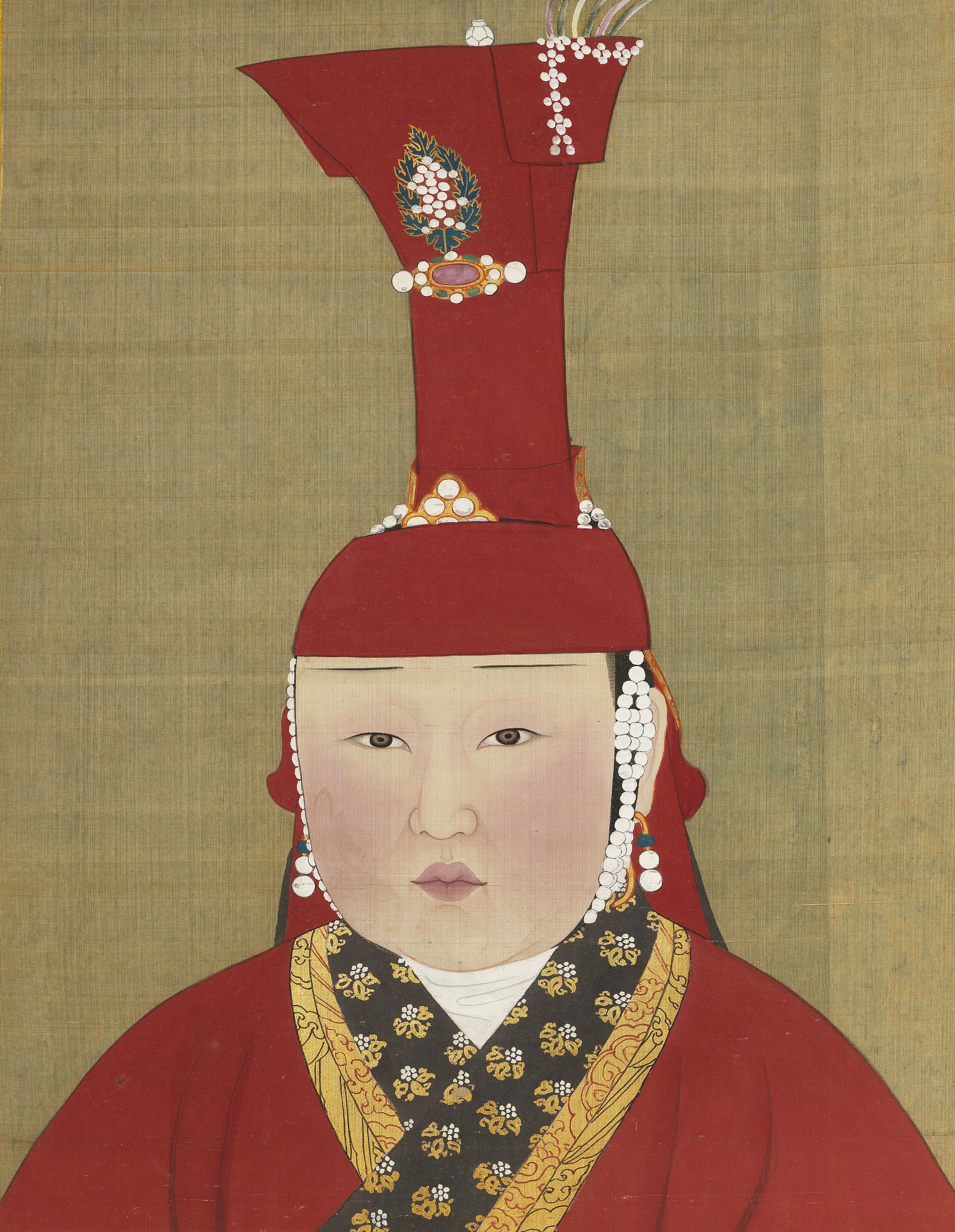
Babukhan, wife of Yesün Temür

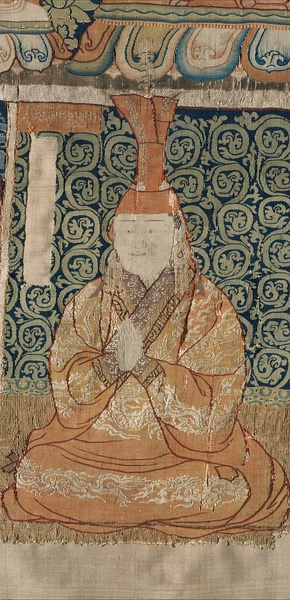
Budashiri, wife of Jayaatu Khan Tugh Temür

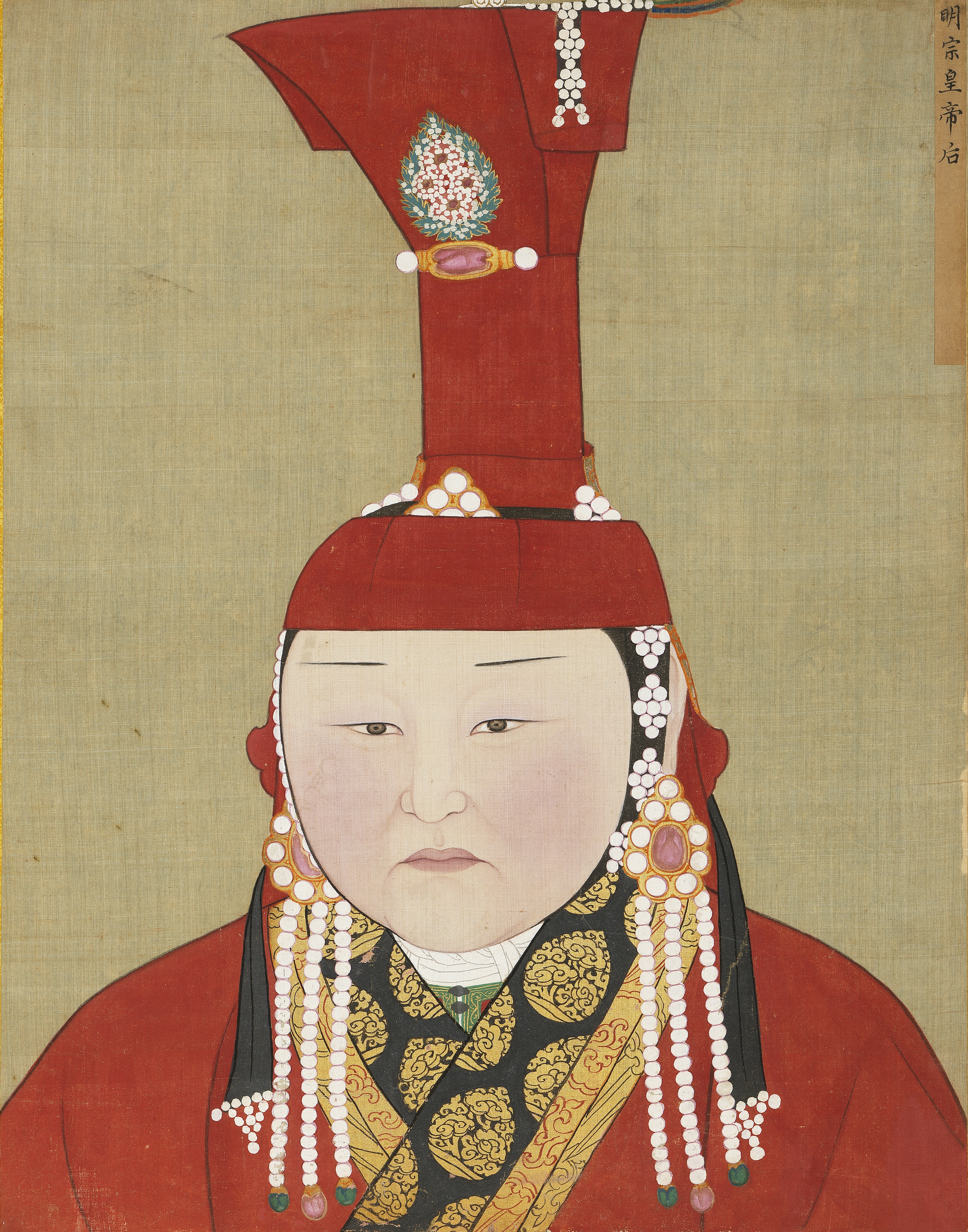
Babusha, wife of Khutughtu Khan Kusala

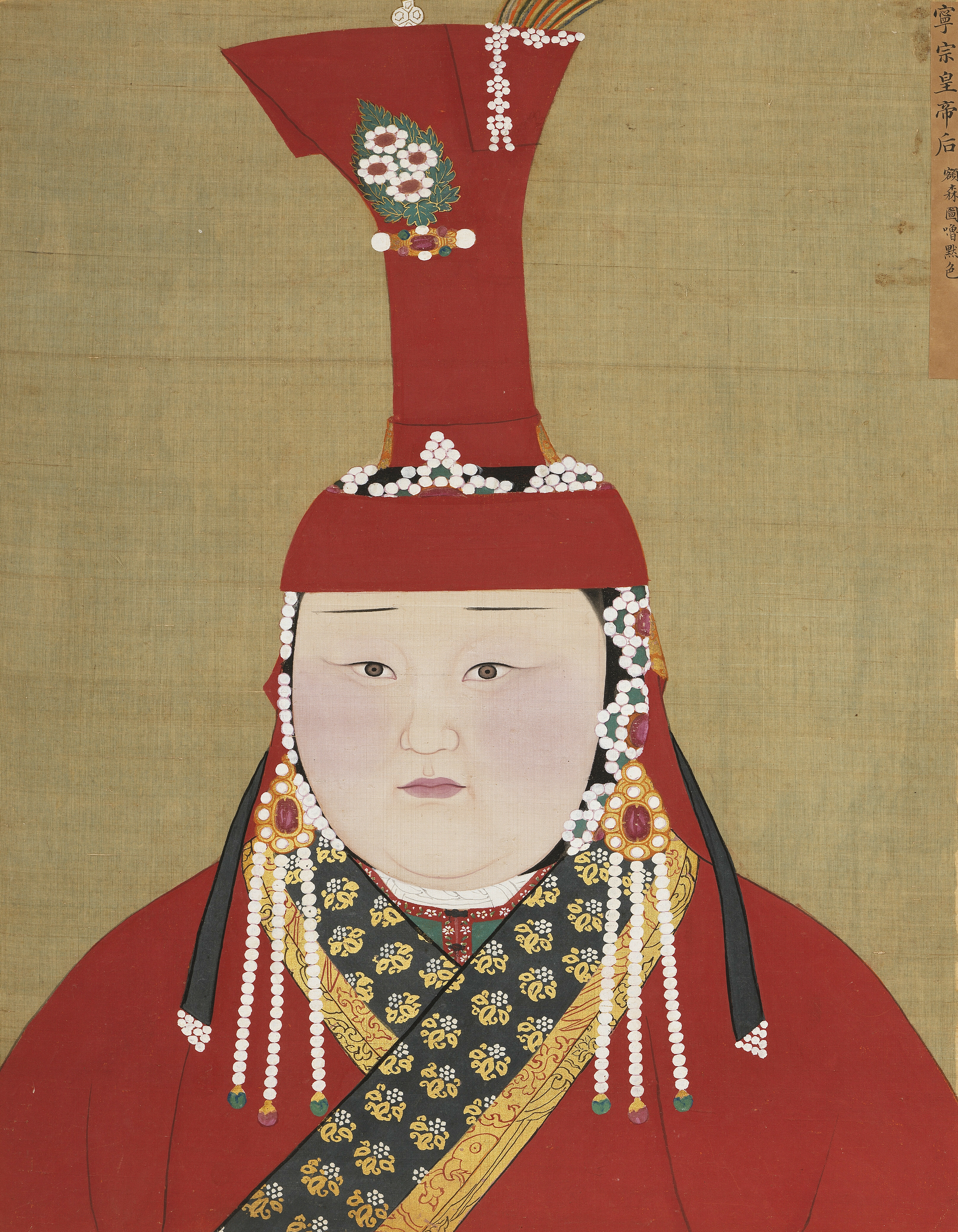
Daliyetemishi, wife of Rinchinbal Khan

== See also ==
- List of Yuan emperors
- List of Mongol khatuns
- List of consorts of rulers of China
