= Dagi Khatun =

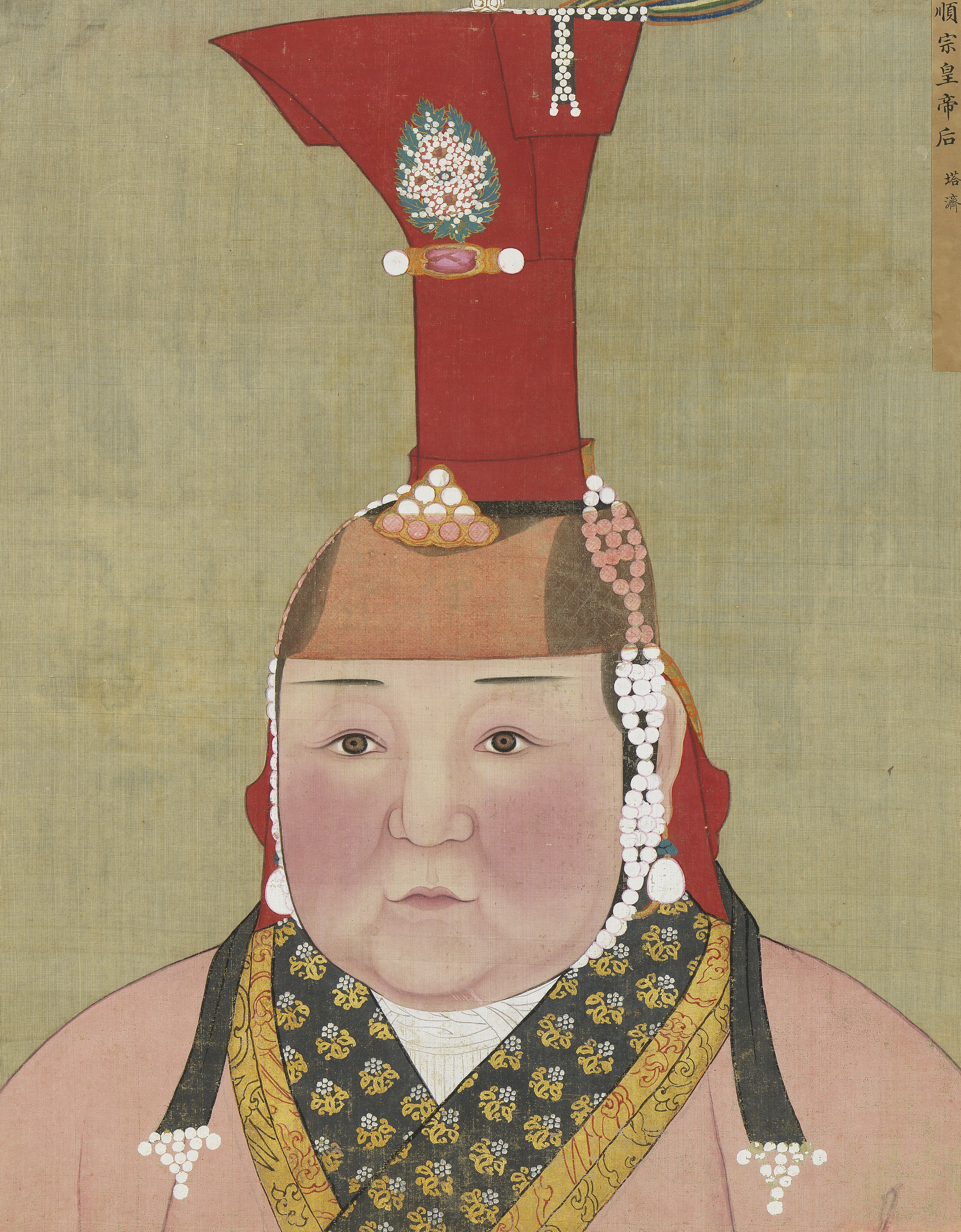

Empress Dowager of the Yuan dynasty
- Tenure: 1 June 1307 – 1 March 1320
- Predecessor: Empress Dowager Kökejin
- Successor: Empress Dowager Radnashiri

Grand Empress Dowager of the Yuan dynasty
- Tenure: 19 April 1320 – 1 November 1322
- Predecessor: Xie Daoqing (in Southern Song dynasty)
- Successor: Grand Empress Dowager Budashiri
- Born: 31 July 1262
- Died: 1 November 1322 (aged 60)
- Spouse: Darmabala
- Issue: Kulug Khan; Buyantu Khan
Posthumous name
- Empress Zhaoxian Yuansheng (昭獻元聖皇后)
- House: Khongirad
- Father: Kundu Temür
- Religion: Buddhist

Dagi (Mongolian: Тажи хатан, ᠲᠠᠵᠢ; Chinese: 答己; pinyin: Dájǐ), also rendered as Taji and Tagi, was a Mongol noblewoman who later became empress dowager and grand empress dowager of China's Mongol-led Yuan dynasty. She was the mother of Ayurbarwada Buyantu Khan (Emperor Renzong).

== Early life ==
Her early life is unknown. She was from Khongirad clan, daughter of Kundu Temür, niece of Chabi and Nambui. She was married to Darmabala, son of Zhenjin, Crown Prince of Yuan around 1278. After Darmabala's death in 1292, she was forced to raise her sons alone, allying herself to Kökejin, widow of Zhenjin. She came into conflict with Empress Bulughan, widow of Temür Khan in 1306. Bulugan attempted to set up Muslim Ananda, son of Manggala as new khagan and exiled Dagi and his son Ayurbarwada to Huaizhou. Her alliance was supported by some senior officials of the Secretariat under Aqutai. Ananda was a popular prince who successfully protected the provinces of the Yuan against the Ögedeid and Chaghatayid armies and had a bulk of the imperial army under him in Anxi. But he lacked military power in the imperial capital city and was a Muslim contrary to the majority of the Buddhist and Tengriist Mongols. The Khongirad faction in court was alarmed by it and under the leadership of Khayishan and his 30,000 strong army, they arrested Ananda and Bulugan in a coup and recalled Ayurbarwada and Dagi Khatun from Henan. Then Khayishan decided to hold the coronation ceremony in Shangdu just as his great-grandfather Khubilai Khan did, and advanced southward with the most part of his army. He was welcomed by Ayurbarwada, who gave up temporary khanship, and ascended to the throne. They executed Ananda, Bulugan and their retainers in 1307.

== As empress dowager ==
=== During reign of Külüg ===
She was created empress dowager upon ascendance of her son Külüg to khaganate and was granted Longfu Palace in Khanbaliq. She was later granted Xingsheng Palace in 1308 and a new title associated with it in 1310. She was known as a patron of Buddhism and befriended Chungseon of Goryeo, attending Buddhist ceremonies in Wutai Mountain with him.

=== During reign of Ayurbarwada ===
Her influence only grew during reign of her second son Ayurbarwada. She found a powerful ally in person of Temüder (d. 1322), grand councillor. Temüder chipped away at the autonomy of the princely appanages and executed Confucian opponents. Since Temüder was viewed by Confucians as an "evil minister", opponents of fiscal centralization charged Temüder with corruption; and Ayurbawada had to dismiss him in 1317 despite influence of his mother.

=== During reign of Gegeen Khan ===
After Ayurbawada's death and start of her grandson Gegeen Khan's reign in early 1320 she returned to political scene, restoring Temüder to government. Gegeen was already installed as crown prince in 1316 under influence of Dagi, who saw him as more controllable. Temüder was appointed as his tutor after dismissal by Ayurbarwada. Dagi was also granted a new long title, as such she was one of few women in Chinese history who received multiple titles from reigning emperors. Later years Gegeen grow more willful and eventually gained his political independence after deaths of Temüder and Dagi in 1322. She was posthumously renamed Empress Zhaoxian Yuansheng (Chinese: 昭獻元聖皇后; lit. 'Illustrated', 'dedicated', 'original and holy empress') on 22 March 1323 by Gegeen.

== Titles ==
- Empress Dowager Zhaoxian Yuansheng (1307) by Külüg Khan
- Empress Dowager Tianyi Xingsheng Zhaoxian Yuansheng (1310) by Külüg Khan
- Empress Dowager Tianyi Xingsheng Zhaoxian Yuansheng Ciren Zhaoyi Shouyuan Quande Taining Fuqing (1315) by Ayurbarwada Buyantu Khan
- Great Empress Dowager Tianyi Xingsheng Zhaoxian Yuansheng Ciren Zhaoyi Shouyuan Quande Taining Fuqing Huiwen Chongyou (1320) by Gegeen Khan
