= List of Mongol consorts =

The following is a list of Mongol consorts. This is list of the consorts of Mongol khagans.

== Mongol Empire ==
=== Maternal generation ===
1. Hö'elün, mother of Genghis Khan

=== Genghis Khan's generation ===
1. Börte Khatun (1206–1227), chief wife of Genghis Khan
2. Yesugen Khatun, second-ranking khatun of Genghis Khan in seniority
3. Yesui Khatun, third-ranking khatun of Genghis Khan in seniority
4. Khulan Khatun, fourth-ranking khatun of Genghis Khan in seniority

=== Descendants ===
1. Borogchin Khatun (1228–1240)
2. Töregene Khatun (1240–1246)
3. Oghul Qaimish (1246–1251)
4. Qutugui Khatun (1251–1260)

== Yuan dynasty ==
1. Chabi (1260–1281), empress to Kublai Khan
2. Nambui (1283–1294), empress to Kublai Khan
3. Shirindari (1294–1305), empress to Temür Khan
4. Bulugan (1295–1307), empress to Temür Khan
5. Zhenge (1307–1311), empress to Külüg Khan
6. Radnashiri (1313–1320), empress to Ayurbarwada Buyantu Khan
7. Sugabala (1321–1323), empress to Gegeen Khan
8. Babukhan Khatun (1324–1328), empress to Yesün Temür Khan
9. Budashiri (1328–1329), empress to Jayaatu Khan (first term)
10. Babusha (1329–1329), empress to Khutughtu Khan
11. Budashiri (1329–1332), empress to Jayaatu Khan (second term)
12. Daliyetemishi (1332–1332), empress to Rinchinbal Khan
13. Danashri (1333–1335), empress to Ukhaantu Khan
14. Bayan Khutugh (1337–1365), empress to Ukhaantu Khan
15. Empress Gi (1340–1370), empress to Ukhaantu Khan

== Northern Yuan ==
1. Ikh Habartu Jungen khatun
2. Mandukhai Khatun
3. Sutai taikhu
4. Nagnan taikhu, origin name is Borjigin Namuzhong and is a descendant of Belgutei. Formerly a queen of Ligden khutugtu khan who later married Hong Taiji of the Qing dynasty emperor in 1635. Gave birth to two sons and one girl.
5. Badamjav khatun, she married twice, first with Ligdan khan and later Hong taiji.
6. Erzhei taikhu
7. Gurtumen ujin
8. Boqi ujin

== Bogd Khanate of Mongolia (1911–24) ==
1. Dondogdulam (1911–1923)
2. Genepil (1923–1924)

== See also ==
- List of Mongol rulers
