= Budashiri =

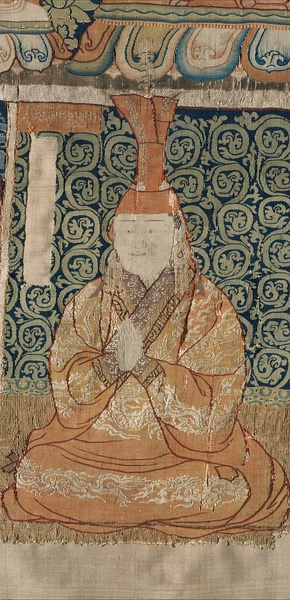

Empress consort of the Yuan dynasty and Khatun of Mongols
- Tenure: 16 October 1328 – 26 February 1329
- Predecessor: Babukhan
- Successor: Babusha
- Tenure: 8 September 1329 – 2 September 1332
- Predecessor: Babusha
- Successor: Daliyetemishi

Empress Dowager of the Yuan dynasty
- Tenure: 2 September 1332 — 19 July 1333
- Predecessor: Empress Dowager Babukhan
- Successor: None

Grand Empress Dowager of the Yuan dynasty
- Tenure: 19 July 1333 – c. 1340
- Predecessor: Grand Empress Dowager Dagi
- Successor: None
- Born: 1305
- Died: 1340 (aged 34–35)
- Spouse: Jayaatu Khan Tugh Temür
- Issue: Aratnadara Borjigin; El Tegüs; Taipingna
- House: Khongirad
- Father: Diwabala
- Mother: Sengge Ragi

Budashiri, alternatively rendered as Buddhashiri and Putashali (Mongolian: ᠪᠤᠳᠢᠰᠢᠷᠢ, Budashri; Chinese: 卜答失里; c. 1307 – c. 1340), was an empress consort of China's Yuan dynasty as the wife of Jayaatu Khan Tugh Temür (Emperor Wenzong). She acted as an interim regent and was the prominent figure of the Yuan dynasty between 1332 and 1339; she was interim regent after the death of her husband and the election of his successor in 1332-1333, and then regent during the minority of his successor in 1333-1339.

She came from the Khongirad clan. Her father was Prince Consort Diwabala, Prince of Lu, and her mother was Princess Supreme of Lu, Sengge Ragi.

== Empress of Yuan ==
It is uncertain when Budashiri became the wife of Tugh Temür, though she became empress in 1328 when her husband ascended the throne for the first time. In the early part of 1329, she received the imperial seal.

During her husband's reign, the empress was responsible for exiling the young Toghon Temür to Goryeo, and then to Henan. Her claim was that he was not the actual son of Khutughtu Khan Kusala (Emperor Mingzong), Tugh Temür's older brother. It was during Toghon Temür's exile that Budashiri also arranged for the execution of his stepmother, Babusha, having accused her of the coup against her late husband.

== Regency ==
When Tugh Temür died in 1332, Budashiri acted as regent, which was in accordance with tradition and because Tugh Temür had not named a successor. It is said that on his deathbed, Tugh Temür had expressed remorse for what he had done to his elder brother, and intended to pass the throne on to his nephew Toghon Temür, his brother's eldest son. As a result, Budashiri did not appoint her own son El Tegüs to the throne, but neither did she appoint Toghon Temür; it was Kusala's second son, the six-year-old Rinchinbal, who was instead installed as emperor on 13 October 1332. This the empress did under pressure from the grand councilor, El Temür, who resisted allowing Toghon Temür to accede to the throne since he was suspected of having poisoned his father. A month after she had appointed Rinchinbal, Budashiri was granted the rank of empress dowager, and was tasked with assuming the regency. However, only two months (fifty-three days) later, the young emperor died.

El Temür went on to insist that she install El Tegüs on the throne, but the empress refused, maintaining that she was still honouring the wishes of her late husband, and that El Tegüs was too young to rule. Instead, she brought back the thirteen-year-old Toghon Temür and installed him as emperor in 1333. In 1336, she was elevated to the rank of grand empress dowager.

Budashiri remained regent for over seven years, virtually ruling over the empire. However, in 1340, when the emperor grew confident that he could take control and decide matters, he began an investigation into the injustices suffered by his late father and stepmother. He also pointed out the various wrongs done to him by the grand empress dowager. As a result, in mid-1340 he ordered that Budashiri be stripped of all her titles and exiled to Dong'an Prefecture (the modern-day city of Langfang in Hebei Province), where she was swiftly put to death. In further retaliation for the difficulties he had faced while in exile, Toghon Temür also banished El Tegüs, who was killed shortly afterwards. Budashiri was about 33 years old when she died.

== Family ==
It is thought she had borne him at least three sons:

1. Aratnadara (d. 22 February 1331)
2. Gunadara, later renamed El Tegüs (c. 1329 – c. 1340)
3. Baoning, later renamed Taipingna (died young)

It is not known if she had any daughters.

== In art ==
A portrait of Empress Budashiri, alongside Empress Babusha, is found on the Yamantaka-Vajrabhairava mandala. Opposite of the two empresses are portraits of Tugh Temür and Kusala.

== In popular culture ==
- Portrayed by Kim Seo-hyung in the 2013-14 MBC television series Empress Ki.

Chinese royalty
Preceded by Babukhan	Empress of the Yuan dynasty 1328–1329	Succeeded by Babusha
Chinese royalty
Preceded by Babusha	Empress of the Yuan dynasty 1329–1332	Succeeded by Daliyetemishi
