= Sengge Ragi =

Chinese Yuan dynasty princess

Sengge Ragi (Chinese: 祥哥剌吉, c. 1283–1331), noble title Princess Supreme of Lu (魯國大長公主), was a princess of the Yuan dynasty of China. She was a daughter of Darmabala, and a sister of Külüg Khan (Emperor Wuzong) and Buyantu Khan (Emperor Renzong). She was a collector of Chinese works of art and calligraphy. She was a patroness of the arts, having commissioned works of art and calligraphy during her lifetime. Most of her collection dated to the period of the Song dynasty.

== Early life ==
Sengge Ragi was the daughter of Darmabala (posthumously known as Shun-tsung) (b. ca. 1265 – d. 1310), who, according to the History of Yuan, was the eldest son of Zhenjin, second son of Kublai Khan as well as his heir apparent until his death. Darmabala had a close relationship with his father, who greatly valued Chinese culture and learning. Her mother was Dagi, who came from the influential Khongirad tribe.

The princess had three brothers: the eldest, a step-brother, was eventually invested with the title of Prince of Wei. The other two brothers were full brothers and became emperors. Khayishan, her elder brother, ruled from 1307 until his death in 1311, and was succeeded by his brother, Ayurbarwada, who ruled from 1311 to 1320. It was from these two brothers that Sengge Ragi first rose to great prominence.

In his first year as emperor, her elder brother, as Külüg Khan, granted her the titles of Grand Princess of Lu (魯國長公主) and Princess Supreme of Lu (魯國大長公主). Normally an emperor's sisters are only accorded the title of "grand princess", as "princess supreme" is traditionally reserved for his aunts.

Her husband, Diwabala, was granted the title of Prince Consort of Lu. The following year, he granted her the Route of Yongping, from which she could receive income. He also desired that she have Yongping’s salt taxes, but this was opposed by officials of the Secretariat.

Sengge Ragi’s younger brother, as Buyantu Khan, also increased his sister’s fortune. He gave to her a grant of 10,000 ding in currency (equal to 500,000 ounces of silver), and soon after granted her the title of “Imperial Elder Sister and Princess Supreme” (皇姊大長公主; huángzǐ, dàzháng gōngzhǔ).

== Religious charity ==
In 1319, the princess sponsored a series of charitable acts in accordance with her Buddhist faith. The most notable of these acts was the release of twenty-seven important prisoners from the Ch’uan-ning District. These prisoners were later recaptured, however, as the pardoning of criminals was solely the prerogative of the emperor.

== The "Elegant Gathering" ==
In 1323, Sengge Ragi held a historic "elegant gathering", which was made unique by the fact that the event was hosted by a woman. During the event, a number of scrolls were brought out and the scholars present were instructed to add colophons to them. A series of notable calligraphies and paintings were presented at this event, most dating from the Song period, and today there are some fifteen extant works of art that bear either one or both of the princess's seals: the "Library of the Imperial Elder Sister" (皇姊圖書; huángzǐ túshū) and "Precious Plaything of the Imperial Elder Sister" (皇姊珍玩; huángzǐ zhēnwán).

== The "Imperial Aunt" ==
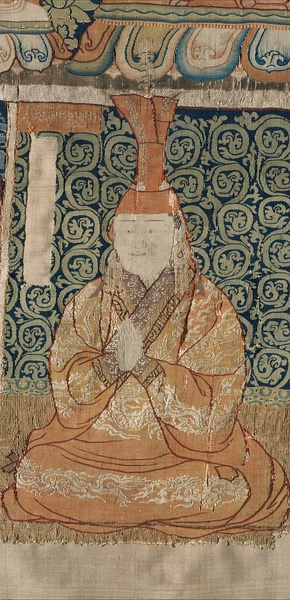
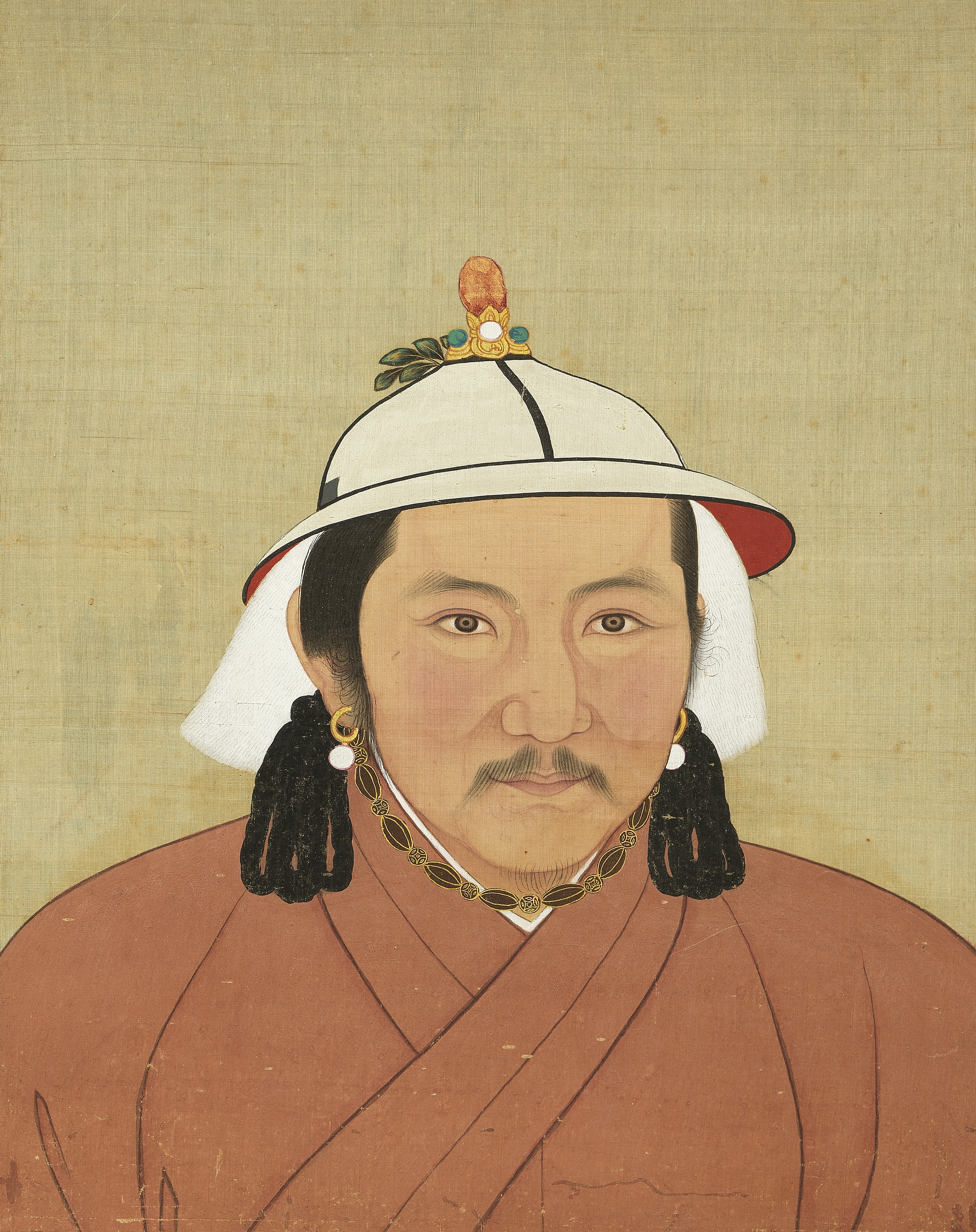
Budashiri (her daughter) and Tugh Temür (her son-in-law/nephew)

Although the elegant gathering of 1323 stood as the pinnacle of the princess's career, it was not the end of her power and influence. The following year, her daughter, Budashiri, married Tugh Temür, Sengge Ragi's nephew (the son of her elder brother Khayishan).

When Tugh Temür ascended to the throne in 1328, he increased his mother-in-law's position considerably with new titles and wealth, as well as the title of “Imperial Aunt” (皇姑; huánggū).

Early in 1329, he granted her 20,000 ding in currency in order to build a residence, and some months later gave her another 20,000 ding for building costs. Late in that year, Tugh Temür issued an imperial edict, which was for the collection of rent from princes, princesses, government offices and temples, though the grand princess was excepted by name.

Several times over, the emperor granted his mother-in-law many gifts, not least in the form of vast sums of money, which she channelled into the construction of her residence, completed sometime in 1330 or early 1331. He gave her large acres of land, and appointed an administrator to oversee the construction of her residence. However, the illustrious grand princess would have had very little time to enjoy the completed work, as she died in early 1331.

Although heavily involved in the collecting of Chinese art and calligraphy, no stamps make any reference to the “Imperial Aunt”. It appears that in her later years, though her position was elevated and she became increasingly lavish in her spending, Sengge Ragi did not advance much as an art collector. Nevertheless, her unique role in hosting the elegant gathering and collecting many fine pieces of art during her lifetime grant her a unique position in the cultural legacy of the Yuan Dynasty.

== Sources ==
- Weidner, Marsha (1990). Flowering in the Shadows: Women in the History of Chinese and Japanese Painting. University of Hawaii Press. ISBN 978-0-8248-1149-5.
- Elliot, Jeannette Shambaugh; Shambaugh, David (2007). The Odyssey of China's Imperial Art Treasures (Samuel and Althea Stroum Books). University of Washington Press; 2nd printing ed. ISBN 978-0-2959-8688-3.
- Watt, James C. Y. (2010). The World of Khubilai Khan: Chinese Art in the Yuan Dynasty (Metropolitan Museum of Art). Metropolitan Museum of Art. ISBN 978-0-3001-6656-9.
