= Sugabala =

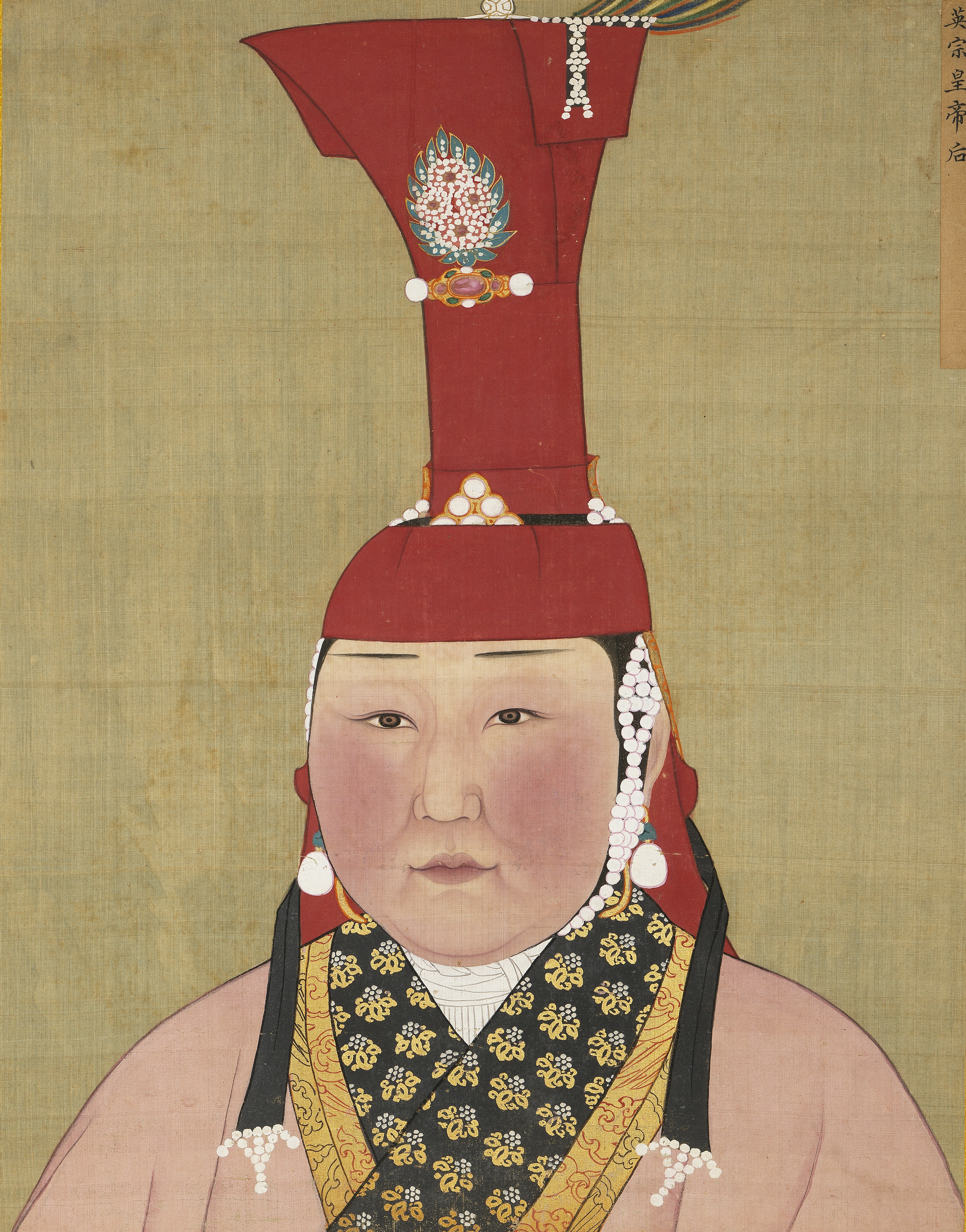

Empress consort of the Yuan dynasty and Khatun of Mongols
- Tenure: 1321–1323
- Predecessor: Empress Radnashiri
- Successor: Empress Babukhan
- Died: 1327
- Spouse: Gegeen Khan
Posthumous name
- Empress Zhuangjing Yisheng (莊靜懿聖皇后)
- House: Ikires
- Father: Prince Ashi
- Mother: Yilihaiya

Sugabala or Sügebala (Mongolian: Сугабал, Chinese: 速哥八剌, died 1327) was an empress consort of the Yuan dynasty, married to Gegeen Khan (Emperor Yingzong). Her Parents is Ashi & Yilihaiya Granddaughter of Temür Khan

== Life ==
She was born to Ashi Küregen from Ikires clan of Khongirad tribe and Princess Ilig Qaya, daughter of Temür Khan. His father Ashi was son of Buqa of Ikires and Princess Ulujin, daughter of Kublai Khan and Chabi khatun. She had 7 brothers and a sister - Yilianzhenbala, who was khatun of Yesün Temür. She was created empress in 1321 but this lasted short as Gegeen Khan was assassinated 2 years later. She was given posthumous title Empress Zhuāngjìngyì Shèng (Chinese: 庄静懿圣皇后; lit. 'Sedate', 'quite', 'beautiful and holy empress') by Yesün Temür after her death.

Chinese royalty
Preceded by Radnashiri	Empress of the Yuan dynasty 1321–1323	Succeeded by Babukhan
