= Babukhan =

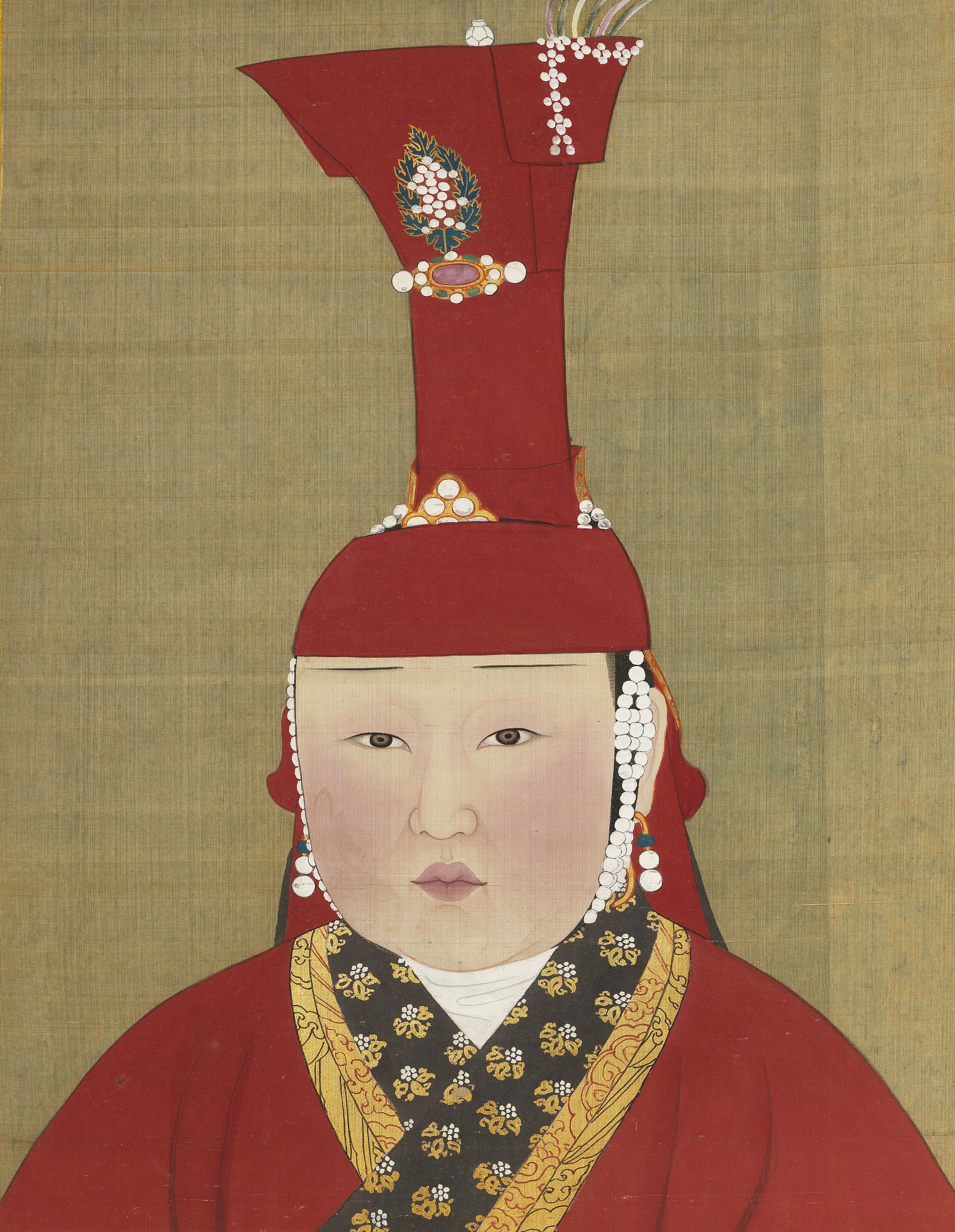

Empress consort of the Yuan dynasty and Khatun of Mongols
- Tenure: 1324 — 15 August 1328
- Predecessor: Empress Sugabala
- Successor: Empress Budashiri

Empress Dowager of the Yuan dynasty
- Tenure: October — 14 November 1328
- Predecessor: Empress Dowager Radnashiri
- Successor: Empress Dowager Budashiri
- Born: 1296
- Died: 1329 (aged 32–33)
- Spouse: Yesün Temür
- Issue: Ragibagh Khan
- House: Khongirad
- Father: Woliuchar
- Mother: Nanabula

Babukhan (fl. 1328) (Mongolian: Бабухан, Chinese: 八不罕) was the wife of Taiding Emperor of the Yuan dynasty. She served as regent in 1328.

== Life ==
Babukhan's father was either Woliuchar or Maizhuhan, both grandsons of Anchen. She was established as empress in the third month of the first year of Taiding's reign (1324).

Her husband died four years later in Shangdu and she instantly went into motion to assure that her son Ragibagh - the designated heir - would indeed ascend the throne. Babukhan immediately sent her envoys to seize the royal seals of office, and, when supporters of the former emperor Khaishan moved to enthrone one of his children, she pre-emptively had her son crowned with the reign name Tianshun. She would serve as his regent.

Babukhan sent troops to attack and punish the rebels, and many battles ensued; eventually her army was defeated. Tuq Temur, son of Khaishan, took power, and had Tianshun executed.

It is unknown what became of Babukhan afterwards. She wasn't given a posthumous due to the fact that she wasn't considered legitimate empress by Tugh Temür.

== Notes ==
Royal titles
Preceded by Sugabala	Empress of the Yuan dynasty 1324–1328	Succeeded by Budashiri
