= Babusha =

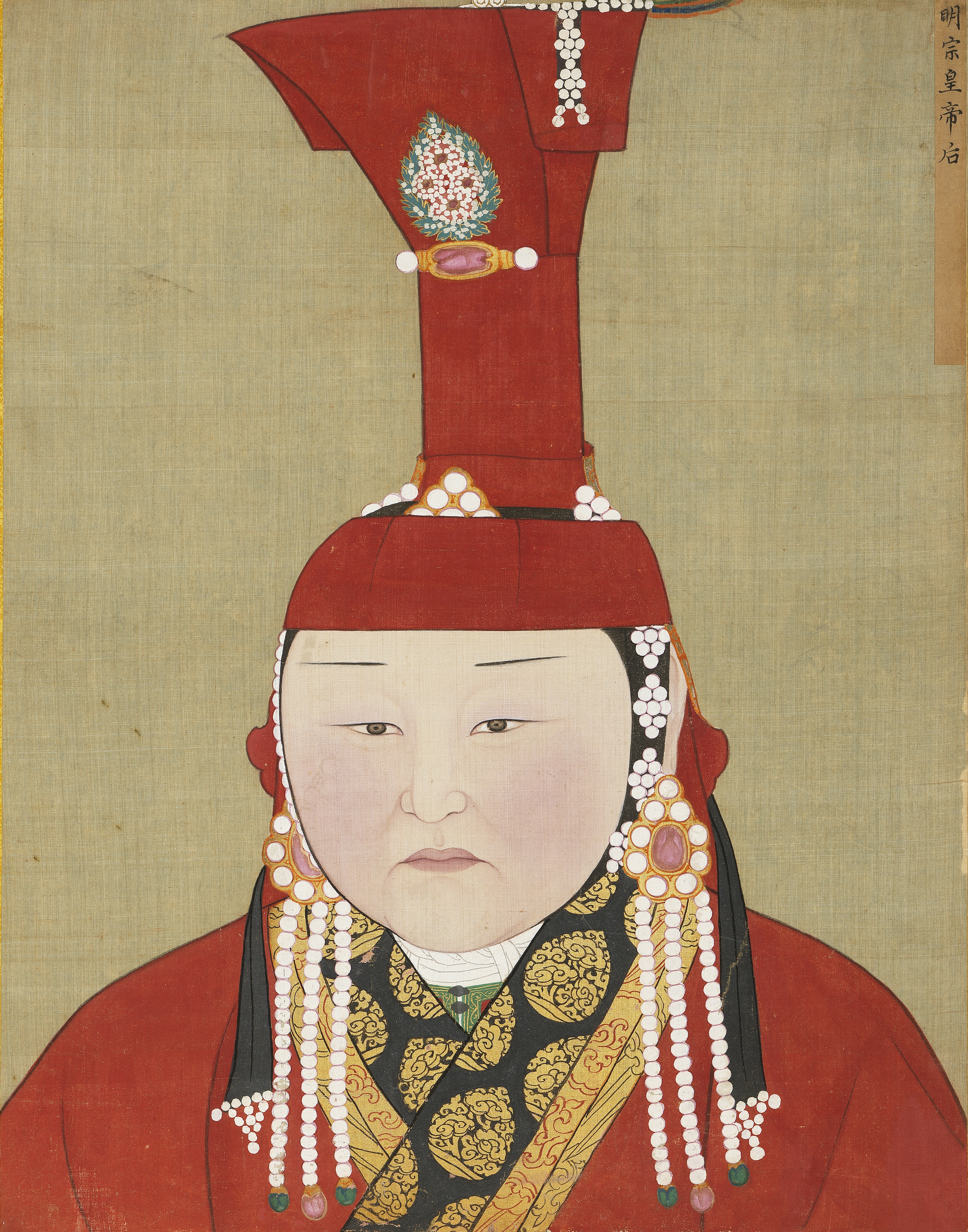

Empress consort of the Yuan dynasty and Khatun of Mongols
- Tenure: 1329 — 1330
- Predecessor: Empress Budashiri
- Successor: Empress Budashiri
- Born: 25 February 1302
- Died: 9 May 1330 (aged 28)
- Spouse: Khutughtu Khan
- Issue: Rinchinbal Khan
- Mother: Princess Shouning

Babusha (Mongolian: Бабуша, Chinese: 八不沙; died 1330) was a Naiman empress consort of the Yuan dynasty of China, married to the Khutughtu Khan (Emperor Mingzong).

She was born to Princess Shouning (壽寧公主), who was the niece of Öljeyitü Khan (Emperor Chengzong). She married Khutughtu Khan before he became emperor. She approved of the famous cook book of Huou, Yin-shan Zhengyao (1330).

After the death of her spouse, the execution of Babusha, in parallel with the exile of Toghon Temür (the later Emperor Shun) to Goryeo in May 1330, were both ordered by Budashiri, later Empress of China as the wife of Jayaatu Khan (Emperor Wenzong), to secure the succession of Aratnadara. She was executed after having accused Budashiri of staging a coup against her late husband.

== Notes ==
- George Qingzhi Zhao, Marriage as Political Strategy and Cultural Expression: Mongolian Royal ...
- Denis C. Twitchett, Herbert Franke, John King Fairbank, The Cambridge History of China: Volume 6, Alien Regimes and Border States ...
- Mary Ellen Snodgrass, World Food: An Encyclopedia of History, Culture and Social Influence from ...

Chinese royalty
Preceded by Budashiri	Empress of the Yuan dynasty 1329–1329	Succeeded by Budashiri
