= Darmabala =

Yuan dynasty prince (1264–1292)

- Born: June 29, 1264
- Died: May 25, 1292 (aged 27)
- Spouse: Dagi
- Issue: Külüg Khan; Buyantu Khan; Sengge Ragi
Posthumous name
- Emperor Zhaosheng Yanxiao (昭聖衍孝皇帝)
Temple name
- Shunzong (順宗)
- House: Borjigin
- Father: Zhenjin
- Mother: Kökejin Khatun
- Religion: Buddhism

Darmabala, also rendered as Dharmapala (Standard Tibetan: ཆོས་སྐྱོང་, lit. 'Protector of the Law'; Mongolian: Дармабал, ᠳᠠᠷᠮᠠᠪᠠᠯᠠ; Chinese: 答剌麻八剌) was an imperial prince of the Yuan dynasty. He was a grandson of Kublai Khan and son of his Crown Prince Zhenjin. He was an ancestor of subsequent Yuan monarchs who came after Temür Khan (Emperor Chengzong) and Goryeo kings after King Gongmin.

== Biography ==
He was born in 1264 to Zhenjin and his wife Kökejin Khatun as the couple's second son. He was married to Dagi from Khongirad tribe around 1278. After Zhenjin's death on 5 January 1286, Darmabala came to be seen as a strong candidate for the position of heir-apparent by his grandfather and was appointed as commander of the Mongol army in Jeju Island. He was described by Marco Polo as 'rickety'. He was dispatched to Huaizhou by Kublai in 1291, where he fell ill. He was treated in Khanbaliq until 1292 and that is where he died. He was posthumously renamed Emperor Zhaosheng Yanxiao (昭聖衍孝皇帝) by Külüg Khan and was given the temple name Shunzong (顺宗).

== Family ==
He had three sons and a daughter from two wives:

1. Dagi Khatun, posthumously Empress Zhāoxiàn Yuánshèng (昭獻元聖皇后)
  - Khayishan, later Külüg Khan (Emperor Wuzong)
  - Ayurbarwada, later Buyantu Khan (Emperor Renzong)
  - Sengge Ragi of Lu
2. Concubine Guo (郭氏妃子)
  - Amuga (born before 1281, d. 1324) — 1st Prince of Wei (魏王)
    - Aruq (fl. 1330) — Prince of Xijing (西靖王)
    - Bulu Temür — 2nd Prince of Wei (魏王)
      - Princess Noguk (?–1365)
    - Naila Buqa
      - Buyan Temür — 3rd Prince of Wei (魏王)
    - Princess Joguk (1308–1325)
    - Bayan Khutag, Princess Gyeonghwa (d. 1344)
