= Radnashiri =

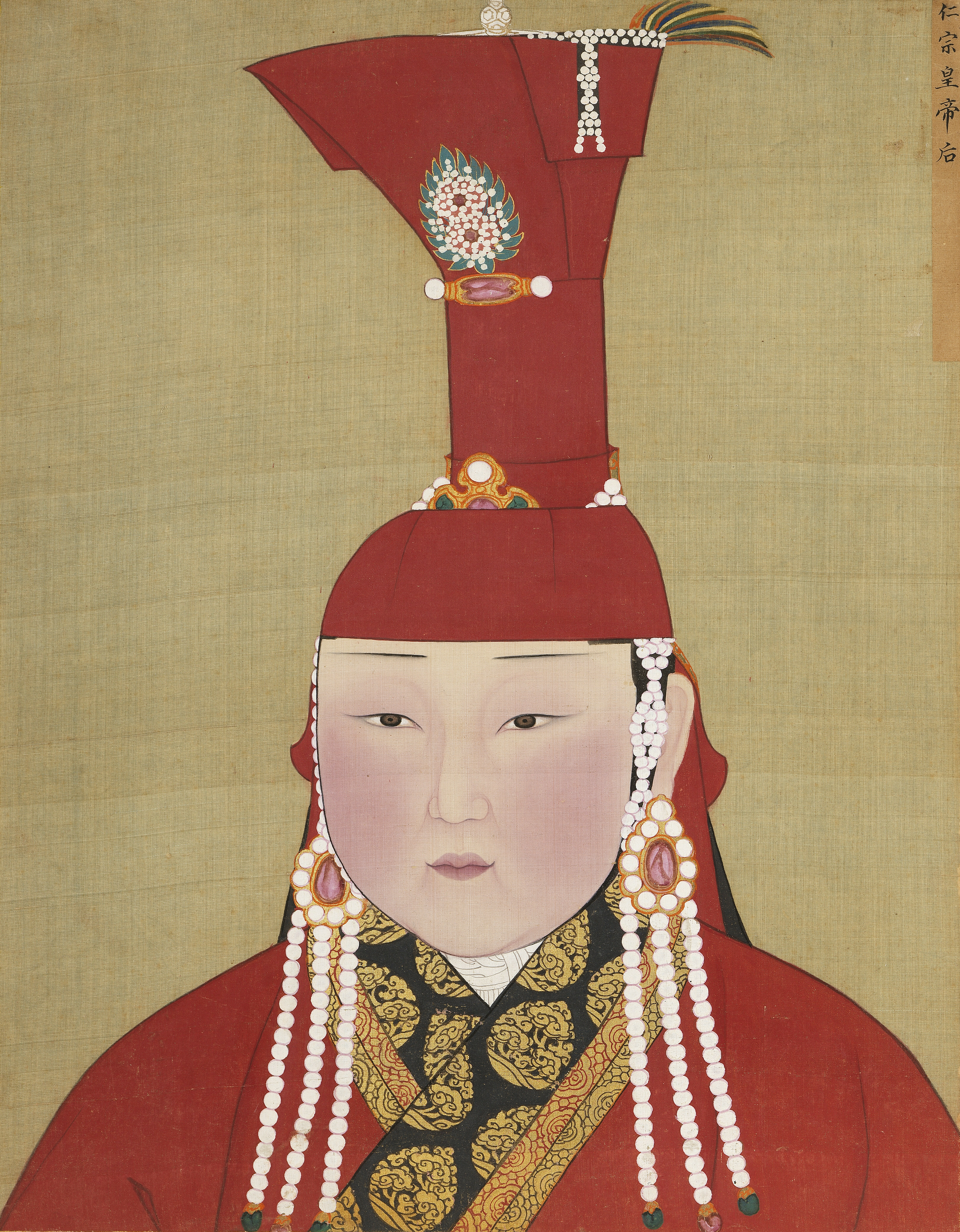

Empress consort of the Yuan dynasty and Khatun of Mongols
- Tenure: 7 April 1311 – 1 March 1320
- Predecessor: Empress Zhenge
- Successor: Empress Sugabala

Empress Dowager of the Yuan dynasty
- Tenure: 19 April 1320 — 1322
- Predecessor: Empress Dowager Dagi
- Successor: Empress Dowager Babukhan
- Born: c. 1286/1287
- Died: 1322 (aged 34- 36)
- Spouse: Ayurbarwada Buyantu Khan
- Issue: Gegeen Khan
Posthumous name
- Empress Zhuangyi Cisheng (莊懿慈聖皇后)
- House: Khongirad

Radnashiri or Aradnashiri, Anashisari (Mongolian: Раднашири хатан, Chinese: 阿納失失里) (died 1322) was an empress consort of the Yuan dynasty, married to Ayurbarwada Buyantu Khan (Emperor Renzong).

== Life ==
She was from the Khongirad tribe. It is not known when she met Ayurbarwada or his relation to any preceding empresses by blood. She gave birth to Shidibala on 22 February 1302. She became empress upon Ayurbarwada's elevation to throne in 1311. Her influence increased upon installment of Shidibala as the new crown prince but Dagi's influence strictly limited hers. She was created Empress Dowager in 1320 by his son, now Emperor Gegeen Khan. However, she soon died in 1322, around the very time Dagi fell from power as well. She was posthumously renamed Empress Zhuāngyìcí Shèng (Chinese: 庄懿慈圣皇后; lit. 'Sedate', 'beautiful', 'kind and holy empress') by Gegeen Khan and interred together with Ayurbarwada.

Chinese royalty
Preceded by Zhenge	Empress of the Yuan dynasty 1311–1320	Succeeded by Sugabala
