= Zhenjin =

- Prince of Yan
- Born: 8 July 1243
- Died: 5 January 1286 (aged 42)
- Spouse: Kökejin
- Issue: Gammala, father of Taiding; Darmabala; Chengzong
Posthumous name
- Crown Prince Mingxiao (明孝太子); Emperor Wenhui Mingxiao (文惠明孝皇帝)
Temple name
- Yuzong (裕宗)
- House: Borjigin
- Dynasty: Yuan dynasty
- Father: Kublai Khan
- Mother: Chabi
- Religion: Tibetan Buddhism

Zhenjin (Mongolian: Чингим, ᠴᠢᠩᠭᠢᠮ; Chinese: 真金; pinyin: Zhēnjīn; 8 July 1243 – 1285 or 5 January 1286), also rendered as Jingim, Chinkim, or Chingkim, was a crown prince of the Yuan dynasty of China. He was a son of Kublai Khan (Emperor Shizu) and grandson of Tolui. He was posthumously honored as an emperor by his son, Temür Khan (Emperor Chengzong).

== Life ==
He was born as the second son to Kublai Khan and first to Chabi Khatun. The Chinese Zen Buddhist monk Haiyun gave him the name Zhenjin ("True Gold") when he was born in 1243. He was created Prince of Yan (燕王), became the head of the Central Secretariat (Zhongshu Sheng) by his father in 1262, and was designated as the Crown Prince (皇太子) of the Yuan dynasty by Kublai Khan in 1273.

He was known as a strong supporter of Confucianism, having been tutored by Han scholars such as Yao Shu (1201–1278), Dou Mo (1196–1280), Liu Bingzhong (1216–1274) and Wang Xun. Among others, he was noted to have studied Classic of Poetry and Classic of Filial Piety. After the death of Zhenjin's rival Ahmad Fanakati (according to Rashid al-Din, as a result of a plot by Zhenjin), a Confucian-trained official in the South even proposed Kublai abdicate in favor of Zhenjin in 1285, as a result Kublai was furious. He was also known to be a friend of Drogön Chögyal Phagpa, who wrote the famous treatise "Explanation of the knowable" for Zhenjin.

According to the History of Yuan, he died of alcoholism on 5 January 1286, eight years before his father Kublai Khan. However, it may not have been as simple as merely drinking too much. It is also stated that shortly before his death, some ministers of the court wanted to propose that Kublai Khan abdicate his throne to Prince Zhenjin on account of old age and because Zhenjin was highly respected throughout the empire. However, Zhenjin tried to prevent this from happening. Unfortunately, Kublai Khan found out anyway and was furious, which terrified Zhenjin and may have led him to overdrink. Distressed by his death, Kublai Khan made Zhenjin's son Temür the new Crown Prince. He was posthumously renamed as Taizi Mingxiao by Kublai on 25 February 1293. Temür gave him posthumous name Emperor Wenhui Mingxiao (文惠明孝皇帝) and temple name Yuzong (Chinese: 裕宗; lit. 'Affluent Ancestor') on 3 June 1294.

== Family ==
He had a senior wife and a concubine:

- Empress Huirenyusheng, of the Hongjila clanfrom Khongirad tribe (徽仁裕聖皇后 弘吉剌氏, d.1300), personal name Kökejin (阔阔真)
  - Gammala, Prince of Jin (甘麻剌晋王, 1263–1302), 1st son
  - Darmabala, Shùnzōng (順宗答剌麻八剌, 1264–1292), 2nd son
  - Temür Khan, Crown Prince (三子 元成宗太子, 1265–1307), 3rd son
- Concubine Anchinmishi (安真迷失妃子)
- Unknown concubine
  - Qutadmish, Grand Princess of Qi (赵国公主忽答迭迷失), 1st daughter
    - married to Körgüz from Öngüds, son of Ay Buqa, Prince of Zhao (趙王) and Yuelie ( older sister of Zhenjin)
  - Nangabula, Grand Princess of Lu (鲁国公主喃哥不剌), 2nd daughter
    - married to Manzitai from Khongirad clan, Prince of Lu
  - Princess Budagan (不独感), 3rd daughter
    - married to Zangpo Pal

== Ancestry ==
Ancestors of Zhenjin

8. Genghis Khan, Mongol Emperor
4. Tolui
9. Börte
2. Kublai Khan, Emperor of the Yuan Dynasty
10. Jakha Gambu of the Keraites
5. Sorghaghtani Beki
1. Zhenjin, Crown Prince of the Yuan Dynasty
6. Anchen Noyan
3. Chabi Khatun

== In popular culture ==
- "Prince Chinkin" is a central character in the 1982 American-Italian miniseries Marco Polo, where he was portrayed by actor Junichi Ishida. In this film, he is depicted as suffering from epilepsy.
- "Prince Jingim" is also a main character of the 2014 Netflix original series Marco Polo, where he is portrayed by Remy Hii.
