= List of emperors of the Yuan dynasty =

Emperor of the Yuan dynasty
- 大元皇帝
- Imperial
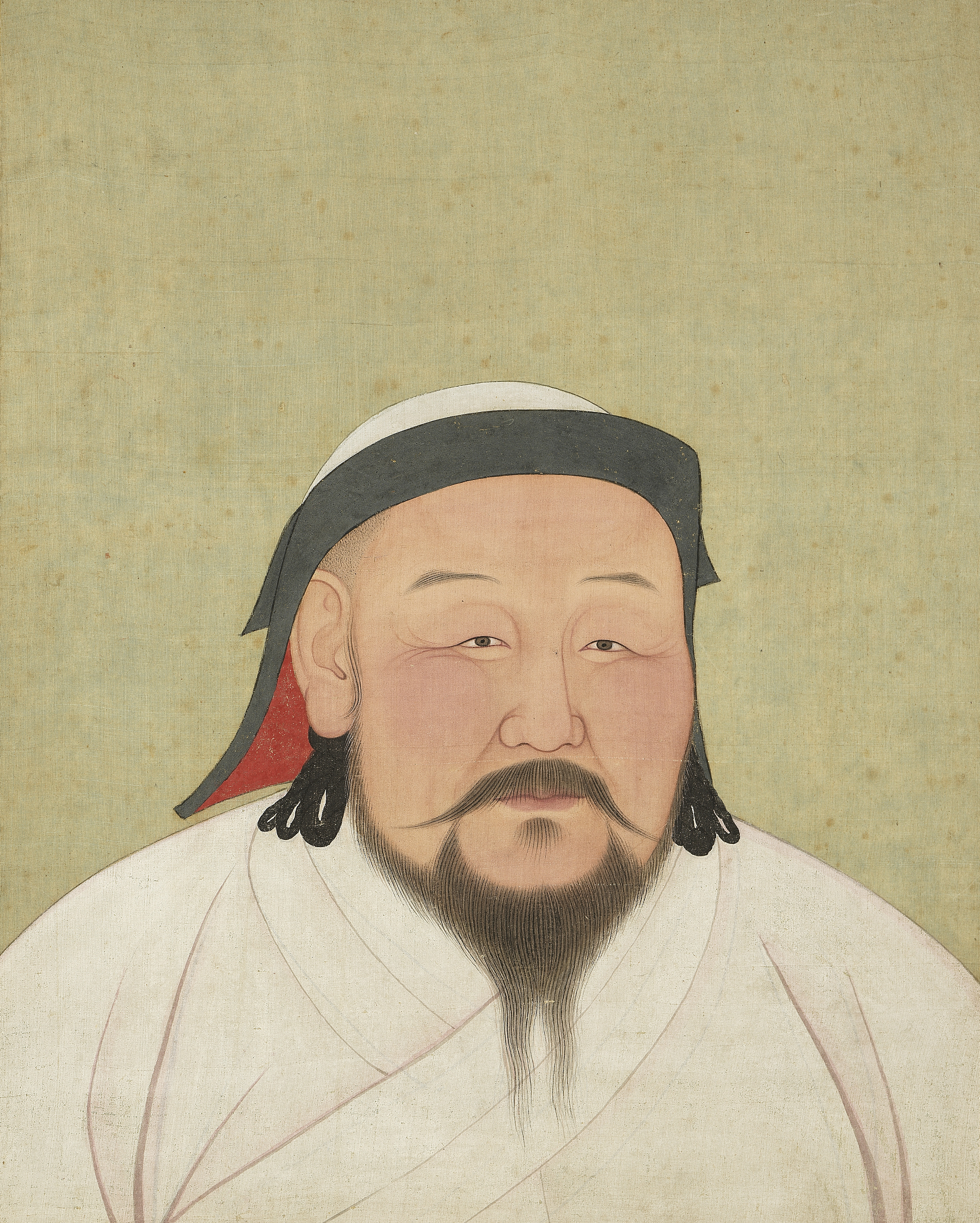
- Kublai Khan (r. 1260–1294), the grandson of Genghis Khan, proclaimed the Yuan dynasty in 1271.

Details
- Style: Khagan; Huangdi
- First monarch: Genghis Khan (Mongol Empire); Kublai Khan (Yuan dynasty)
- Last monarch: Toghon Temür
- Formed: 1206 (Mongol Empire); 1271 (Yuan dynasty)
- Abolished: 1368
- Residences: Karakorum; Khanbaliq
- Appointer: Hereditary

The Yuan dynasty was an imperial dynasty of China, proclaimed on 18 December 1271 by Kublai Khan, which succeeded the Song dynasty and preceded the Ming dynasty. It also functioned as a continuation of the Mongol Empire, which was founded by Genghis Khan in 1206, but which subsequently split into four autonomous states. The emperors of the Yuan dynasty thus comprise both Kublai's successors as rulers of China and his predecessors up to his grandfather Genghis, who was retrospectively presented as the founder of the dynasty.

The rulers of the Yuan dynasty were nominally superior to those of the other three post-Mongol states, but each was de facto independent of the others and occupied with their own territories. The Yuan dynasty adopted Han political traditions, including the use of posthumous names, temple names and era names. Aside from the title of emperor, Yuan rulers also concurrently held the title of khagan.

Although the reigns of Kublai and his successor Temür were generally peaceful, weaknesses in the Yuan administration became apparent and led to a gradual breakdown of political stability. By the mid-14th century, the Yuan state became impossible to govern, and in 1368 the last emperor, Toghon Temür, was forced to flee China proper. His descendants continued to rule a rump state in Inner Mongolia, known as the Northern Yuan, until 1634.

== Background ==
Through years of campaigning, Genghis Khan (c. 1162 – 1227) unified the tribes of the Mongolian steppe and was crowned khan of the Mongol Empire, or Yeke Monggol Ulus, in 1206. The campaigns of the following decades saw Mongol armies invade and conquer China, Central Asia, Persia and much of the Middle East, and Russia. However, different branches of Genghis Khan's line became dominant in differing areas. As a result, by 1265, the once-united empire had begun to split into four independent states: the Golden Horde in modern-day Russia, the Chagatai Khanate in Central Asia, the Ilkhanate in the Near East, and a regime in China which was ruled by Genghis's grandson Kublai Khan and which was nominally superior to the rest.

To appeal to the Han Chinese-majority population of his empire in China, Kublai portrayed himself as an emperor based on Chinese principles and declared the foundation of a new imperial dynasty titled Da Yuan (Great Yuan), essentially a way to express Yeke Monggol Ulus (Great Mongol Empire) in Chinese terms. The Great Yuan was officially proclaimed on 18 December 1271. The Yuan dynasty was regarded by the early Ming dynasty editors of the History of Yuan as synonymous with the Mongol Empire, so they retroactively described Genghis Khan as the dynastic founder and his coronation in 1206 as the beginning of the dynasty; (Note: An alternative view, favoured by some later Chinese historians, places its foundation in 1279 with the fall of the Southern Song dynasty.) the post-1271 emperors styled themselves as the Emperor of China (Huangdi) in addition to Mongol khans. In Chinese historical texts, emperors of the Yuan dynasty, along with the Tang and Song dynasties, are referred to by their temple names; they also had posthumous names and normally multiple era names.

Kublai presided over the final conquest of the Song dynasty, which had preceded the Yuan. Although his reign was generally long and prosperous, weaknesses in the Yuan's economy, society, and administration became apparent after the death of his successor Temür in 1307, culminating in two decades of near-anarchy between 1320 and 1340. Although the emperor Toghon Temür then managed to set up a stable government, an economic crisis led to a breakdown of the social order, and the powerful warlord Zhu Yuanzhang, having forced Toghon Temür to flee, established the Ming dynasty in 1368. Members of the Yuan dynasty continued to rule a rump state in the Mongol heartland, commonly known as the Northern Yuan, until 1634.

== List of rulers ==
shading, with (regency) in the "Reign" column, denotes regents between crowned rulers.

Yuan dynasty (大元; 1271–1368)
Portrait	Khan name	Personal name	Reign	Succession	Life details
Genghis Khan	Genghis Khan 成吉思汗 Other names: Temple name: Taizu (太祖) Posthumous name: Emperor Fatian Qiyun Shengwu (法天啟運聖武皇帝)	Temüjin 鐵木真	1206 – 25 August 1227 (20–21 years)	Son of Yesugei and Hö'elün	c. 1162 – 25 August 1227 (Note: The year of Genghis Khan's birth is not certain; while 1162 is most likely, 1155 and 1167 have also been proposed. For a fuller discussion, see Genghis Khan#Birth and childhood.) (aged around 65) Unified the Mongol tribes, founded the Mongol Empire in 1206, initiated the Mongol conquests. Died in uncertain circumstances.
Tolui	None, known by his personal name Other names: Temple name: Ruizong (睿宗) Posthumous name: Emperor Yingwu (英武皇帝) (conferred in 1251) Emperor Jingxiang (景襄皇帝) (conferred in 1265)	Tolui 拖雷	1227 – 1229 (1–2 years) (regency)	Fourth son of Genghis	c. 1191 – September/October 1231 (aged around 40) Commanded armies in Central Asia and in China, and was a candidate to succeed his father as khan. Died in controversial circumstances.
Ögedei Khan	None, known by his personal name Other names: Temple name: Taizong (太宗) Posthumous name: Emperor Yingwen (英文皇帝)	Ögedei Khan 窝阔台	13 September 1229 – 11 December 1241 (12 years, 2 months and 28 days)	Third son of Genghis	1186 – 11 December 1241 (aged 55) Presided over the conquests of the Jin dynasty and Kievan Rus' and the invasion of Europe, refined the imperial administration, and built Karakorum as a capital city. Died from excessive drinking.
	None, known by her personal name Other names: Temple name: Naimaĵin (乃馬真后)	Töregene Khatun 脱列哥那	1242 – 1246 (3–4 years) (regency)	Wife of Ögedei	Late 1180s – late 1246 Her five-year regency on behalf of her son Güyük was noted for its political intrigues and her excessive taxation demands, but after it ended she quickly lost influence and died. (Note: The historian Qiu Yihao has suggested that Töregene lived much longer and assumed the regency again after Güyük's death.)
Güyük Khan	None, known by his personal name Other names: Temple name: Dingzong (定宗) Posthumous name: Emperor Jianping (簡平皇帝)	Güyük Khan 贵由	24 August 1246 – April 1248 (1 year, 7 months)	Son of Ögedei and Töregene	1206 – April 1248 (aged 41–42) Reversed his mother's economic policies and removed her associates from power; quarrelled with his cousin Batu and may have intended to campaign against him. Died of ill health.
	None, known by her personal name	Oghul Qaimish 斡兀立海迷失	1248 – 1251 (2–3 years) (regency)	Wife of Güyük	Early 1200s – summer 1252 (aged around 50) An ineffective regent, she was outflanked by her political enemies who proclaimed Tolui's son Möngke as khan. After a coup attempt led by her sons failed, she was judged complicit and guilty of witchcraft, and executed.
Möngke Khan	None, known by his personal name Other names: Temple name: Xianzong (憲宗) Posthumous name: Emperor Huansu (桓肅皇帝)	Möngke Khan 蒙哥	1 July 1251 – 11 August 1259 (8 years, 1 month and 10 days)	First son of Tolui	10 January 1209 – 11 August 1259 (aged 50) Purged those who had opposed his accession in the Toluid Revolution; sent his brother Hulegu to campaign in the Middle East, and himself led the invasion of the Song dynasty, during which he died of fever.
Kublai Khan	Setsen Khan 薛禪汗 better known as Kublai Khan Other names: Temple name: Shizu (世祖) Posthumous name: Emperor Shengde Shengong Wenwu (聖德神功文武皇帝)	Borjigin Kublai 孛兒只斤忽必烈	5 May 1260 – 18 February 1294 (22 years and 2 months) Era(s): Zhongtong (中統) 26 June 1260 – 6 September 1264; Zhiyuan (至元) 7 September 1264 – 18 February 1294	Second son of Tolui	23 September 1215 – 18 February 1294 (aged 78) Established the Yuan dynasty in 1271, completed the conquest of the Song dynasty, won the Toluid Civil War, and moved the capital to Khanbaliq. Died of natural causes.
Öljeytü Khan	Öljeytü Khan 完澤篤汗 Other names: Temple name: Chengzong (成宗) Posthumous name: Emperor Qinming Guangxiao (欽明廣孝皇帝)	Borjigin Temür 孛兒只斤鐵穆耳	10 May 1294 – 10 February 1307 (12 years and 9 months) Era(s): Yuanzhen (元貞) 17 January 1295 – 20 March 1297; Dade (大德) 21 March 1297 – 10 February 1307	Grandson of Kublai	15 October 1265 – 10 February 1307 (aged 41) His reign was prosperous yet conservative, implementing policies intended to ensure stability, but he failed to resolve increasing ineffiency in the Yuan administration. Died of natural causes.
Külüg Khan	Külüg Khan 曲律汗 Other names: Temple name: Wuzong (武宗) Posthumous name: Emperor Renhui Xuanxiao (仁惠宣孝皇帝)	Borjigin Haishan 孛兒只斤海山	21 June 1307 – 27 January 1311 (3 years, 7 months and 6 days) Era(s): Zhida (至大) 23 January 1308 – 27 January 1311	Great-grandson of Kublai	4 August 1281 – 27 January 1311 (aged 29) Disregarded established systems, rapidly expanded the bureaucracy, and caused immense fiscal difficulties. Died of natural causes.
Buyantu Khan	Buyantu Khan 普顏篤汗 Other names: Temple name: Renzong (仁宗) Posthumous name: Emperor Shengwen Qinxiao (聖文欽孝皇帝)	Borjigin Ayurbarwada 孛兒只斤愛育黎拔力八達	7 April 1311 – 1 March 1320 (8 years, 10 months and 23 days) Era(s): Huangqing (皇慶) 7 April 1311 – 6 February 1314; Yanyou (延祐) 7 February 1314 – 1 March 1320	Brother of Külüg	9 April 1285 – 1 March 1320 (aged 34) Reversed most of his brother's policies, reintroduced the Confucian examination system, and codified laws, but failed to restore fiscal order and was undermined by factional struggles. Died of natural causes.
	Gegeen Khan 格堅汗 Other names: Temple name: Yingzong (英宗) Posthumous name: Emperor Ruisheng Wenxiao (睿聖文孝皇帝)	Borjigin Shidibala 孛兒只斤硕德八剌	19 April 1320 – 4 September 1323 (3 years, 4 months and 16 days) Era(s): Zhizhi (至治) 30 December 1320 – 4 September 1323	Son of Ayurbarwada	22 February 1302 – 4 September 1323 (aged 21) Attempted to reduce the power of the minister Temuder and instituted monetary reforms after the latter's death, but was killed in a coup by Temuder's supporters.
	None, known either by his personal or era name	Borjigin Yesün Temür 孛兒只斤也孫鐵木兒	4 October 1323 – 15 August 1328 (4 years, 10 months and 11 days) Era(s): Taiding (泰定) 3 January 1324 – 6 May 1328; Zhihe (致和) 7 May 1328 – 15 August 1328	Great-Grandson of Kublai	28 November 1293 – 15 August 1328 (Note: Some uncertainty surrounds his birth and death dates.) (aged 34) Acceded through assassination but achieved stability by purging those who had brought him to power; restored religious impartiality in the administration. Died of natural causes.
	None, known either by his personal or era name	Borjigin Ragibagh 孛兒只斤阿剌吉八	October 1328 – 14 November 1328 (1 month) Era(s): Tianshun (天順) October 1328 – 14 November 1328	Son of Yesün	1320 – 14 November 1328 (aged 8) Child emperor; probably murdered amid the War of the Two Capitals.
Jayaatu Khan	Jayaatu Khan 札牙篤汗 Other names: Temple name: Wenzong (文宗) Posthumous name: Emperor Shengming Yuanxiao (聖明元孝皇帝)	Borjigin Tugh Temür 孛兒只斤圖帖睦爾	16 October 1328 – 26 February 1329 (4 months and 10 days) Era(s): Tianli (天曆) 16 October 1328 – 26 February 1329	Son of Külüg	16 February 1304 – 2 September 1332 (aged 28) Abdicated in favor of his brother Khutughtu Khan.
Khutughtu Khan	Khutughtu Khan 忽都篤汗 Other names: Temple name: Mingzong (明宗) Posthumous name: Emperor Yixian Jingxiao (翼獻景孝皇帝)	Borjigin Kusala 孛兒只斤和世剌	27 February 1329 – 30 August 1329 (6 months and 3 days) Era(s): Tianli (天曆) 27 February 1329 – 30 August 1329	Son of Külüg	22 December 1300 – 30 August 1329 (aged 28) Briefly ruled before being killed by El Temür.
Jayaatu Khan	Jayaatu Khan 札牙篤汗 (second reign)	Borjigin Tugh Temür 孛兒只斤圖帖睦爾	8 September 1329 – 2 September 1332 (2 years, 11 months and 25 days) Era(s): Zhishun (至順) 25 May 1330 – 2 September 1332	Son of Külüg	16 February 1304 – 2 September 1332 (aged 28) A patron of the arts and scholarship, his reign was dominated by the ministers El Temür and Bayan of the Merkid. Died of natural causes.
Borjigin Rinchinbal	None, known by his personal name Other names: Temple name: Ningzong (寧宗) Posthumous name: Emperor Chongsheng Sixiao (沖聖嗣孝皇帝)	Borjigin Rinchinbal 孛兒只斤懿璘質班	23 October 1332 – 14 December 1332 (1 month and 21 days) Era(s): Zhishun (至順) 23 October 1332 – 14 December 1332	Son of Khutughtu	1 May 1326 – 14 December 1332 (aged 6) Child emperor; died of sudden illness.
	Ukhaghatu Khan 烏哈噶圖汗 Other names: Temple name: Huizong (惠宗) Posthumous name: Emperor Shun (順皇帝) (Note: Ukhaghatu Khan's posthumous name was given by the Ming court.)	Borjigin Toghon Temür 孛兒只斤妥懽帖睦爾	19 July 1333 – 10 September 1368 (35 years, 2 months and 22 days) Era(s): Yuantong (元統) 15 November 1333 – 7 December 1335; Zhiyuan (至元) 8 December 1335 – 17 January 1341; Zhizheng (至正) 18 January 1341 – 10 September 1368	Son of Khutughtu	25 May 1320 – 23 May 1370 (aged 49) Restored stable government, but an economic crisis led to a breakdown of the social order; was forced to flee to Karakorum in 1368 by the warlord Zhu Yuanzhang, and founded the Northern Yuan dynasty in Inner Mongolia. Died of natural causes.

== See also ==
- Yuan dynasty family tree
- List of Northern Yuan khans
- List of empresses consort of the Yuan dynasty
- List of Chinese monarchs
- List of Mongol rulers
