= Kökejin =

Mongolian empress dowager (d. 1300/1)

- Empress dowager of Mongolia
- Empress dowager: 1294-1300/1
- Died: 1 March 1300
- Spouse: Zhenjin
- Issue: Darmabala; Temür Khan
Posthumous name
- Huiren yusheng huanghou
- Clan: Khongirad
- Dynasty: Yuan

Kökejin Khatun (also called Bairam-Egechi, d. 1300/1) was a Mongolian empress dowager. A powerful political player, she is credited with securing the throne for her son Temür.

== Early life ==
Kökejin came from the Khunggirad tribe. She was selected as a wife for the crown prince Chingkim by his father, Kublai Khan, who had rejected several candidates before Kökejin was suggested by one of his ministers. According to the fourteenth-century History of Yuan, Kublai had first come across her while he was out on a hunting trip and was impressed by her virtue when she asked him to wait for her parents to return before she could offer him mare's milk to drink.

She became Chingkim's principal wife, taking the title Bairam-Egechi. According to the History of Yuan, Kublai appreciated Kökejin’s filial piety, especially towards her mother-in-law Chabi.

Kökejin and Chingkim had three sons: Kammala, who was raised by his grandmother; Dharmapala, who died in 1292; and Temür. Chingkim died in 1285.

== Political influence ==
Kublai Khan valued Kökejin's intelligence and advice.

During the succession struggles after the death of Khublai Khan in February 1294, Kökejin led a faction in favour of her son Temür inheriting the throne. After sending for Temür to inform him of Kublai Khan's death, Kökejin administered the affairs of the realm herself until his return. Along with her supporters, including the general Bayan of the Baarin, Kökejin managed to gain control of the government and have Temür pronounced khan at a council (qurultai) in April 1294.

According to the contemporary historian Rashid al-Din, Kökejin settled the matter at the council by suggesting that her sons Kammala and Temür recite the maxims of Chinggis Khan. This inclined the spectators in favour of Temür, who recited them fluently.

Kökejin continued to be influential during Temür's rein. He gave her the title of empress dowager and appointed her a household retinue.

After persuading Kammala to return to his post protecting the northern border of the empire, Kökejin also took an active role in heading off a challenge from the Muslim forces of Prince Ananda, another grandson of Kublai Khan. She dissuaded Temür from getting involved with the Kaidu war in 1300.

== Personal life ==
Kökejin dissuaded her brother from taking a government post and turned down a gift of land which she said belonged to the nation. She dismissed her officials who had accepted the land.

Kökejin was a patron of Buddhism. She made a pilgrimage to Mount Wutai in 1296 and made a large donation to the Great Monastery of Myriad Sacred Beings there, and commissioned the printing of Tibetan Buddhist texts.

She received the posthumous title Huiren yusheng huanghou.
