= Nambui =

Empress consort of the Yuan dynasty and Khatun of Mongols
- Tenure: 1283–1290
- Predecessor: Empress Chabi
- Successor: Empress Shirindari
- Spouse: Kublai Khan
- Clan: Khongirad
- Father: Nachen Küregen

Nambui (Mongolian: Намбуй хатан,ᠨᠠᠮᠪᠢ; Chinese: 南必皇后, fl. 1294) was a Khongirad empress consort of the Yuan dynasty. She was married to Kublai Khan after the death of his second wife Chabi.

== Biography ==
Her birthdate is unknown. She was a daughter of Nachen Küregen from Khongirad, brother of Chabi. She was married to Kublai in 1283 after the death of Chabi in 1281. After his principal wife's death, Kublai started to live in Nambui's ordo, admitted only a very limited circle of people, and his ministers had to submit reports and reports to the khan through Nambui. According to some sources, in the last years of his reign, Kublai even allowed Nambui to issue important decrees on his behalf, but there are no concrete examples to prove this. Nambui had a son with Kublai called Temechi, who was Kublai's youngest son. She went missing in 1294 with Temechi.

Preceded by Chabi	Empress of the Yuan dynasty 1283–1294	Succeeded by Shirindari
