= Khutughtu Khan Kusala =

13th Khagan of the Mongol Empire

Emperor Mingzong of Yuan 元明宗 Khutughtu Khan 忽都篤汗 ᠬᠤᠲᠤᠭᠲᠤ ᠬᠠᠭᠠᠨ
- 13th Khagan of the Mongol Empire (Nominal due to the empire's division); Emperor of China (9th Emperor of the Yuan dynasty)
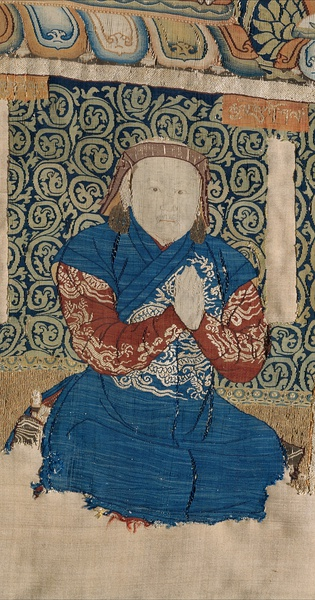
- Depiction from the Vajrabhairava Mandala, c. 1330–1332

Emperor of the Yuan dynasty
- Reign: 27 February 1329 – 30 August 1329
- Coronation: 27 February 1329
- Predecessor: Jayaatu Khan Tugh Temür (first reign)
- Successor: Jayaatu Khan Tugh Temür (restored)
- Born: 22 December 1300; Dalanzadgad, Yuan dynasty
- Died: 30 August 1329 (aged 28); Onggachatu, Yuan dynasty
- Burial: Tomb of Genghis Khan
- Empress: Empress Mailaiti of Karluks (m. 1317–1329); Empress Babusha of Naiman (m. 1320–1329)
- Issue: Toghon Temür; Rinchinbal Khan; Budashini
Names
- Mongolian: ᠬᠥᠰᠯᠡᠨ; Chinese: 和世㻋; Kusalaa/ Küsala(an)
Era dates
- Tianli (天曆; "Heavenly Calendar", 1329)
Regnal name
- Emperor Shuntian Lidao Ruiwen Zhiwu Dasheng Xiao (順天立道睿文智武大聖孝皇帝); Khutughtu Khan (ᠬᠤᠲᠤᠭᠲᠤ ᠬᠠᠭᠠᠨ; 忽都篤汗)
Posthumous name
- Emperor Yixian Jingxiao (翼獻景孝皇帝)
Temple name
- Mingzong (明宗)
- House: Borjigin
- Dynasty: Yuan
- Father: Külüg Khan

Khutughtu Khan (Note: Mongolian: Хутагт Хаан, romanized: Khutagt Khaan, pronounced [χʊ́tʰəχtʰ χaːɴ]; Classical Mongolian: ᠬᠤᠲᠤᠭᠲᠤ [ˈqʰutuɣtu]; Chinese: 忽都篤汗; pinyin: Hūdōudǔ Hàn) (born Khüslen; (Note: Mongolian: Хүслэн [xúsɮɪɴ]; Classical Mongolian: ᠬᠥᠰᠯᠡᠨ [ˈkʰøslen]; Chinese: 和世剌; pinyin: Héshìlà; Sanskrit: कुशल, romanized: Kuśala; lit. 'virtuous, wholesome') 22 December 1300 – 30 August 1329), also known by his temple name as the Emperor Mingzong of Yuan, (Note: Chinese: 元明宗; pinyin: Yuán míngzōng) was a son of Khayishan (Emperor Wuzong) who seized the throne of the Yuan dynasty of China in 1329, but died in suspicious circumstances six months later. Apart from the Emperor of China, he is considered as the 13th Great Khan of the Mongol Empire, although it was only nominal due to the division of the empire.

== Early life and exile ==
Kusala was the eldest son of Khayishan (Külüg Khan or Emperor Wuzong) and a Mongol-Ikhires woman. Due to the unstable balance present in the Khayishan administration with the tense rivalry between Khayishan, his younger brother Ayurbarwada and their mother Dagi of the Khongirad clan, Khayishan appointed Ayurbarwada as Crown Prince on the condition that he would pass the status to Kusala after succession.

However, after Khayishan's death, Ayurbarwada succeeded to the throne in 1311. In 1320, Dagi, Temüder and other members of the Khongirad faction installed Ayurbarwada's son Shidebala as the new ruler instead of Kusala, due to the knowledge of Kusala coming from an Ikhires background, rather than the more noble Khongirad lineage.

To ensure Shidebala's succession, Kusala was rewarded with the title of king of Chou and relegated to Yunnan in 1316; but fled to Esen Bukha-ruled Chagatai Khanate in Central Asia, as a pro-Khayishan official advised, after a failed revolt in Shaanxi. When the Chagatayid Khan Esen Bukha heard that Kusala was living near his realm, he came to greet him. After that, Kusala was backed by the Chagatayid princes. While in exile in Central Asia, he married Mailaiti, a daughter of Temuder of the Qarluq.

== Brief accession and sudden death ==
Although the rival faction was purged by Yesün Temür Khan (Emperor Taiding) when Shidibala Khan (Emperor Yingzong) was assassinated, he remained in Central Asia. He extended his influence in his stronghold, which was located to the west of Altai Mountains.

In 1328, when Yesün Temür Khan died, a civil war known as the War of the Two Capitals erupted between Shangdu-based Ragibagh and Dadu-based Tugh Temür. The former was a son of Yesün Temür and was backed up the former Yesün Temür administration led by Dawlat Shah, and the latter was Kuśala's younger brother who was supported by the former Khayishan faction led by the Qipchaq commander El Temür and the Merkit commander Bayan, a governor in Henan. This ended in the victory of Tugh Temür since he secured support from most of the princes, aristocrats and warlords in the south of the Gobi Desert. Tugh Temür summoned his brother to come to Dadu.

At the same time, Kuśala, with support from the Chaghadayid leaders Eljigidey and Duwa Temür, entered Mongolia from the Tarbagatai region (in the Khangai Mountains). He also got support from princes and generals of Mongolia, and with overwhelming military power in the background, put pressure on Tugh Temür, who had already ascended the throne. Kuśala enthroned himself on 27 February 1329, north of Karakorum.

Tugh Temür abdicated on 3 April 1329, and a month later El Temür brought the imperial seal to Kuśala in Mongolia, announcing Dadu's intent to welcome him. Kuśala responded by making Tugh Temür his heir apparent on 15 May. Kuśala had proceeded to appoint his own loyal followers to important posts in the Secretariat, the Bureau of Military Affairs, and the Censorate.

Taking 1,800 men with him, Kuśala set out for Dadu. On 26 August, he met with Tugh Temür in Ongghuchad (Onggachatu), where Tugh Temur had built the city of Zhongdu. He suddenly died only 4 days after a banquet with Tugh Temür. The Yuan shi states that the luckless Kuśala Khan died of violence. It seems that Kuśala was poisoned by El Temür, who feared losing power to princes and officers of the Chagatai Khanate and Mongolia, who followed Kuśala. Tugh Temür was restored to the throne on 8 September.

== Family ==
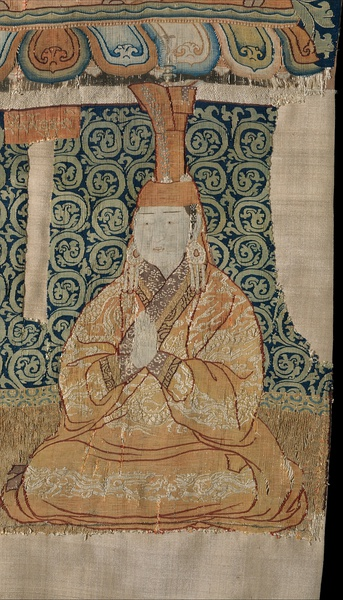
Babusha Khatun

Khutughtu Khan had two wives who were Mailaiti, a descendant of the famous Qarluq chief, Arslan, who submitted to Genghis Khan and Babusha of the Naiman. They gave birth to two Mongol emperors, including Toghon Temür, the last Mongolian emperor to rule China.

- Parents:
  - Külüg, Emperor Wuzong of Yuan (武宗 曲律汗; 4 August 1281 – 27 January 1311)
  - Concubine Shoutong (寿童妃子)
- Wives and children:
  - Empress Zhenyuhuisheng of Karluks (貞裕徽聖皇后 罕禄鲁氏; d. 1320), personal name Mailaiti (迈来迪)
    - Budaxini, Princess Minghui of Zhenyi (不答昔你 明慧貞懿公主), 2nd daughter
    - Toghon Temür, Emperor Huizong (惠宗 妥懽帖睦爾; 25 May 1320 – 23 May 1370), first son
  - Empress Anchuhan (按出罕皇后)
  - Empress Yuelusha (月魯沙皇后)
    - Yuelu, Grand Princess of Chang State (月魯昌国公主), 1st daughter
  - Empress Buyanhuludou (不顏忽鲁都皇后)
  - Empress Yesu (野蘇皇后)
  - Empress Tuohusi (脱忽思皇后)
  - Empress Babusha, of Naiman Borjigit clan (八不沙皇后; d. 1330)
    - Rinchinbal, Prince of Fu (鄜王懿璘质班; 1 May 1326 – 14 December 1332), second son

== See also ==
- List of Yuan emperors
- List of Mongol rulers
- List of Chinese monarchs

== Notes ==
Khutughtu Khan Kusala House of Borjigin Born: 22 December 1300 Died: 30 August 1329
Regnal titles
Preceded by Jayaatu Khan, Emperor Wenzong	Great Khan of the Mongol Empire (Nominal due to the empire's division); 1329	Succeeded by Rinchinbal Khan, Emperor Ningzong of Yuan
Preceded by Jayaatu Khan, Emperor Wenzong	Emperor of the Yuan dynasty Emperor of China; 1329	Succeeded by Rinchinbal Khan, Emperor Ningzong of Yuan
