= Rinchinbal Khan =

Emperor of Yuan dynasty in 1332

Emperor Ningzong of Yuan 元寧宗 ᠡᠷᠳᠡᠨᠢᠴᠣᠭᠲᠤ ᠬᠠᠭᠠᠨ
- 14th Khagan of the Mongol Empire (Nominal due to the empire's division); Emperor of China (10th Emperor of the Yuan dynasty)
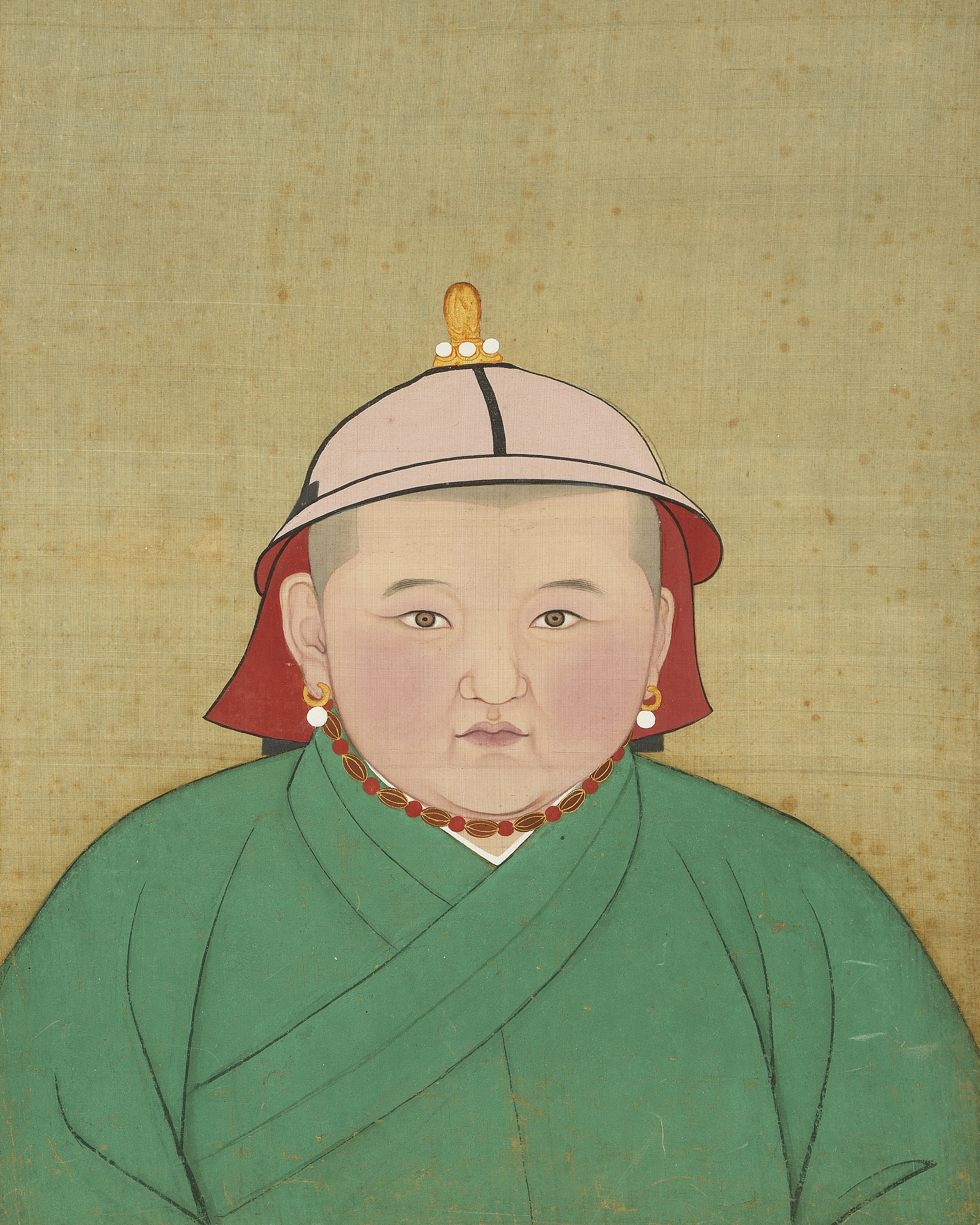
- Portrait of Rinchinbal Khan, Emperor Ningzong of Yuan

Emperor of the Yuan dynasty
- Reign: October 23, 1332 – December 14, 1332
- Coronation: October 23, 1332
- Predecessor: Jayaatu Khan Tugh Temür
- Successor: Ukhaghatu Khan Toghon Temür
- Born: May 1, 1326
- Died: December 14, 1332 (aged 6); Dadu, Yuan dynasty
- Empress: Empress Daritemish of Khongirad clan (m. 1332–1332)
Names
- Mongolian: ᠷᠢᠨᠴᠢᠨᠪᠠᠯ; Chinese: 懿璘質班; Rinchinbal
Era dates
- Zhishun (至順) 1332
Posthumous name
- Emperor Chongsheng Sixiao (沖聖嗣孝皇帝)
Temple name
- Ningzong (寧宗)
- House: Borjigin
- Dynasty: Yuan
- Father: Khutughtu Khan Kusala
- Mother: Babusha

Rinchinbal (Mongolian: Ринчин Бал ᠷᠢᠨᠴᠢᠨᠪᠠᠯ, Chinese: 懿璘質班; Standard Tibetan: རིན་ཆེན་དཔལ།), also known by his temple name as the Emperor Ningzong of Yuan (Chinese: 元寧宗; May 1, 1326 – December 14, 1332), was a son of Kuśala (Emperor Mingzong) who was briefly installed to the throne of the Yuan dynasty, but as a young boy he died within two months after being installed to the throne. Apart from Emperor of China, he is also considered the 14th Great Khan of the Mongol Empire, although it was only nominal due to the division of the empire.

== Biography ==
He was the second son of Kuśala (Emperor Mingzong) and a younger brother of Toghun Temür (Emperor Huizong). His mother was Babusha of the Naiman tribe, who met Kusala when he lived in exile in Central Asia under the Chagatai Khanate.

When his father Kuśala died and was succeeded by his younger brother Tugh Temür (who is thought to have poisoned Kuśala), Rinchinbal was appointed to Prince of Fu. Tugh Temur made his son Aratnadara heir apparent in January 1331. In order to secure her son's throne, Tugh Temur's Khatun Budashiri executed Rinchinbal's mother, Babusha, and exiled Toghan Temur to Korea. These proved unnecessary, however, Aratnadara died one month after his designation as heir.

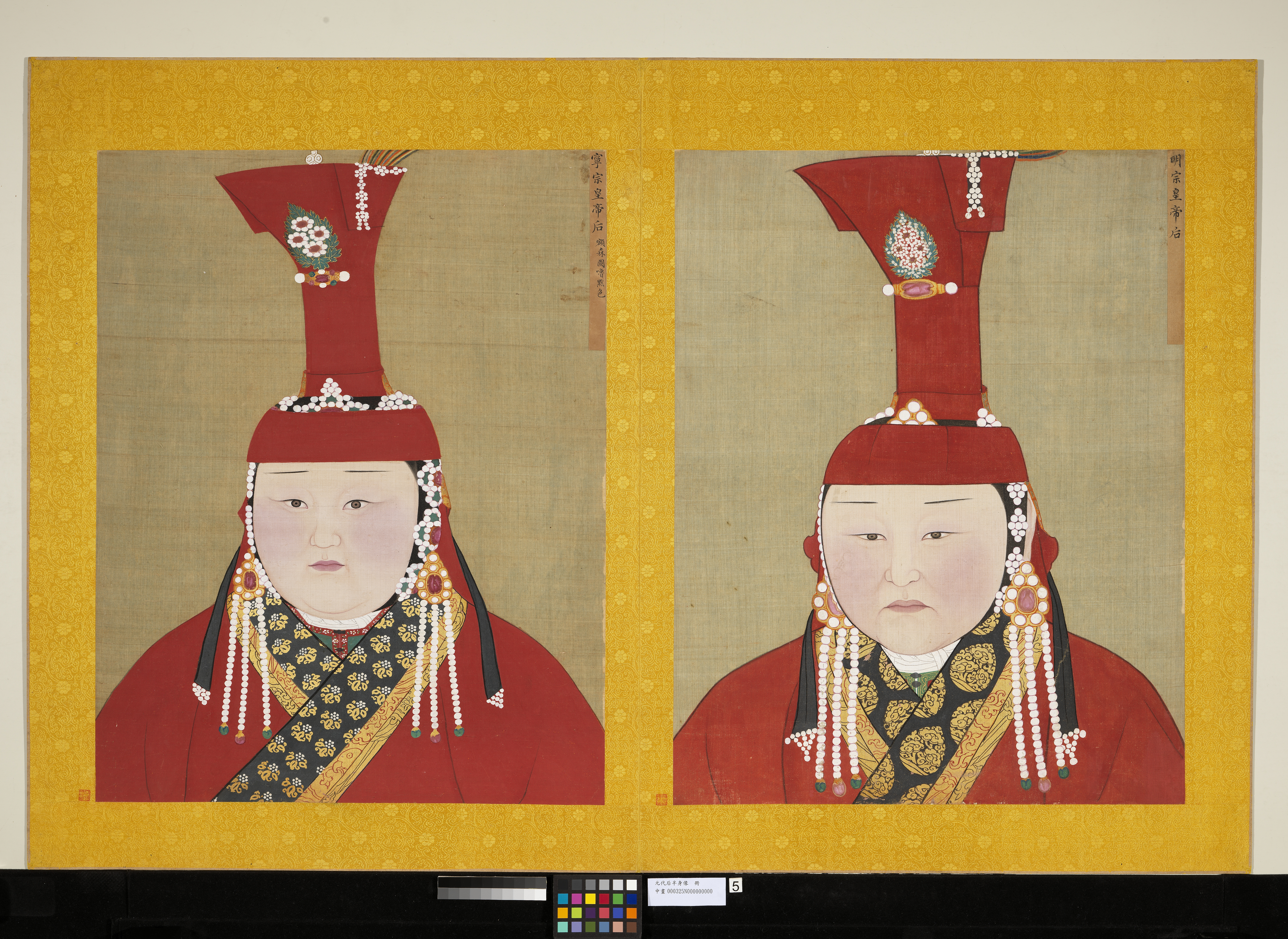
Rinchinbal's consort and mother.

Although Tugh Temür had a son named El Tegüs when he died in 1332, it is said that on his deathbed the Khagan expressed remorse for what he had done to his elder brother and his intention to pass the throne to Toghan Temur, Kusala's eldest son, instead of his own son. The grand councilor El Temür resisted letting Kuśala's eldest son Toghun Temür accede to the throne since he was suspected of having poisoned his father Kuśala. When Tugh Temur's widow and El Tegüs's mother Budashiri Khatun respected Tugh Temür's will of making Kuśala's son succeed the throne, the 6 year old Rinchinbal was chosen. While Toghun Temür was kept far away from the capital Dadu, Rinchinbal was in Dadu and had become favored by Tugh Temür. Rinchinbal was enthroned as the new emperor on October 23, 1332, but he died on December 14.

El Temür again asked Budashiri to install El Tegüs but it was declined again. He had no choice but to invite Toghun Temür back from far-away Guangxi in southwest China.

== See also ==
- List of emperors of the Yuan dynasty
- List of Mongol rulers

Rinchinbal Khan House of Borjigin Born: 1326 Died: 1332
Regnal titles
Preceded by Jayaatu Khan, Emperor Wenzong	Great Khan of the Mongol Empire (Nominal due to the empire's division); 1332	Succeeded by Ukhaatu Khan, Emperor Huizong
Preceded by Jayaatu Khan, Emperor Wenzong	Emperor of the Yuan dynasty Emperor of China; 1332	Succeeded by Ukhaatu Khan, Emperor Huizong
