= Gegeen Khan =

Emperor of Yuan Dynasty from 1320 to 1323

Emperor Yingzong of Yuan 元英宗 Gegeen Khan 格堅汗 ᠭᠡᠭᠡᠨ ᠬᠠᠭᠠᠨ
- 9th Khagan of the Mongol Empire (Nominal due to the empire's division); Emperor of China (5th Emperor of the Yuan dynasty)
- Gegeen Khan in 14th century portrait

Emperor of the Yuan dynasty
- Reign: April 19, 1320 – September 4, 1323
- Coronation: April 19, 1320
- Predecessor: Ayurbarwada Buyantu Khan
- Successor: Yesün Temür
- Born: February 22, 1302
- Died: September 4, 1323 (aged 21); Nanpo, Yuan China
- Empress: Empress Sugabal of Ikires clan (m.?–1323)
Names
- Mongolian:ᠰᠢᠳᠡᠪᠠᠯᠠ; Chinese: 碩德八剌; Shidebala
Full name
- Given name: Shidebala
Era dates
- Zhizhi (至治) 1321–1323
Regnal name
- Emperor Jitian Tidao Jingwen Renwu Dazhao Xiao (繼天體道敬文仁武大昭孝皇帝); Gegeen Khan (ᠭᠡᠭᠡᠨ ᠬᠠᠭᠠᠨ; 格堅汗)
Posthumous name
- Emperor Ruisheng Wenxiao (睿聖文孝皇帝)
Temple name
- Yingzong (英宗)
- House: Borjigin
- Dynasty: Yuan
- Father: Ayurbarwada Buyantu Khan
- Mother: Radnashiri of the Khunggirat

Gegeen Khan (Mongolian: Гэгээн Хаан; Mongol script: ᠭᠡᠭᠡᠨ ᠬᠠᠭᠠᠨ; Shidebal Gegegen Qaγan; Chinese: 格堅汗), born Shidibala (ᠰᠢᠳᠡᠪᠠᠯᠠ; 碩德八剌), also known by his temple name as the Emperor Yingzong of Yuan (Chinese: 元英宗; February 22, 1302 – September 4, 1323), was an emperor of the Yuan dynasty. Apart from Emperor of China, he is regarded as the ninth Great Khan of the Mongol Empire, although it was only nominal due to the division of the empire. His personal name "Shidibala" was termed from Sanskrit Siddhipāla (सिद्धिपाल) meaning 'protector of the advanced state of supernatural perfection' (referring to the Buddhist concept of Siddhi) and his regnal name "Gegeen Khan" means "enlightened/bright khan" in the Mongolian language.

Early in his short reign, the Khunggirat faction played a key role in the Yuan court. When his grandmother Dagi (Targi) and the grand councillor Temuder died in 1322, his opponents seemed to have triumphed. Despite the Emperor's aim to reform the government based on the Confucian principles, Temuder's faction linked up with the Alan guard and assassinated the emperor in 1323. This was the first violent transition struggle in the Yuan dynasty's history, which is also known as the Coup d'état at Nanpo (南坡之變), that an emperor was overthrown by a group led by a non-Borjigin.

== Peaceful succession ==
Prince Shidibala was the eldest son of Ayurbarwada Buyantu Khan (Emperor Renzong) and Radnashiri of the Khunggirad clan. In return for his own crown princeship, Ayurbarwada promised his elder brother Khayishan to appoint Khayishan's son as Crown Prince after his succession. But when Khayishan died, Khayishan's two sons were relegated to borderlands and pro-Khayishan officers were purged.

Shidibala's powerful grandmother Dagi installed Shidibala as Crown Prince in 1316, and then as Khan, since he was mothered by a Khunggirad khatun. He was made the nominal head of both the Secretariat and the Bureau of Military Affairs one year later. At one time, his father Ayurbarwada had even toyed with the idea of abdicating the throne in favor of Shidebala. Dagi's protégé Temuder was made as tutor to the heir apparent, Shidibala, after he failed to increase tax revenue.

Between Ayurbarwada's death in March 1320 and his own death in October 1322, Temüder attained a great power with the full support of Dagi. Immediately after her grandson's succession, Dagi reinstated Temüder as Minister of the Secretariat and took politics into her own hands more openly than during Ayurbarwada's reign.

== Reign ==
=== Early reign and recovery of power ===
Restored paintings by modern artists. Contemporary portraits do not exist or have been destroyed

As Gegeen Khan, Prince Shidibala succeeded his father on April 19, 1320. Empress Targi (Dagi) reappointed Temuder senior grand councillor. While Temuder's persecution of his opponents in the censorate alienated the new Emperor, Temuder remained in power until his death, which came only two years later.

The return to power of Temudar was signalised by fresh excesses, and by the execution of several of those whom he suspected of having been the cause of his late trial. At length the young prince began to feel the leading strings of the Empress Dowager and Temudar rather irksome, and determined to speed on his inauguration.

From the beginning of his reign, Shidebala showed a political independence and resolution beyond his years. In a masterly move to counter the influence of the Grand Empress Dowager and Temüder, Gegeen appointed the 21-year-old Baiju, a Jalayir and grandson of Antong, who had illustrious family background and good Confucian education, as the grand councillor of the left in the summer of 1320, which gave Shidabala several political advantages. Temuder was on the high-road to the attainment of supreme power. However, Baiju, the commander of the kheshig, who was descended from Muqali, the renowned general of Genghis Khan, was a man of high character, gained great influence over the Emperor, and displaced that of Temuder.

Gegeen Khan, the young emperor, however, did not sit with folded hands. The throne soon became the focus of loyalty for the Confucian scholar-officials in their struggle against the powerful Temüder. Gegeen was prepared for such a role, for he had been as well educated in Chinese as his father had been. Deeply affected by Confucianism as well as by Buddhism, Gegeen could cite Tang poems from memory and also was a creditable calligrapher.

Besides Confucianism, Gegeen was also devoted to Buddhism. In 1321 Shidibala built a Buddhist temple in honor of 'Phags-pa Lama on the mountains west of Dadu, and when the censors reproached him he had several of them put to death; among them a very distinguished officer, named Soyaoelhatimichi, whose ancestors had been faithful dependents of the Mongol Imperial house. On the other hand, Islam suffered particularly severe discrimination during his reign. It is said that the Emperor destroyed a temple built by the Muslims, at Shangdu, and prohibited them from buying slaves from the Mongols and selling them again to the Chinese.

The growing influence of Baiju greatly disgusted Temuder. Baiju went to Liau Tung to put up a monument to his ancestors. Temudar thought this a favourable opportunity of regaining his influence at the Yuan court, and presented himself at the palace, but was refused admittance, and died shortly after that. The Empress, Dagi (Targi), died about the same time in 1322–23.

He continued his father's policy, ordering the abolition of government offices made during Kublai's reign. He also enforced a stricter discipline in government administration.

=== Policies ===
In 1322, the deaths of Dagi and Temüder enabled him to seize full power. He was able to dismantle the Khunggirad faction from the Gegeen-led new administration. The severe suppression of the powerful faction including the deprivation of Temüder's titles and estates, the execution of his son drove it into the corner. On the other hand, he appointed Baiju as the grand councillor of the right. As the sole grand councillor throughout the rest of Gegeen's reign, Baiju became a powerful ally of Gegeen. They eliminated many offices subordinate to the personal establishments of the Empress Dowager. The increasing influence of Neo-Confucianism saw greater limits placed on Mongol women who were allowed to move about more freely in public.

Soon after becoming his own master and with the help of Baiju, Gegeen Khan began to reform the government based on the Confucian principles, continued his father Ayurbarwada's policies for active promoting Chinese cultures. He and Baiju recruited for the government a great number of Chinese scholar-officials, many of whom had resigned when Temüder was in power. Heading of this list, Zhang Gui, a veteran administrator, was reappointed manager of governmental affairs and became Baiju's chief partner in carrying out reforms. Apart from the three elderly scholars appointed as councilors to the Secretariat, seven famous scholars were appointed to the Hanlin Academy. It was approximately at this same time that the Da Yuan Tong Zhi (大元通制, "the comprehensive institutions of the Great Yuan"), a huge collection of codes and regulations of the Yuan dynasty began by his father, was revised in order to rationalize the administration and facilitate the dispensation of justice.

Furthermore, to relieve the labour burdens of small landowners, Gegeen's administration stipulated that landowners set aside a certain proportion of the lands registered under their ownership from which revenues could be collected to cover corvée expenses.

== Assassination ==
Regardless of the merits of Shidibala's reign, it came to a tragic end on September 4, 1323, known as the "Coup d'état at Nanpo". A plot was formed among Temuder's supporters, who were afraid of vengeance overtaking them. It was headed by Temüder's adopted son Tegshi. Besides the high-ranking officials, five princes were involved: Altan Bukha, the younger brother of the former prince of An-si, Ananda, who was executed by Ayurbarwada's faction; and Bolad, a grandson of Ariq Böke; Yerutömör, a son of Ananda; Kulud Bukha; and Ulus Bukha, a descendant of Möngke Khan.

When Gegeen stayed at Nanpo on his way from the summer palace Shangdu to the capital Dadu of the Yuan dynasty, Gegeen and Baiju were assassinated by Tegshi, who attacked Gegeen's Ordo with Asud guards and other soldiers under him. Tegshi asked Yesün Temür to succeed the throne, but Yesün Temür purged Tegshi's faction before he entered Dadu because he feared to become a puppet of it.

Gegeen's reign was short; his direct rule lasted only for a year after Dagi's death. But he was glorified in Chinese records since he and his father, aided by their sinicized Mongolian ministers and Chinese scholar-officials, had made vigorous efforts to transform further the Yuan along traditional Confucian lines. From that point of view, Gegeen's assassination was sometimes explained as the struggle between the pro-Confucian faction and the opposite steppe elite faction, for Yesün Temür Khan had ruled Mongolia before succession and his policies appeared relatively unfavorable for Chinese officials.

His marriage to Sugabala, produced no children to succeed him.

== See also ==
- List of emperors of the Yuan dynasty
- List of Mongol rulers
- List of rulers of China

Gegeen Khan House of Borjigin Born: 1302 Died: 1323
Regnal titles
Preceded by Ayurbarwada Buyantu Khan, Emperor Renzong	Great Khan of the Mongol Empire (Nominal due to the empire's division); 1320–1323	Succeeded by Yesün Temür Khan, Emperor Taiding
Preceded by Ayurbarwada Buyantu Khan, Emperor Renzong	Emperor of the Yuan dynasty Emperor of China; 1320–1323	Succeeded by Yesün Temür Khan, Emperor Taiding
