= Chabi =

Empress Chabi
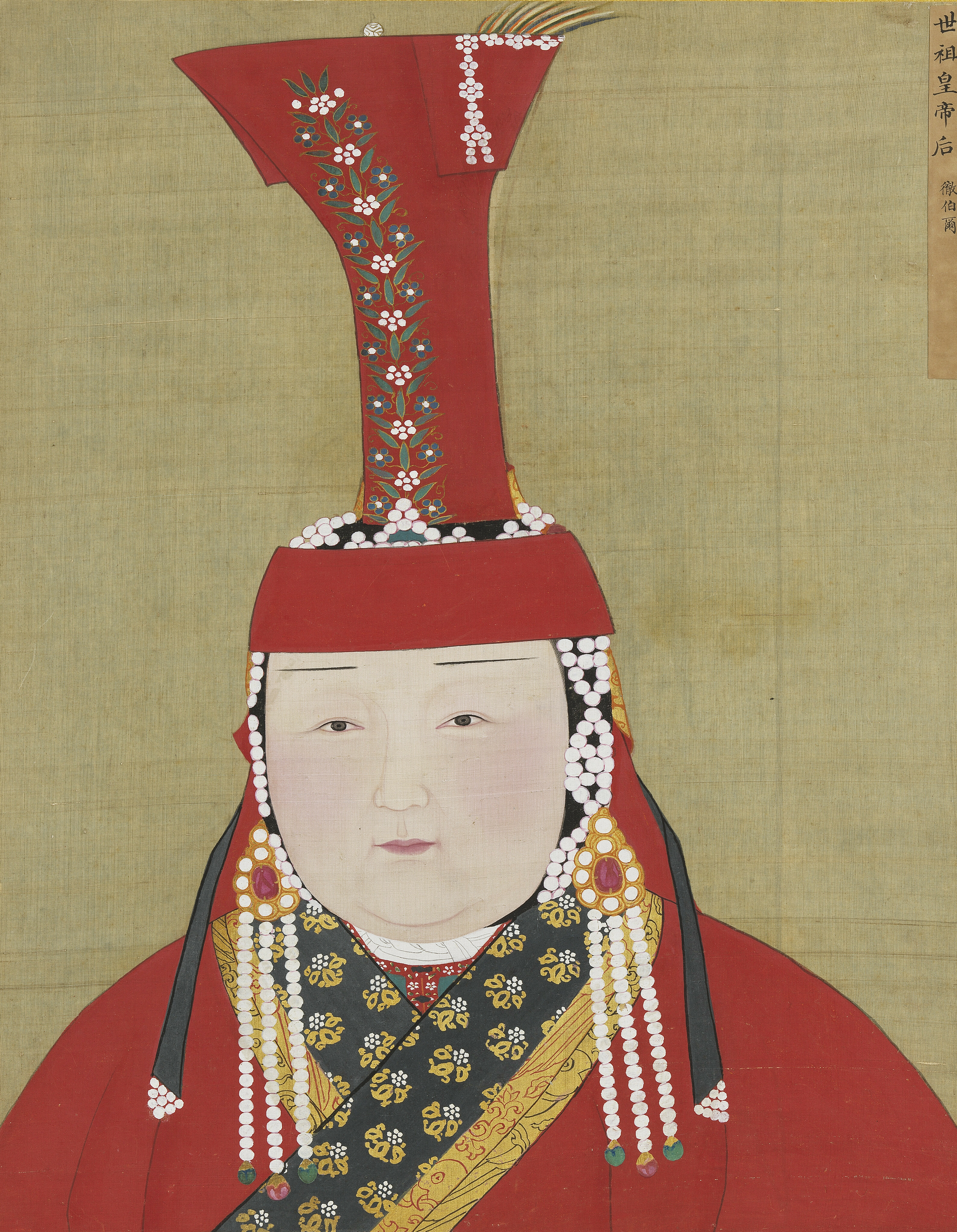
- Portrait by Araniko, displaying the characteristic gugu hat

Khatun of Mongols
- Tenure: 1260–1281
- Predecessor: Khutughtai khatun
- Successor: Empress Nambui

Empress consort of the Yuan dynasty
- Tenure: 1271–1281
- Predecessor: Empress Quan
- Successor: Empress Nambui
- Born: 28 January 1216
- Died: 20 March 1281 (aged 65)
- Spouse: Kublai Khan (1239-1281)
- Issue: Zhenjin; Manggala; Nomugan
Posthumous name
- Empress Zhaorui Shunsheng (昭睿順聖皇后)
- Clan: Khongirad
- Father: Anchen, Prince of Jining zhongwu of Khongirad (濟寧忠武王 按陳)
- Religion: Buddhism

Chabi (Mongolian: Чаби хатан, ᠴᠠᠪᠢ ᠬᠠᠲᠤᠨ; Chinese: 察必, c. 1216–1281) was a Khongirad empress consort of the Yuan dynasty, married to Kublai Khan.

== Life ==
Chabi was born around 1216 to Anchen (按陳), Prince of Jining Zhongwu (濟寧忠武王) of Khongirad. She married Kublai as his second wife and bore him four sons and six daughters. She was an important political and diplomatic influence, especially in pleasing the Chinese masses through reconciliation with Confucianism. She was compared to Börte though for her reputation. Rashid al-Din described her as extremely beautiful and charming.

Möngke Khagan died in 1259 while Kublai was campaigning against the Song dynasty. She warned her husband of advancements of Ariq Böke beforehand. After the conquest of China, she suggested a better treatment of the north Chinese imperial family, namely Empress Quan in 1276. She also introduced new court fashion in the form of hats. Chabi also fiercely promoted Buddhism in the high levels of government. She also named her child under the influence of Buddhism. She mediated religious disputes between Kublai and Phagpa, and supported the latter both economically and politically. She was also patron of Zangpo Pal.

Here are some of the many accomplishments of the queen: "Mongol hats didn't have a brim before. The king's eyes sparkled when he shot a bow and arrow. When he told the queen about it, the queen immediately sewed a brim for his hat. The king was very happy and immediately started to wear the hat. This sable hat is the hat depicted in the portraits of many Mongolian kings of the Yuan dynasty.

The queen made another item of clothing. According to the Yuan shi, the invention of bijia is attributed to Empress Chabi during the Yuan dynasty. Empress Chabi designed the bijia so that it would be a convenient form of attire while riding horses and shooting arrows. The front region of the bijia designed by Empress Chabi was made of a single piece of fabric, and its back region was twice as long as the front region. It was collarless and sleeveless, and there were two loop straps which attached to it. It also had no lapels. The bijia was first worn by the Yuan dynasty emperor but it later became popular among commoners.

She died in 1281, probably arranging for her niece Nambui to marry Kublai afterwards. She was posthumously renamed Empress Zhaorui Shunsheng (昭睿順聖皇后) by her grandson Temür Khan.

== Family ==
Chabi had four sons and six daughters with Kublai Khan:

1. Grand Princess of Zhao, Yuelie (赵国大長公主) — married to Ay Buqa, Prince of Zhao (趙王)
2. Grand Princess of Chang, Ulujin (吾魯真公主) — married to Buqa from Ikires clan
3. Princess-Aunt of the State of Chang, Chalun (昌国大长公主) – married to Teliqian from Ikires clan
4. Crown Prince Zhenjin (1240–1285) — Prince of Yan (燕王)
5. Manggala (c. 1242–1280) — Prince of Anxi (安西王)
6. Grand Princess of Lu, Öljei (鲁国长公主) — married to Ulujin Küregen from Khongirad clan, Prince of Lu
7. Nomugan (d. 1301) — Prince of Beiping (北平王)
8. Grand Princess of Lu, Nangiajin (鲁国大长公主) — married to Ulujin Küregen from Khongirad clan, Princess of Lu, then after Ulujin's death in 1278 to his brother Temür, and after Temür's death in 1290 to a third brother, Manzitai
9. Kokechi (d.1271) — Prince of Yunnan (云南王)
10. Imperial-Aunt of the State of Je, Qutluq kelmish (忽都魯 揭里迷失) (c.1251-1297) — married Chungnyeol of Goryeo

== In popular media ==
Chabi was portrayed several times in TV series and films:

- Marco Polo (1982) by Beulah Quo
- Eternal Happiness (2002) by Law Lan
- The Legend of Kublai Khan (2013) by Charmaine Sheh
- Marco Polo (2014) by Joan Chen
- Hojo Tokimune (2001) by Shurenhuar

== Sources ==
- Stearns, Peter N.; Michael Adas; Stuart B. Schwartz; Marc Jason Gilbert (2011). "14 • The Last Great Nomadic Challenges: From Chinggis Khan to Timur". World Civilizations: The Global Experience AP* Edition (6th ed.). pp. 327–328. ISBN 978-0-13-136020-4.
- Jack Weatherford (2011). The Secret History of the Mongol Queens: How the Daughters of Genghis Khan Rescued His Empire Paperback. Broadway Books. ISBN 0307407160.

Preceded by Tegulen	Consort of Kublai Khan; 1234–1281	Succeeded by Nambui
Preceded by Khutughtai Khatun	Khatun of the Mongols; 1260–1281	Succeeded by Nambui
Preceded by Empress Quan (Song dynasty)	Empress of Yuan; 1271–1281	Succeeded by Nambui
