= Bulugan =

Empress consort of the Yuan dynasty (died 1307)

Empress consort of the Yuan dynasty and Khatun of Mongols
- Reign: 1299–1307
- Predecessor: Shirindari
- Successor: Zhenge
- Born: 1258
- Died: 1307 (aged 48–49)
- Spouse: Temür Khan
- Clan: Bayads
- Father: Torgus Küregen
- Mother: Ayalguu

Bulugan or Bulukhan (Mongolian: Булган хатан,ᠪᠤᠷᠬᠠᠨ; Chinese: 卜魯罕) was a Mongol princess, the consort of Yuan emperor Temür Khan (r. 1294–1307). Bulugan acted as regent for her ill husband and virtually ruled the empire.

== Biography ==
She belonged to the Baya'ut tribe, the daughter of Torgus Küregen who had served Genghis Khan.

She was made empress following Shirindari's death in 1305.

Bulugan acted as regent for her ill husband and virtually ruled the empire. She made Shirindari's son Prince Deshou the heir apparent in June 1305. To ensure the boy's succession, she removed all the potential rivals from the court. For example, Darmabala's son Ayurbarwada was sent to Henan as the prince of Huaining, but Deshou died on 3 January 1306.

=== Later life ===
Later in 1307 when Temür Khan died, Bulugan kept away the Khunggirad-mothered brothers Khaishan and Ayurbarwada and attempted to set up Muslim Ananda, son of Manggala as new khagan. Bulugan herself married Ananda and converted to Islam. Her alliance was supported by some senior officials of the Secretariat under Aqutai. Ananda was a popular prince who successfully protected the provinces of the Yuan against the Ögedeid and Chaghatayid armies and had a bulk of the imperial army under him in Anxi. But he lacked of military power in the imperial capital city and was a Muslim opposed to the majority of the Buddhist and Tengriist Mongols. The Khongirad faction alarmed by it and arrested Ananda and Bulugan by coup and recalled Ayurbarwada and Dagi from Henan. Then Khayishan decided to hold the coronation ceremony in Shangdu just as his great-grandfather Khubilai Khan did, and advanced southward with the most part of his army. He was welcomed by Ayurbarwada, who gave up khanship, and ascended to the throne. They executed Ananda, Bulugan and their retainers in 1307.

Preceded by Shirindari	Yuan empress consort 1295–1307	Succeeded by Zhenge
