= Shirindari =

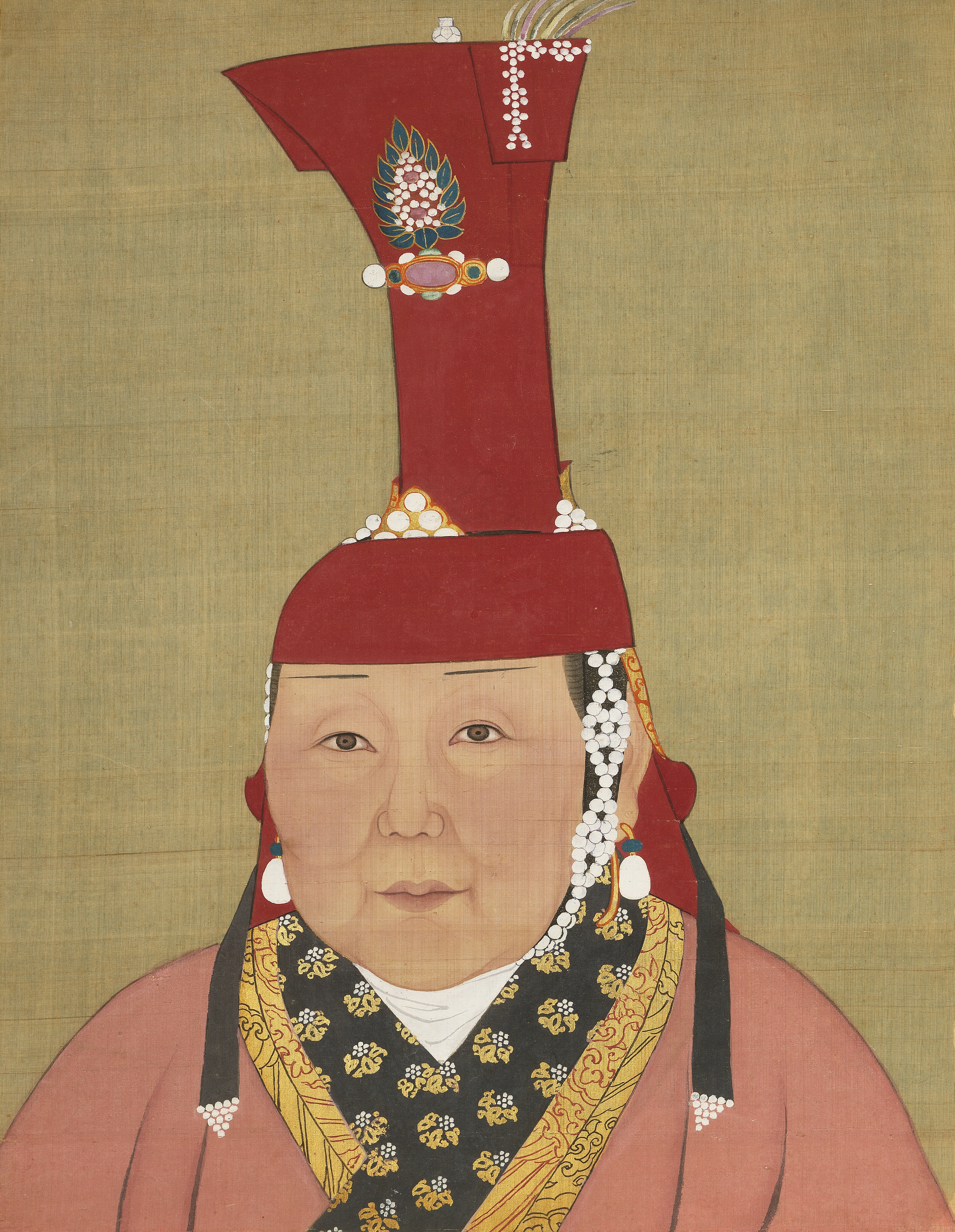
- Portrait of Shirindari according to George Zhao

Khatun of Mongols
- Tenure: 1294–1305
- Predecessor: Nambui
- Successor: Bulugan
- Born: 22 May 1265
- Died: 25 October 1305 (aged 40)
- Spouse: Temür Khan
Posthumous name
- Empress Zhenci Jingyi (貞慈靜懿皇后)
- Clan: Khongirad

Shirindari (Mongolian: Шириндарь; Chinese: 失怜答里; pinyin: Shīliándálǐ) was a consort of the Yuan dynasty from 1294 to 1305, as the principal consort of Temür Khan (Emperor Chengzong). She was posthumously elevated to the status of an empress.

== Biography ==
Like Chabi and Nambui, she was from Khongirad clan. Her father was Olochin, who was Kublai Khan's sister Yesubuha's son and her mother was Grand Princess Öljei of Lu, daughter of Kublai and Chabi. Her mother Öljei died when she was 5 and her father Olochin died in 1277. She was raised to be queen by her grandmother Chabi. According to History of Yuan, she was married to Temür Khan and bore his only son Prince Dashi (died January 3, 1306). However, Japanese researcher Uno Nobuhiro thinks of this information as later falsification by Ayurbawada's mother Dagi, according to him it was Bulugan who bore Temür a son. She died in 1305 and was replaced by Bulugan as principal wife of Temür. She was given a posthumous title Empress Zhēncí Jìngyì (Chinese: 贞慈静懿皇后; lit. 'Chaste', 'kind', 'quiet and good empress') by Külüg Khan.
