= Yerutömör =

Yerutömör (Chinese: 月魯帖木兒, Mongolian: Ерүтөмөр) was a prince of the Yuan dynasty of China. He was the third and last king of Anxi. His father was Ananda. By blood, he was the great-grandson of Kublai Khan.

Yerutömör participated in the assassination of the Yuan emperor Gegeen Khan along with the main plotter Tegshi (step-son of Temuder). The incident and death of Gegeen Khan was known as the Nanpo Incident. After Yesün Temür took power, Yerutömör was officially announced the king of Anxi.

After the death of Yesün Temür, the anti-Gegeen Khan bloc in the court weakened. Jayaatu Khan, upon his accession to the throne, eliminated people who participated in the assassination of Gegeen. Since Yerutömör was one of the key figure during the Nanpo Incident, he was deprived of his title and exiled to the province of Yunnan under the charge of treason.

In the year 1332, Yerutömör was executed because he was plotting a new conspiracy against Jayaatu Khan. Several Buddhist monks who participated in his plot were also executed. His death marked the end of the lineage of Manggala, the third son of Kublai.
