= Empress Zhaosheng =

Empress Zhaosheng (Chinese: 昭聖皇后) or Empress Dowager Zhaosheng (Chinese: 昭聖太后) may refer to:

- Empress Zhou (Former Shu) (died 918), Wang Jian's wife
- Empress Li (Later Han) (died 954), Liu Chengyou's mother
- Empress Zhaosheng (Jin dynasty) (1139–1163), mother of Emperor Xuanzong of Jin
- Empress Dowager Ma (Southern Ming) (1578–1669), Zhu Youlang's mother
- Empress Dowager Xiaozhuang (1613–1688), mother of the Shunzhi Emperor

== See also ==
- Empress Wenxian Zhaosheng (died before 1329), the mother of Jayaatu Khan (Emperor Wenzong of Yuan)
- Empress Chiêu Thánh (昭聖皇后; died 1108), one of the consorts of Lý Nhân Tông
