= Ananda (King of Anxi) =

Ananda (Chinese: 阿難答, Mongolian: ᠠᠨᠠᠨᠳᠠ) was an imperial prince of the Yuan dynasty of China. He was descended from Genghis Khan, as the grandson of Kublai Khan, and son of Manggala, the third son of Kublai. He held the noble title of King of Anxi (安西王).

Ananda was a devoted Muslim. According to Persian historian Rashid-al-Din Hamadani, he was raised by a Muslim from Central Asia whose name was Hassan. Under the influence of his step-father, Ananda became a Muslim. Temür Khan of China, the cousin of Ananda, tried to convert Ananda to Buddhism after discovering that Ananda was promulgating Islam in northwestern China where his fief was located. The prince's action was seen as unorthodox since most of the Mongols were affiliated with Buddhism. However, Ghazan Khan of Persia, another member of Genghis Khan's family, converted to Islam as well. Ananda mentioned Ghazan upon being called to the court. Temür was not able to change the mind of Ananda and decided to tolerate his practice of religion.

The father of Ananda was enfeoffed with the Hexi Region, Tibet, and Sichuan Province. The broad fief made Ananda a competitive player in the politics of China. He gathered his army under his tent and converted his soldiers to Islam. The location of Ananda's throne was in the Liupan mountains of northwestern China where Genghis Khan spent his final days. The official title of Ananda was King of Anxi.

In 1295, Ananda was in charge of the defense against Kaidu's invasion of Yuan China. After the death of Temür Khan, Ananda aimed his goal at seizing the throne of China. He was appointed the regent of China with the support of Aqutai, the left chancellor. However, his ambition was disillusioned by Külüg Khan and right chancellor Qarahesun in the year 1307. In the same year, he was executed by Külüg.

Ananda's scheme of usurpation, at first glance, was prevented by Külüg. However, according to the History of Yuan, Ayurbarwada, younger brother of Külüg, came to Khanbaliq before Ananda took power and imprisoned him.

After his defeat and death, the Muslim population under his rule remained and became one of the main sources of Hui people. His enthusiasm in Islam also made it one of the most important religions in northwestern China.

Ananda had a son, Yerutömör who inherited his title and became King of Anxi.

== See also ==
- Hui people
- Ghazan Khan
- Hazara people
