= Pagoda of Bailin Temple =

Tower in Hebei, China

Coordinates: 37°44′51″N 114°46′41″E

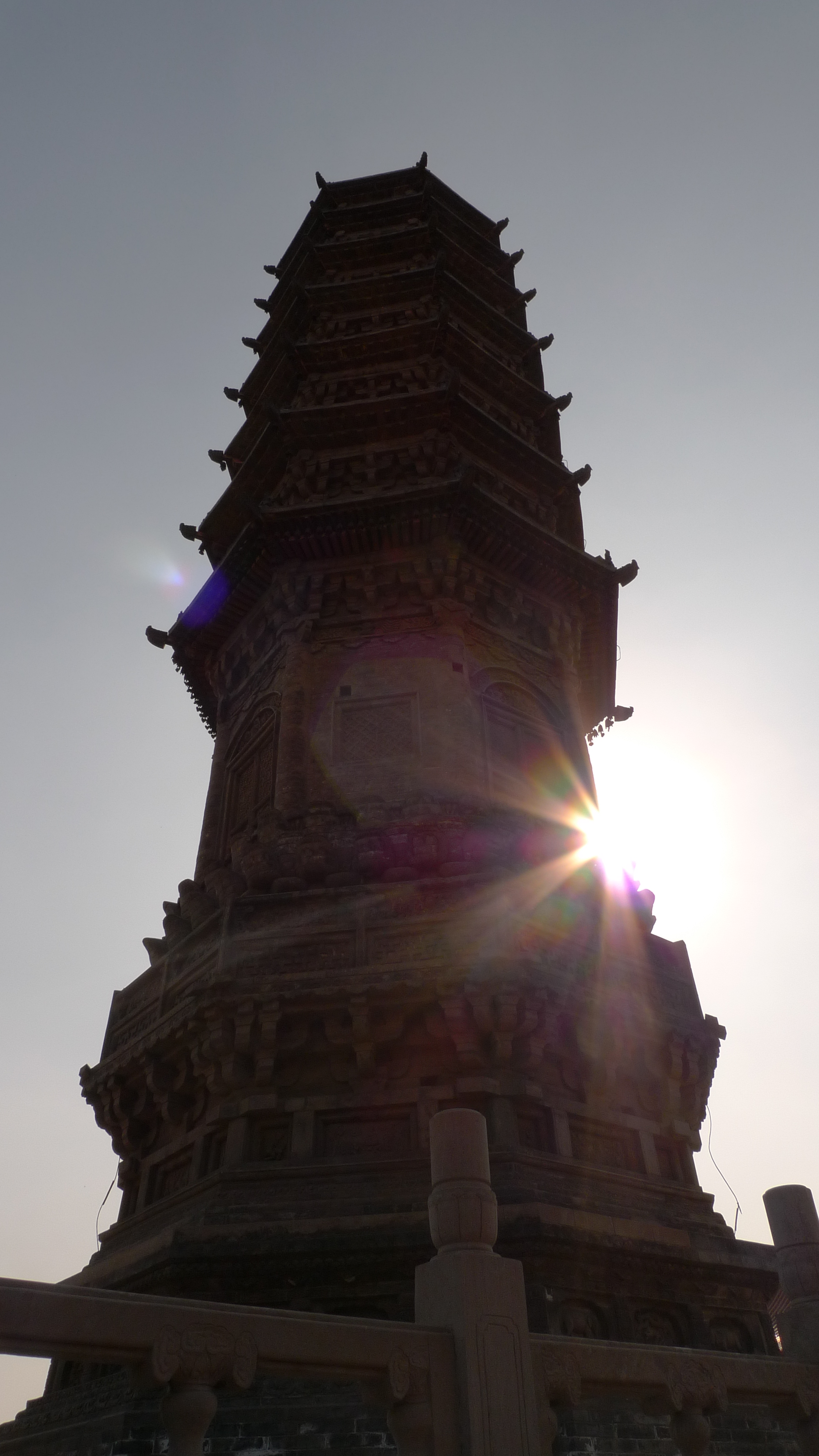
- The Pagoda of Bailin Temple
- Traditional Chinese: 從諗禪師舍利塔
- Simplified Chinese: 从谂禅师舍利塔
Transcriptions
Standard Mandarin
- Hanyu Pinyin: Cóngshěn Chánshī Shělìtǎ

Zhaozhou Pagoda
- Traditional Chinese: 趙州塔
- Simplified Chinese: 赵州塔
Transcriptions
Standard Mandarin
- Hanyu Pinyin: Zhàozhōu Tǎ

The Pagoda of Bailin Temple (Chinese: 从谂禅师舍利塔 or 赵州塔), is located in Zhao County, Hebei. It is an octagonal-based brick Chinese pagoda built in 1330 during the reign of Emperor Wenzong, ruler of the Mongol-led Yuan dynasty.

== Bailin Monastery ==
The Bailin Monastery (Cypress Trees monastery,) surrounding the pagoda, was built in the second century CE, and called Guan Yin Monastery. Its most prominent abbot was the famous Chan master Zhaozhou (Joshu), who is well known for the Mu-koan.

The temple was in ruin long before 1949. In 1988, Jing Hui was persuaded to take over the Hebei Buddhist Association, and start rebuilding Bailin Monastery. Jing Hui is a student and dharma successor of Hsu Yun, but has also adopted the Humanistic Buddhism of Taixu. (Note: See for more information on Jinghui.) (Note: At least three westerners are, or claim, to be dharma successors to Jing Hui: Lily-Marie Johnson (Ming Qi) and Johnny Petersen/MingBao. and Daniel Odier.)

== Pagoda ==
The seven-story pagoda stands at a height of about 40 m (131 ft), built on a stone foundation. The lower section of the pagoda is a brick sumeru pedestal, which features two rows of intricate carvings that include artwork of musicians, celestial guardians, animals, and peonies. The first story of this solid brick pagoda features a facade of doors and windows, as well as columns, rafters, and brackets. Above this are seven tiers of eaves.

The design style of this Yuan dynasty era pagoda follows the tradition of the Liao dynasty and Jin dynasty, which were Khitan and Jurchen dynasties that ruled northern China before Kublai Khan established the Yuan.

== Lineage ==
1. 达摩 Bodhidharma/Dá-Mó (? – ca 530)
2. 大祖慧可 Dà-Zǔ Huì-Kě (? - ?)
3. 鑑智僧璨 Jiàn-Zhì Sēn- Càn (? – 606)
4. 道信 Dà-yī Dào-Xìn (? – 651)
5. 弘忍Da-Man Hóng-Rěn (601 – 674)
6. 大鑒惠能 Dà-Jiàn Huì-Néng (638–713)
7. 南嶽懐譲 Nán-Yuè Huái-Ràng (677–744)
8. 馬祖道 Mǎ-Zŭ Dào-Yī (709–788)
9. 百丈懷海 Bǎi-Zhàng Huái-Hái (720–814)
10. 黄檗希运 Huáng-Bò Xī-Yùn (? - 850)
11. 临济义玄 Lín-Jì Yì-Xuán (? - 866)
12. 興化存獎 Xīng-Huá Cún-Jiǎng (830 - 888)
13. 南院慧顒 Nán-Yuàn Huì-Yóng (? - 952)
14. 瘋穴延沼 Fēng-Xué Yán-Zhǎo (896 - 973)
15. 首山省念 Shǒu-Shān Shěng-Niàn (926 - 993)
16. 汾陽善昭 Fén-Yáng Shàn-Zhāo (947 - 1024)
17. 石霜楚園 Shí-Shuāng Chǔ-Yuán (986 - 1039)
18. 楊岐方會 Yáng-Qí Fāng-Hùi (992 - 1049)
19. 白雲守端 Bái-Yún Shǒu Duān (1025 - 1072)
20. 五祖法演 Wǔ-Zǔ Fǎ-Yǎn (1024 - 1104)
21. 圜俉克勤 Huán-Wú Kè-Qín (1063 - 1135)
22. 虎丘紹隆 Hǔ-Qiū Sháo-Lóng (1077 - 1136)
23. 應俺曇華 Yīng-ǎn Tán-Húa (1103 - 1163)
24. 密俺咸榤 Mì-ǎn Xián-Jié (1118 - 1186)
25. 破俺祖先 Pò-ǎn Zǔ-Xiān (1136 - 1211)
26. 無準師範 Wú-Zhǔn Shī-Fàn (1174 - 1249)
27. 淨慈妙侖 Jìng-Cí Miào-Lún (1201 - 1261)
28. 瑞巖文寶 Ruì-Yán Wén-Bǎo (? - 1335)
29. 華頂先覩 Húa-Dǐng Xiān-Dǔ (1265 - 1334)
30. 福林智度 Fú-Lín Zhì-Dù (1304 - 1370)
31. 古拙昌俊 Gǔ-Zhuō Chāng-Jùn (? - ?)
32. 無際明俉 Wú-Jì Míng-Wú (? - ?)
33. 太岡橙 Tài-Gāng-Chéng (? - ?)
34. 矣峰寧 Yǐ-Fēng-Níng (? - 1491)
35. 天目寶芳進 Tiān-Mù Bǎo-Fāng-Jìn (? - ?)
36. 野滃慧嘵 Yě-Wěng Huì-Xiāo (? - ?)
37. 無趣如空 Wú-Qù Rú-Kōng (1491 - 1580)
38. 無幻性沖 Wú-Huàn Xìng-Chōng (1540 - 1611)
39. 興善慧廣 Xīng-Shàn Huì-Guǎng (1576 - 1620)
40. 普明徳用 Pǔ-Míng Dé-Yóng (1587 - 1642)
41. 高菴圓淸 Gāo-ān Yuán-Qīng (? - ?)
42. 本智明戄 Běn-Zhì Ming-Jué (? - ?)
43. 紫柏真可 Zǐ-Bó Zhēn-Kě (1543 - 1603)
44. 端旭茹弘 Duān-Xù Rú-Hóng (? - ?)
45. 純榤性奎 Chún-Jié Xìng-Kuí (? - ?)
46. 慈雲海俊 Cí-Yún Hǎi-Jùn (? - ?)
47. 質生寂文 Zhì-Shēng Jì-Wén (? - ?)
48. 端員照華 Duān-Yuán Zhào-Huá (? - ?)
49. 其岸普明 Qí-Án Pǔ-Míng (? - ?)
50. 弢巧通聖 Tāo-Qiǎo Tōng-Shèng (? - ?)
51. 俉修心空 Wú-Xiū Xīn-Kòng (? - ?)
52. 宏化原俉 Hóng-Hùa Yuán-Wú (? - ?)
53. 祥青廣廣 Xiáng-Qīng Guǎng (? - ?)
54. 守道續先 Shǒu-Dào Xù-Xiān (? - ?)
55. 正岳本超 Zhēng-Yué Běn-Chāo (? - ?)
56. 永暢矍 Yǒng-Chàng Jué (? - ?)
57. 方來昌遠 Fāng-Lái Chāng-Yuǎn (? - ?)
58. 豁俉隆參 Huò-Wú Lóng-Cān (? - ?)
59. 維超能燦 Wéi-Chāo Néng-Càn (? - ?)
60. 奇量仁繁 Qí-Liàng Rén-Fán (? - ?)
61. 妙連聖華 Miào-Lián Shèng-Huá (? - ?)
62. 鼎峰果成 Dǐng-Fēng Guǒ-Féng (? - ?)
63. 善慈常開 Shàn-Cí Cháng-Kāi (? - ?)
64. 徳情演徹 Dé-Qíng Yǎn-Chè/虛雲 Xū-Yún (1840 - 1959)
65. 净慧老和 Jìng-Huì Lǎo-Hé (1940 - 2013)

== Notes ==
=== Sources ===
- Zhu, Caifang (2003), Buddhism in China Today: The Example of the Bai Lin Chan Monastery. In: Perspectives, Volume 4, No.2, June 2003 (PDF), archived from the original on 2010-09-29
- Feuchtwang, Stephen (2010), The Anthropology of Religion, Charisma and Ghosts: Chinese Lessons for Adequate Theory, Walter de Gruyter
