= Zhenge =

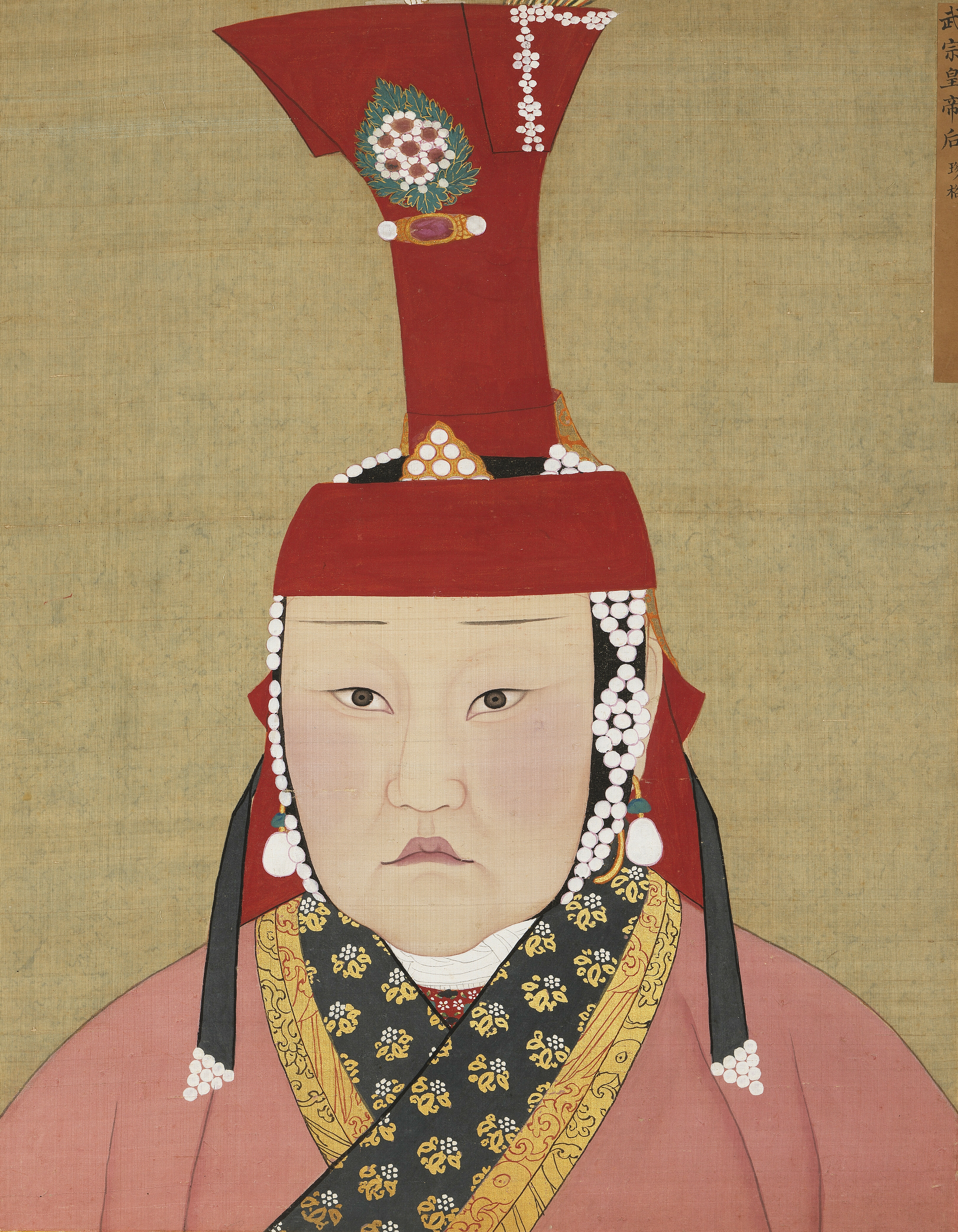

Empress consort of the Yuan dynasty and Khatun of Mongols
- Tenure: 1310–1311
- Predecessor: Empress Bulugan
- Successor: Empress Radnashiri
- Born: 4 April 1284
- Died: 22 November 1327 (aged 43)
- Spouse: Külüg Khan
Posthumous name
- Empress Xuanci Huisheng (宣慈惠聖皇后)
- House: Khongirad
- Father: Bengabala
- Mother: Hudademishi

Zhenge (Mongolian: Жэнгэ хатан; Chinese: 真哥; died 1327) was an empress consort of the Yuan dynasty, married to Külüg Khan (Emperor Wuzong). Is Zhenge Parents Name is Bengabala & Hudademishi Bengabala Is Daughter. Hudademishi Zhenjin’s Daughter

She was daughter of Bengbula and granddaughter of Tuolian, both notable commanders from Khongirad tribe. Her aunt Tegülün Khatun was married to Kublai. She had a brother called Maizhuhan.

She was created empress by Külüg in 1310. She had no children and left the palace in 1313 to become a bhikkuni.

She died in November 1327 and was interred together with her late husband. She was accorded the posthumous name Empress Xuanci Huisheng (Chinese: 宣慈惠圣皇后; lit. 'Kind', 'virtuous and holy empress') by Yesün Temür.

== Sources ==
- Zhao, George Qingzhi (2008), Marriage as Political Strategy and Cultural Expression: Mongolian Royal Marriages from World Empire to Yuan Dynasty, Peter Lang, ISBN 978-1433102752

Chinese royalty
Preceded by Bulugan	Empress of the Yuan dynasty 1310–1311	Succeeded by Radnashiri
