= Külüg Khan =

Emperor of Yuan China from 1307 to 1311

Emperor Wuzong of Yuan; Külüg Khan
- 7th Khagan of the Mongol Empire (Nominal due to the empire's division); Emperor of China (3rd Emperor of the Yuan dynasty)
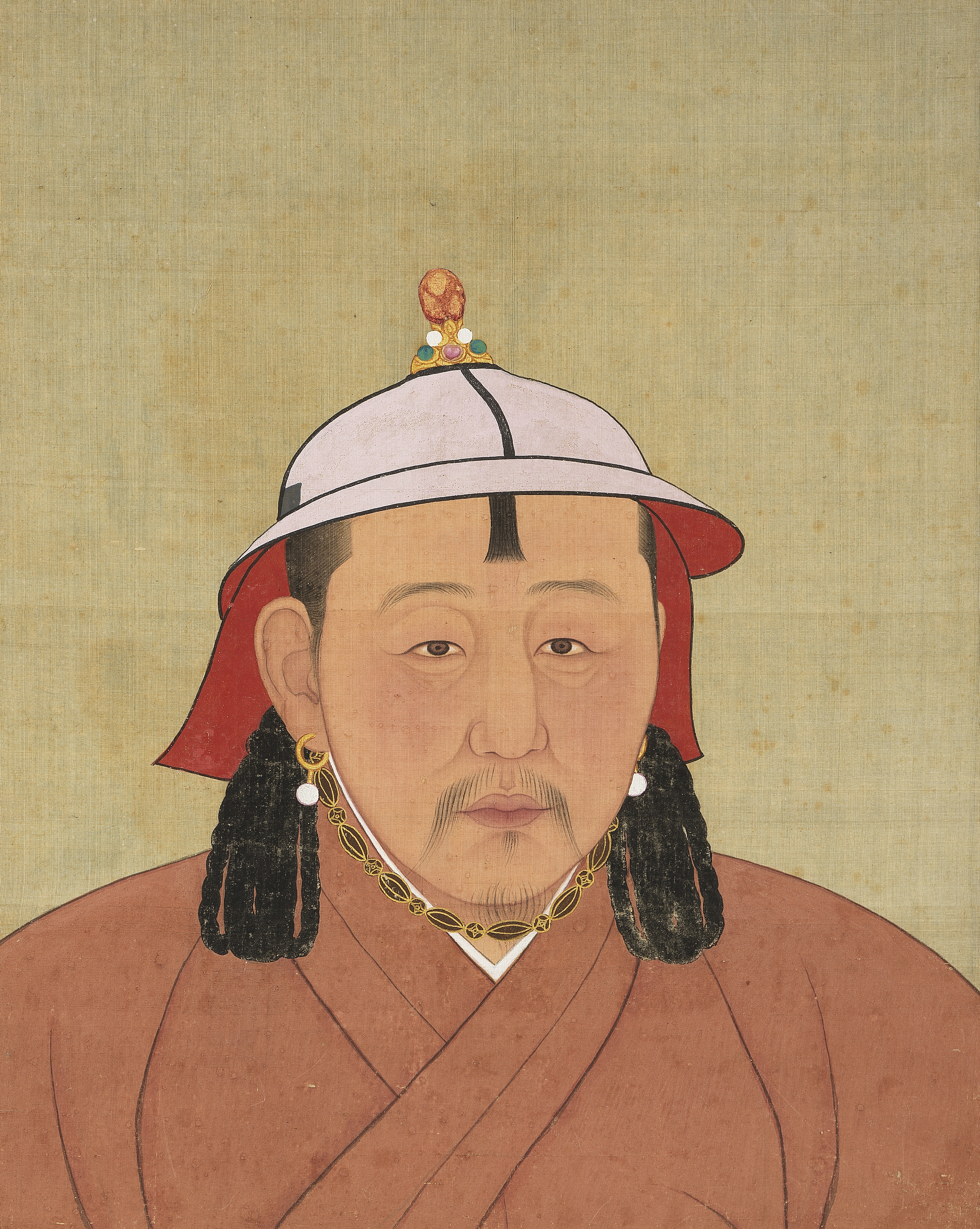
- Portrait of Külüg Khan (Emperor Wuzong), from the Yuan era.

Emperor of the Yuan dynasty
- Reign: 21 June 1307 – 27 January 1311
- Coronation: 21 June 1307
- Predecessor: Temür Khan
- Successor: Ayurbarwada Buyantu Khan
- Born: 4 August 1281; Dadu, Yuan dynasty
- Died: 27 January 1311 (aged 29); Dadu, Yuan dynasty
- Empress: Empress Zhenge of Khongirad clan (m. 1310); Empress Sugeshili of Khongirad clan (m. 1310)
- Issue: Khutughtu Khan Kusala; Jayaatu Khan Tugh Temür
Names
- Mongolian:ᠬᠠᠶᠢᠰᠠᠩ; Chinese: 海山; Qayisan/Khayishan
Era dates
- Zhida (至大) 1308–1311
Regnal name
- Emperor Tongtian Jisheng Qinwen Yingwu Dazhang Xiao (統天繼聖欽文英武大章孝皇帝); Külüg Khan (ᠬᠦᠯᠦᠭ ᠬᠠᠭᠠᠨ; 曲律汗)
Posthumous name
- Emperor Renhui Xuanxiao (仁惠宣孝皇帝)
Temple name
- Wuzong (武宗)
- House: Borjigin
- Dynasty: Yuan
- Father: Darmabala
- Mother: Dagi Khatun
- Religion: Buddhism

Külüg Khan (Mongolian: Хүлэг Хаан; Mongolian script: ᠬᠥᠯᠥᠭ; Chinese: 曲律汗), born Khayishan (Mongolian: Хайсан ᠬᠠᠶᠢᠰᠠᠩ; Chinese: 海山, Mongolian: Хайсан, meaning "wall" (Note: However according to a record written by a contemporary official Zhao Mengfu, the name was actually Chinese Haishan (海山, "mountains and seas").)), also known by his temple name as the Emperor Wuzong of Yuan (Chinese: 元武宗; pinyin: Yuán Wǔzōng; Wade–Giles: Wu-Tsung) (4 August 1281 – 27 January 1311), was an emperor of the Yuan dynasty of China. Apart from being the Emperor of China, he is regarded as the seventh Great Khan of the Mongol Empire, although it was only nominal due to the division of the empire. His regnal name "Külüg Khan" means "warrior Khan" or "fine horse Khan" in the Mongolian language.

== Early life ==
He was the first son of Darmabala and Dagi of the influential Khunggirad clan, and the full brother of Ayurbarwada. He was sent to Mongolia to assume an army that defended the western front of the Yuan against Kaidu, de facto ruler of the Chagatai Khanate, and other princes in Central Asia under him. In 1289, Khayishan's force was nearly routed and the Kipchak commander, Tutugh, rescued him from capture by Kaidu's army. In 1301, he clashed with Kaidu, who died from a battle wound. In recognition of the great success, Külüg Khan was given the title of Prince Huaining (懷寧王) in 1304.

When Chapar attacked Duwa, Temür helped the latter and sent an army under Khayishan. In 1306 Khayishan forced Melig Temür, a son of Ariq Böke, who had aligned himself with Kaidu, to accept a surrender in the Altai Mountains and pushed Kaidu's successor Chapar westward. For these military achievements he gained a high reputation among Mongol princes and non-Mongol corps. Since his uncle Temür Khan did not have a male heir, he was considered a major candidate for the emperor.

== Enthronement ==
In 1307, when Temür Khan died, Külüg Khan returned eastward to Karakorum and watched the situation. Temür's widow Bulugan of the Bayaud tribe had kept away the Khunggirad-mothered brothers of Khayishan and Ayurbarwada and attempted to set up Ananda, a Muslim cousin of Temür, who was the prince of Anxi. Her alliance was supported by some senior officials of the Secretariat under Aqutai, the Chancellor of the Left. They made Bulugan regent and intended to put Ananda on the throne. Ananda was a popular prince who had successfully defended the Yuan against the Ögedeid and Chagatayid armies and had a bulk of the imperial army under him in Anxi. However, he lacked military power in the imperial capital city and was a Muslim, as opposed to the majority of the Yuan Mongols.

The Darkhan Harghasun, Tura, a great-great-grandson of Chagatai Khan, and Yakhutu, a descendant of Tolui, fought for the candidacy of Darmabala's sons against them. The pro-Darmabalaid faction arrested Ananda and Bulugan by coup and recalled Ayurbarwada and Dagi from Henan. Then, Khayishan decided to hold the coronation ceremony in Shangdu just as his great-grandfather Kublai Khan did and advanced southward with thirty thousand soldiers from Mongolia. He was welcomed by Ayurbarwada, who gave up emperorship, and ascended to the throne, having executed Ananda and Bulugan prior to his succession. Ariq Böke's son, Melig Temür, was also executed because of his support for Ananda.

Khayishan's enthronement at Shangdu on 21 June 1307, was performed properly at a kurultai. After that, he made his younger brother Ayurbarwada the heir apparent, and they promised that their descendants would succeed each other in relay.

== Reign ==
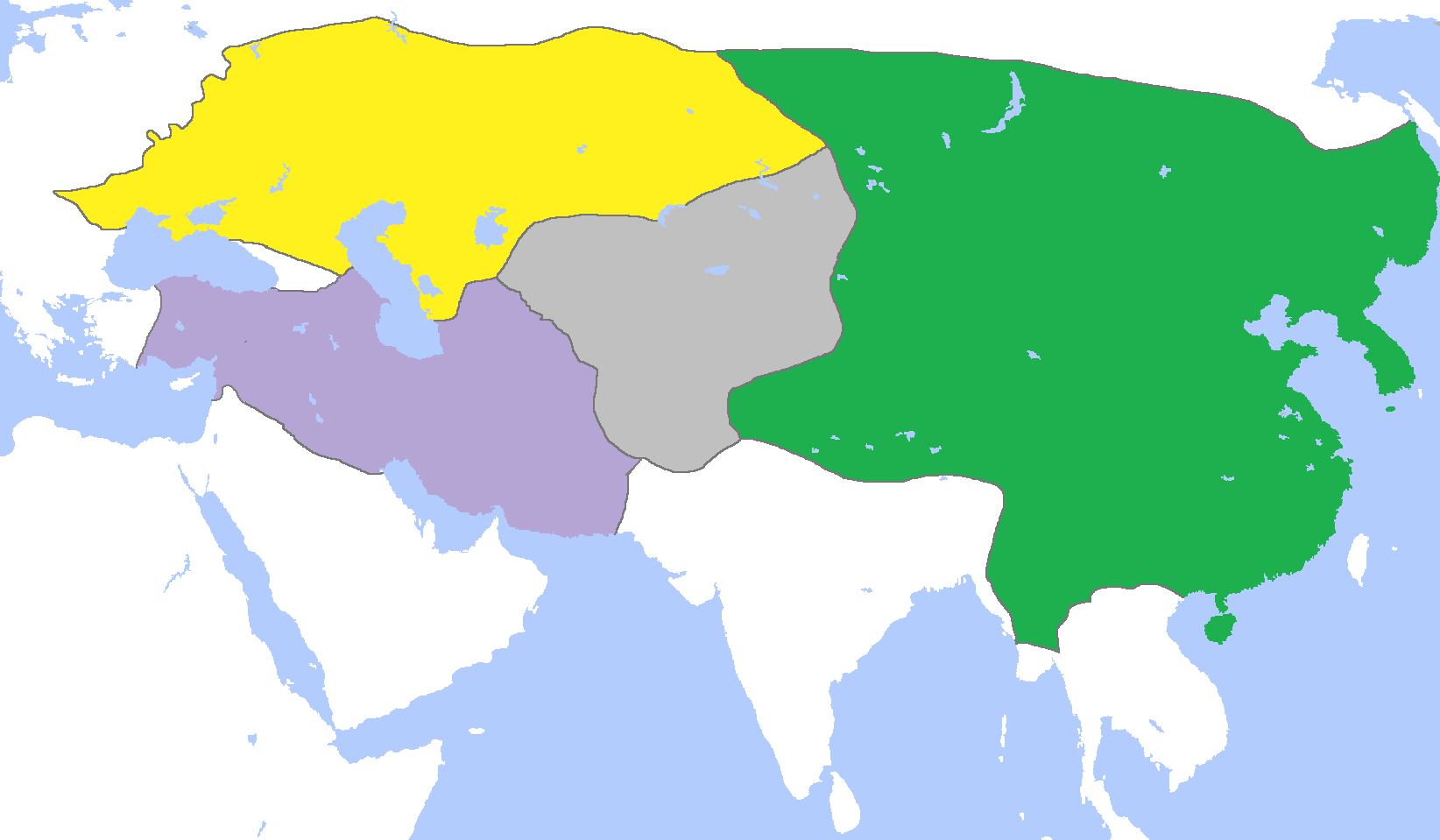
The division of the Mongol Empire (c. 1300).

Soon after Khayishan's accession the Classic of Filial Piety (Xiao Jing), one of the works attributed to Confucius, having been translated into the Mongolian language, was distributed throughout the empire. He granted the princes and officials who attended his ceremony lavish gifts in accordance with the amounts set by the previous emperor. Huge amounts, moreover, were spent on the construction of Buddhist temples at Dadu and Shangdu. Fresh honors were decreed to the memory of the old sage, and the characters Da Qing were added to his titles.

His administration was founded on the unstable balance between Khayishan, his younger brother Ayurbarwada and their mother Dagi of the Khunggirad clan. Khayishan appointed Ayurbarwada as Crown Prince on the condition that he would pass the status to Khayishan's son after his succession. He generously gave bonuses to imperial princes and Mongol aristocrats and enjoyed popularity among them. Khayishan freely gave away noble and official titles and filled the government with supernumeraries. Having little regard for the unwritten law of Kublai Khan that only the sons of Khagans could be made princes of the first rank, he granted the Genghisids and the non-Borjigins many princely titles. Meanwhile, his administration was plagued with financial difficulties caused by free-spending policies and longstanding military spending, so he brought back the Department of State Affairs (Shangshu Sheng) for financial affairs in parallel with the Central Secretariat (Zhongshu Sheng) for administrative affairs. He changed the branch offices of the Central Secretariat to those of the Department of State Affairs to strengthen the monopoly in salt and other goods and issued new bills (Jiaochao) called Zhida-yinchao (Chinese: 至大銀鈔) to replace Zhiyuan-chao (Chinese: 至元鈔). His anti-inflation plans did not achieve adequate results in his short reign and dissatisfied Han Chinese officers and commoners. He attempted to push through a new nonconvertible silver currency but was defeated by public resistance.

Although he first shared with Ayurbarwada the tutorship of the Confucian scholar Li Meng, he apparently was little affected by Confucian culture. He transferred Harghasun to Mongolia as the grand councillor of the left wing of Branch secretariat of Lin-pei despite his great contribution. Khayishan heavily relied on his retainers and commanders he had brought from Mongolia. He gave key posts to them and favored non-Mongol corps including the Kipchak, the Asud (Alans) and the Qanglï. In contrast, he did not reward abundantly the Khunggirad faction who had carried out a coup against Bulughan. Because Tula said something suspicious in rage, Khayishan suspected that he had a further object, and had him tried and put to death.

Khayishan greatly favored Buddhism, so that he ordered the Tibetan Lama Chogdi Osor to translate the sacred books of Buddha. When the Buddhist monks made mistakes except in cases affecting the Yuan dynasty, he refused to punish them. A law was passed that whoever struck a Lama should lose his tongue, but Ayurbarwada repealed it as entirely contrary to precedent. However, Khayishan was the first Khagan to tax the lands held by the Buddhist monks and the followers of Taoism, hitherto exempt.

In order to reduce the cost of supporting the Yuan bureaucracy, he issued an order in 1307 to dismiss the supernumeraries and to bring total number of officials in line with the quota that had been set by his uncle Temür Khan. The order produced no practical results; the number of bureau's chief officials jumped from 6 in Kublai's reign to 32. He also had the building of court officials and a new palace city built at Dadu and Zhongdu (the ruins of Zhongdu in Zhangbei County can be seen until today).

In 1308, the Goryeo king Chungnyeol of Korea died, and Khayishan sent a patent for his successor Chungseon. That year Chapar and other princes of the Khanate of Ögedei came to Khayishan with their submission, permanently ending the threat against the Chagatai Khanate and the Yuan dynasty by Khaidu's sons. During his reign, the Yuan completed the subjugation of Sakhalin, forcing its Ainu people to accept their supremacy in 1308.

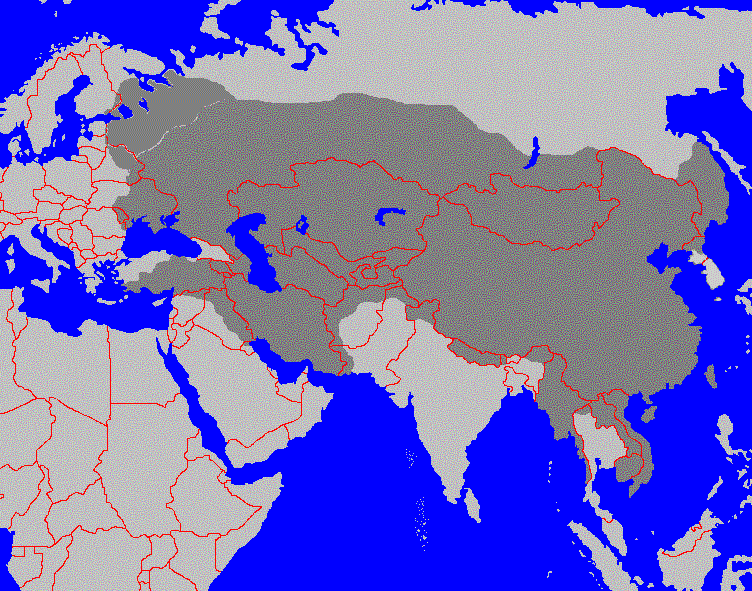
The Mongol Empire and its client states (c. 1311)

In 1308, the court made major readjustments in terms of official salaries. Zhiyuan notes would be used instead of Zhongtong notes. The court also abolished the "salary rice" policy decreed by his predecessor, Temür Khan. The Zhida-yinchao became so depreciated in value that in 1309 there was a fresh issue, made to replace that which was the discredited paper, but this also sank rapidly in value; at length, the Emperor, Khaissan, determined upon a recurrence to the ancient money and, accordingly, in 1310, there were struck two kinds of copper coins having Mongol characters upon them. Some with the inscription, precious money of the Zhida period; and others with this legend, precious money of the Great Yuan. These copper coins were of three sizes: 1 of the value of one li; 2 of the value of ten li; and 3 of coins worth several of those of the dynasties Tang and Song dynasties. Khayishan's court encountered financial difficulties. For example, the total government expenditure for the year 1307 was 10 million ting of paper notes and 3 million dan of grains. By 1310, 10,603,100 ting had been borrowed from the reserves for current expenditures. That same year, to address financial difficulties, he reformed the government's finances by abolishing the office land system and replacing it with salary rice to support the capital. However, the reform caused widespread dissatisfaction especially among government officials. Local officials without office lands received no rice, and court officials lost their rice altogether due to the cancellation of the salary rice policy.

Tula's son Kokechu conspired against the Emperor with the high court officials and Buddhist monks in 1310; but their plans were discovered, the monks were duly executed, and Kokechu was exiled to Korea. Arslan, the governor of Dadu and commander of the kheshig, shared same fate with the conspirators. He was executed with several of his companions.

During Khayishan's reign, all Branch Secretariats were renamed Branch Departments of State Affairs. The new major department of state affairs came under Toghta, the grand councillor of the left, Sanpanu and Yueh shi, managers of the government affairs, and Paopa, the assistant administrator of the right.

The selling price of salt licences issued under the state monopoly was raised by 35 percent over the price in 1307. A grain tax surcharge of 2 percent was imposed on the wealthy families of Chiang-nan. The merits of tax collectors were evaluated on the basis of the percentage increase in the taxes they collected the tax quota at the end of Temür's reign. To fight against inflation, Khayishan's administration established granaries in localities and drastically increased the quota for the maritime shipment of grain from Yangtze valley, reaching 2.9 million shih in 1310. Khayishan reduced the number of chief officials in the Secretariat, the Censorate, the Bureau of Military Affairs, and the Bureau of Transmission as well as supernumeraries in various offices.

== Death ==
After a reign of less than 4 years, Khayishan suddenly died on 27 January 1311. Immediately after his death and Ayurbarwada's succession in 1311, the unsatisfactory Khunggirad faction came together under his mother Dagi and purged pro-Khayishan officials. It also broke Ayurbarwada's promise to appoint Khayishan's son as Crown Prince. His court drove Khayishan's sons Kuśala and Tugh Temür out of the central government. Pro-Khayishan generals cherished grievances until they managed to set up Tugh Temür in 1328 after overthrowing another of Khayishan's relatives, Ragibagh.

== Family ==
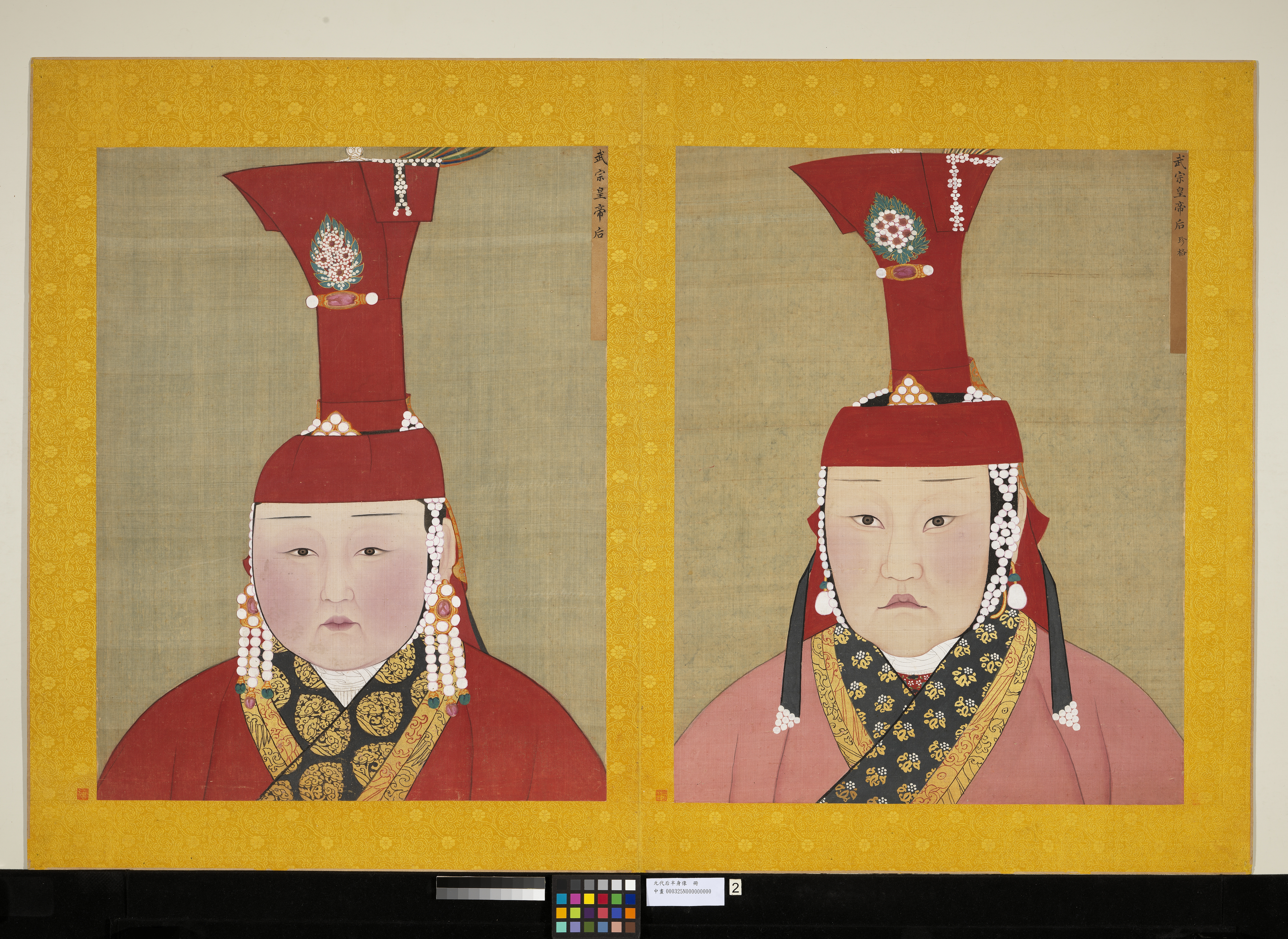
Sugeshili (on left) and Zhenge (on right)

=== Parents ===
- Darmabala, posthumously Shunzong (順宗 答剌麻八剌; 1264 – 1292)
- Dagi (答己; 1262 – 1 November 1322)

=== Wives, concubines, and children ===
- Empress Xuancihuisheng (宣慈惠圣皇后; 1285 – 1327), of the Hongjila clan (弘吉剌氏), from Khongirad, personal name Zhenge (真哥)
- Empress Sugeshili (速哥失里皇后) of the Hongjila clan (弘吉剌氏), from Khongirad, cousin of Zhenge
- Consort Yiqilie, of the Khorchin Borjigin clan (亦乞烈妃子), granddaughter of Kublai Khan
  - Khutughtu, Prince of Zhou (周王忽都篤; 22 December 1300 – 29 August 1329), 1st son
- Consort Tangwu (唐兀妃子), of the Tanguts tribe
  - Jayaatu, Prince of Huai (怀王札牙笃; 16 February 1304 – 2 September 1332), 2nd son

== See also ==
- List of emperors of the Yuan dynasty
- List of Mongol rulers
- List of rulers of China

== Notes ==
Külüg Khan House of Borjigin Born: 1281 Died: 1311
Regnal titles
Preceded by Temür Khan, Emperor Chengzong	Great Khan of the Mongol Empire (Nominal due to the empire's division); 1307–1311	Succeeded by Ayurbarwada Buyantu Khan, Emperor Renzong
Preceded by Temür Khan, Emperor Chengzong	Emperor of the Yuan dynasty Emperor of China; 1307–1311	Succeeded by Ayurbarwada Buyantu Khan, Emperor Renzong
