= Empress Wenxianzhaosheng =

Chinese Empress consort

Empress Wenxianzhaosheng 文獻昭聖皇后
- Empress of the Yuan Dynasty (Posthumously honoured)
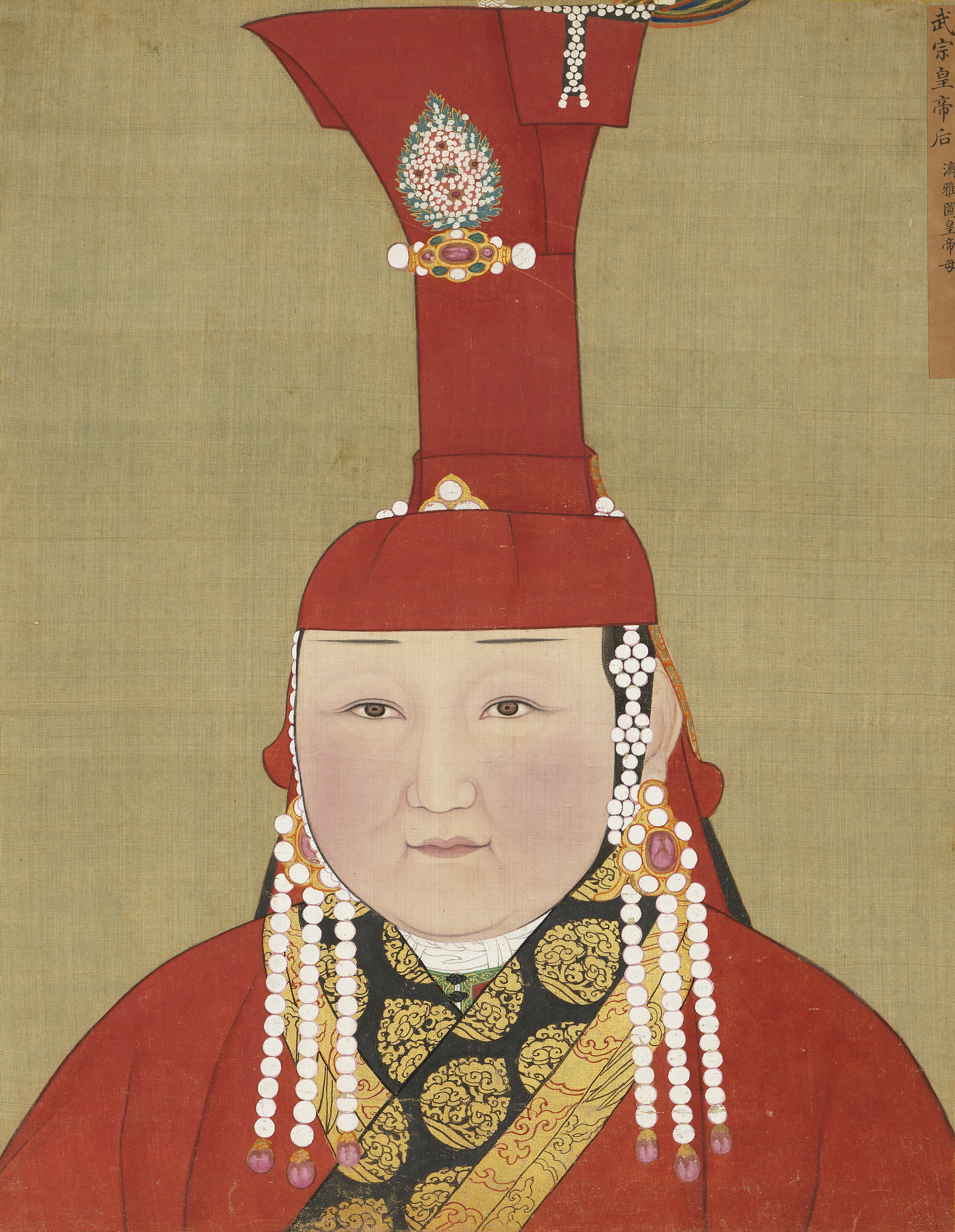
- A portrait of Empress Wenxianzhaosheng from the Yuan Era
- Died: before 1329
- Spouse: Külüg Khan
- Issue: Jayaatu Khan
Posthumous name
- Empress Wenxianzhaosheng (文獻昭聖皇后)

Empress Wenxianzhaosheng (Chinese: 文獻昭聖皇后; pinyin: Wénxiànzhāoshèng Huánghòu, died before 1329) was mother of Jayaatu Khan (Emperor Wenzong), emperor of the Yuan dynasty of China. She was an ethnic Tangut and a concubine of Külüg Khan. She gave birth to the future Jayaatu Khan in 1304.

Her given name is unknown. Her posthumous name "Emperor Wenxian Zhaosheng" was accorded by her son in 1329.
