= Temür Khan =

Emperor of Yuan China from 1294 to 1307

Emperor Chengzong of Yuan; Öljeyitü Khan
- 6th Khagan of the Mongol Empire (Nominal due to the empire's division); Emperor of China (2nd Emperor of the Yuan dynasty)
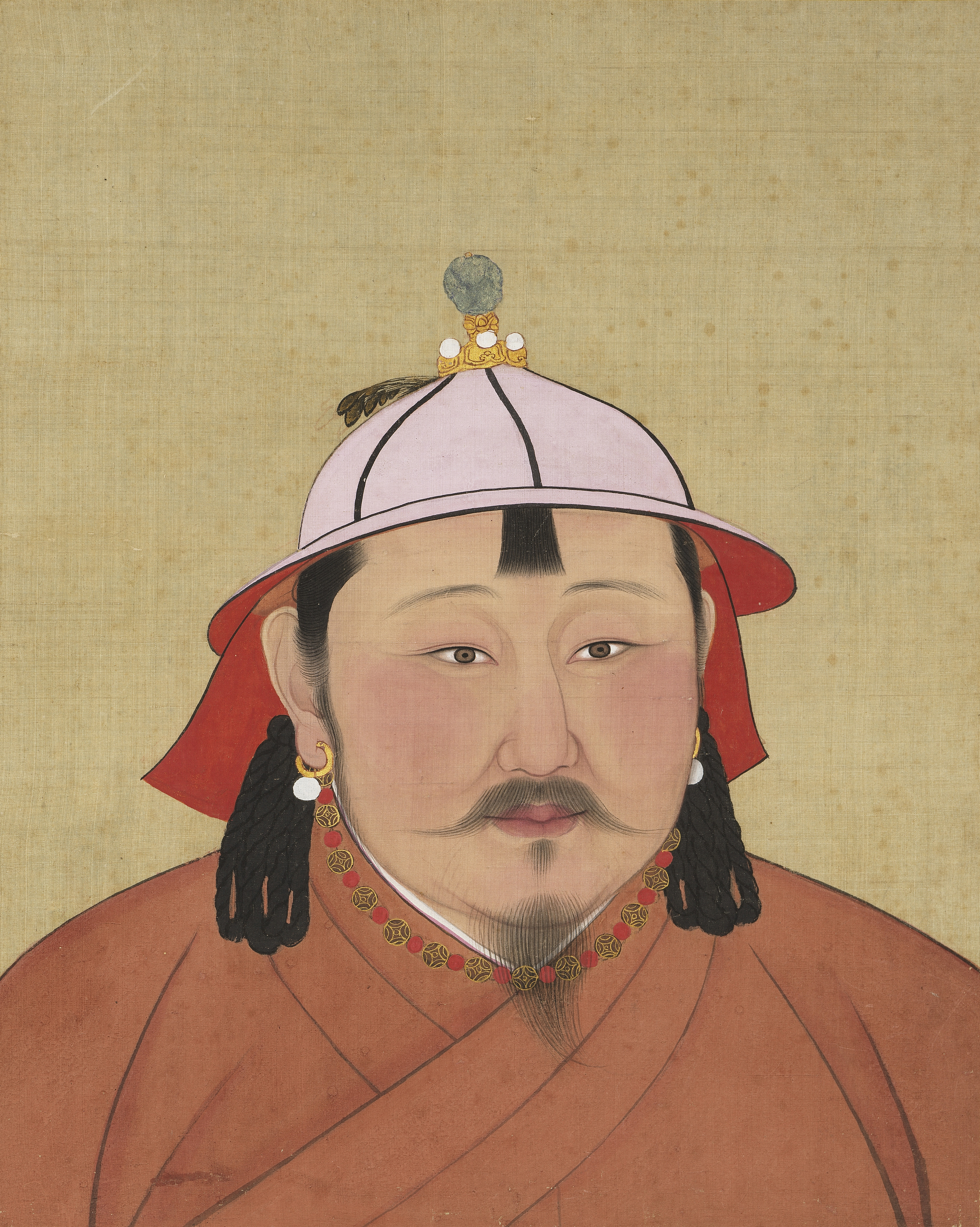
- Portrait of Temür Khan. Original size is 47 cm wide and 59.4 cm high. Paint and ink on silk. Now located in the National Palace Museum, Taipei, Taiwan.

Emperor of the Yuan dynasty
- Reign: 10 May 1294 – 10 February 1307
- Coronation: 10 May 1294
- Predecessor: Kublai Khan
- Successor: Külüg Khan
- Born: 15 October 1265; Dadu, Yuan dynasty
- Died: 10 February 1307 (aged 41); Dadu, Yuan dynasty
- Empress: Empress Shirindari of Khongirad clan (m. 1285; died 1305); Empress Bulugan of Baya'ut clan (m. 1295)
- Issue: Deshou; Güyüg; Ong Temür; Maqabalin
Names
- Mongolian:ᠲᠡᠮᠦᠷ; Chinese: 鐵穆耳; Temür
Era dates
- Yuanzhen (元貞) 1295–1297; Dade (大德) 1297–1307
Regnal name
- Öljeyitü Khan (ᠥᠯᠵᠡᠶᠢᠲᠦ ᠬᠠᠭᠠᠨ; 完澤篤汗)
Posthumous name
- Emperor Qinming Guangxiao (欽明廣孝皇帝)
Temple name
- Chengzong (成宗)
- House: Borjigin
- Dynasty: Yuan
- Father: Zhenjin
- Mother: Kökejin (Bairam egchi)
- Religion: Buddhism

Öljeyitü Khan (Mongolian: Өлзийт Хаан; Mongolian script: ᠥᠯᠵᠡᠶᠢᠲᠦ Öljeyitü; Chinese: 完澤篤汗), born Temür (Mongolian: Төмөр ᠲᠡᠮᠦᠷ; Chinese: 鐵穆耳; 15 October 1265 – 10 February 1307), also known by his temple name as the Emperor Chengzong of Yuan (Chinese: 元成宗; pinyin: Yuán Chéngzōng; Wade–Giles: Yüan^{²} Ch'eng^{²}-tsung^{¹}), was the second emperor of the Yuan dynasty of China, ruling from 10 May 1294 to 10 February 1307. Apart from being the Emperor of China, he is considered as the sixth Great Khan of the Mongol Empire, although it was only nominal due to the division of the empire. He was an able ruler of the Yuan dynasty, and his reign established the patterns of power for the next few decades.

Temür was the third son of the Crown Prince Zhenjin and a grandson of the Yuan dynasty founder Kublai Khan. During his rule, he achieved the nominal suzerainty of all Mongol states of the time. He showed respect for Confucianism, and called off invasions of Burma, Đại Việt, and Japan. His reign was beset by corruption and administrative inefficiencies.

== Early life ==
Named Öljeyitü Khan ("Blessed Khan") in the Mongolian language, Temür ("iron") was born the third son of Zhenjin of the Borjigin clan and Kökejin (Bairam-Egechi) of the Khunggirad clan on 15 October 1265. Because Kublai's first son Dorji died early, the second-born Zhenjin became the crown prince. Zhenjin died in 1286 when Temür was 21 years old. Kublai remained close to Zhenjin's widow Kökejin, who was high in his favor. Like his grandfather Kublai, Temür was a follower of Tibetan Buddhism.

Temür followed his grandfather Kublai to suppress the rebellion of Nayan (Naiyan) and other rival relatives in 1287. Then he and Kublai's official, Oz-Temür, came to guard the Liao River area and Liaodong in the east from Nayan's ally, Qadaan, and defeated him. Kublai appointed Temür the princely overseer of Karakorum and surrounding areas in July 1293. Three Chagatai princes submitted to him while he was defending Mongolia, fleeing to Chagatai Khanate and returning to the Yuan dynasty again during the reign of Temür.

After Kublai Khan died in 1294, Kublai's old officials urged the court to summon a kurultai in Shangdu. Because Zhenjin's second son Darmabala had already died in 1292, there were only two potential successors: Zhenjin's other sons, Gammala and Temür. It was proposed by their mother Kökejin that they hold a competition over who had better knowledge of Genghis Khan's sayings. Temür won and was declared the emperor.

In his early life he was often drunk, but after his grandfather had him caned in public a couple of times, he was "cured" of alcoholism.

== Reign ==
Following in the policies of his grandfather Kublai, Temür was finally able to achieve nominal suzerainty of the entire Mongol realm. However, he failed to improve the corruption and administrative inefficiencies that were endemic during his rule of the empire.

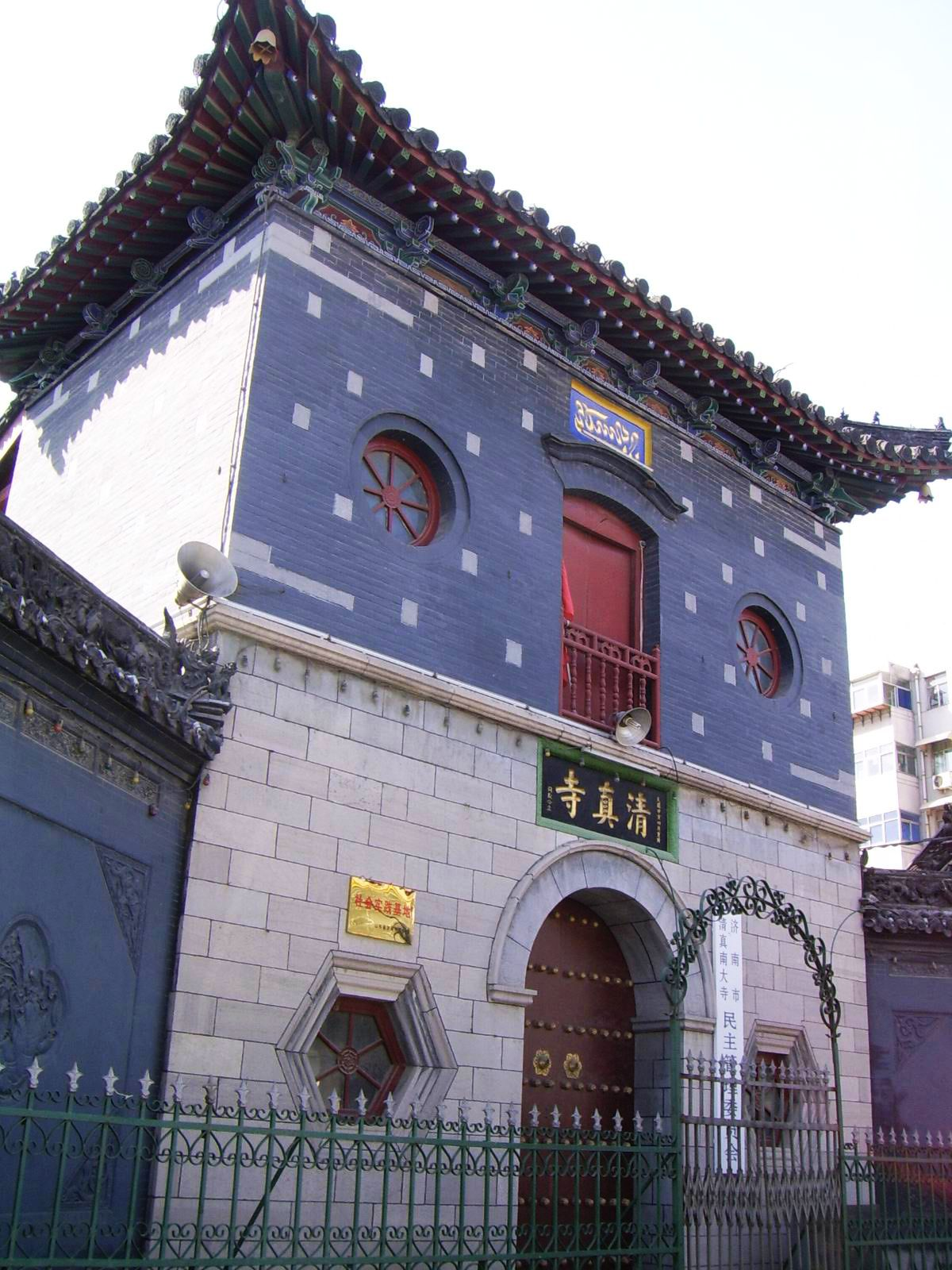
Jinan Great Southern Mosque was completed during the reign of Temür.

Ideologically, Temür's administration showed respect for Confucianism and Confucian scholars. Shortly after his accession, Temür issued an edict to revere Confucius. Temür appointed Harghasun, who was particularly close to the Confucian scholars, right grand chancellor in the secretariat. Nevertheless, the Mongol court did not accept every principle of Confucianism. Temür bestowed new guards and assets on his mother and renamed her ordo (great palace-tent or camp) Longfugong palace, which became a center of Khunggirad power for the next few decades. Mongol and westerner statesmen were assisted by an array of Chinese administrators and Muslim financiers. The most prominent Muslim statesman was Bayan (Баян), great-grandson of Saiyid Ajall Shams al-Din, who was in charge of the Ministry of Finance. Under Mongol administrators Oljei and Harghasun, the Yuan court adopted policies that were designed to ensure political and social stability. Orders were given that portraits be painted of the khagans and khatuns during the reign of Temür.

The number of the Tibetans in the administration gradually increased. The Khon family of Tibet was honored, and one of them became an imperial son-in law in 1296. Temür reversed his grandfather's anti-Taoist policy and made Taoist Zhang Liusun co-chair of the Academy of Scholarly Worthies. In 1304, Temür appointed the Celestial master of Dragon and Tiger Mountain as head of the Orthodox Unity School. He banned sales and distillation of alcohol in Mongolia in 1297, and the French historian René Grousset applauded his activity in the book, The Empire of the Steppes.

Temür was opposed to imposing any additional fiscal burden on the people. Exemptions from levies and taxes were granted several times for part or all of the Yuan. After his enthronement, Temür exempted Dadu (modern Beijing) and Shangdu from taxes for a year. He also exempted the Mongol commoners from taxation for two years. In 1302 he prohibited the collection of anything beyond the established tax quotas. The financial state of the government deteriorated, however, and the draining of monetary reserves greatly weakened the credibility of the paper currency system. Corruption among officials of the Yuan became a problem.

In his 1303 decree, Temür noted that low salaries for officials hinder honesty and suggested adding "salary rice". The Central Secretariat decided to increase salaries for clerks by providing one sheng of rice for each liang of salary notes. Officials earning ten to twenty-five liang would receive one dan of rice, with additional sheng given for higher amounts. In non-rice producing areas, officials received an extra twenty-five liang of Zhongtong notes for each dan of rice due.

During the last years of Temür, a peace among the Yuan dynasty and the western Mongol khanates (Golden Horde, Chagatai Khanate, Ilkhanate) was achieved around 1304 after the Kaidu–Kublai war that had lasted for more than 30 years and caused the permanent division of the Mongol Empire. Temür Khan was recognized as their nominal suzerain. While the peace itself was short-lived and the war soon resumed, this established the nominal supremacy of the Yuan dynasty over the western khanates that lasted for a few decades.

=== Foreign policy: Southeast Asia ===
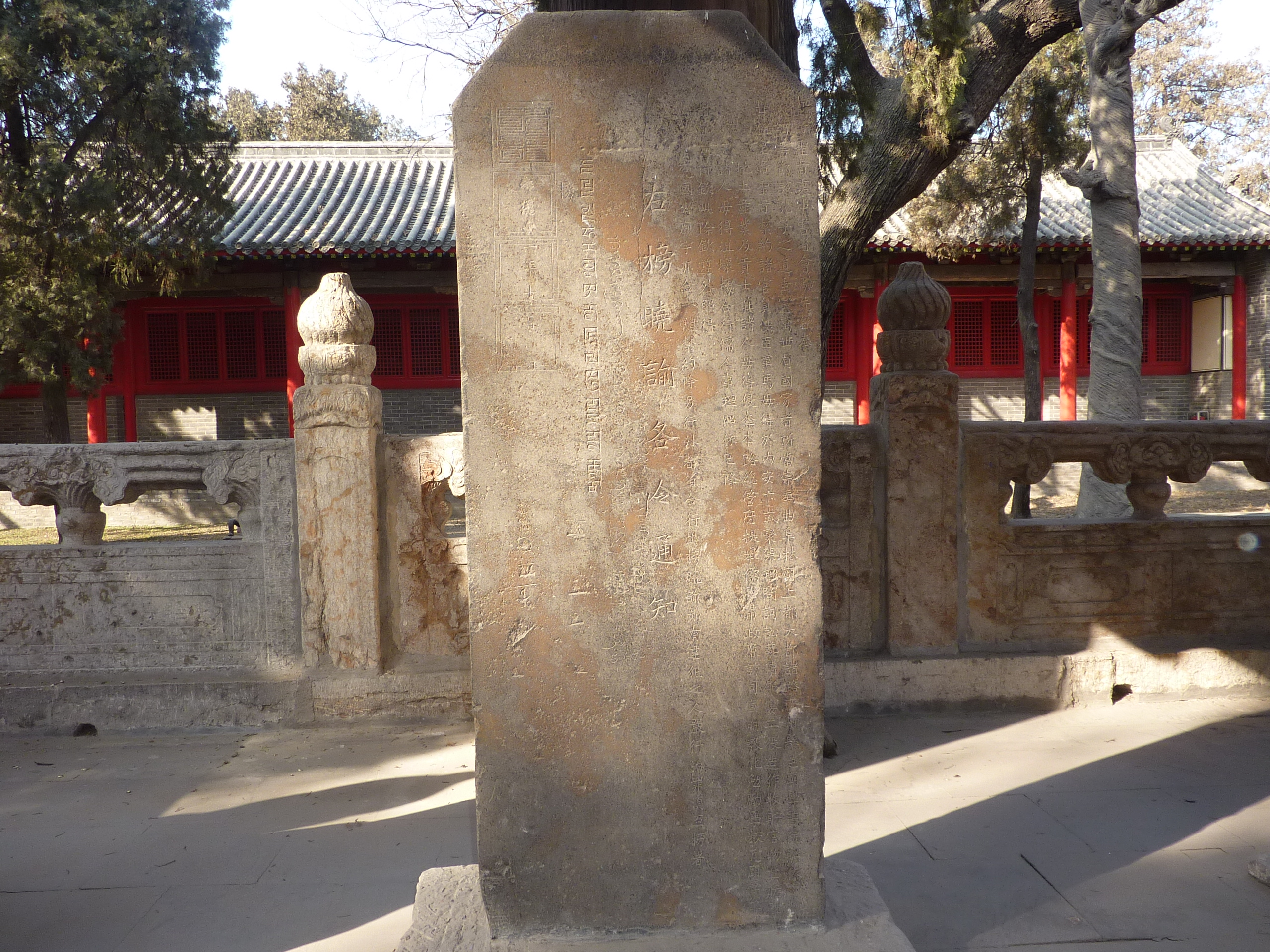
Imperial edict regarding the protection of the Temple of Yan Hui in Qufu, year 11 of the Dade era (AD 1307). The text is in both Chinese and Mongol ('Phags-pa script).

Soon after his enthronement in 1294, Temür called off all preparations for further expansions to Japan and the Đại Việt, whose new ruler ignored his grandfather's envoy in 1291. Temür sent his messengers such as Yishan Yining to Japan and Champa to restore relations, carrying diplomatic documents such as the "Letter from the Yuan dynasty to Japan" (元朝寄日本書). Champa agreed, but the Kamakura shogunate ignored, and the Japanese Wokou also attacked Ningbo late in his reign in 1307. The rulers of Đại Việt, Burma, and Sukhotai visited Dadu to greet him as their nominal overlord in 1295, 1297, and 1300. In response to the visit from the prince of Burma, he aborted the Burmese campaign and said to all his ministers: "They are our friendly subjects. Do not attack their people". Temür also released envoys of Đại Việt to show his goodwill, and the Tran court began to send tributary missions. But Temür's government had to quell rebellions in the southwestern mountainous area, led by tribal chieftains like Song Longji and female leader Shejie in 1296. It took long months for the generals Liu Shen and Liu Guojie to suppress these rebellions.

By the request of the Burmese prince, Tribhuvanaditya, Temür dispatched a detachment of the Yuan army to Burma in 1297. They successfully repelled the Shans from Myanmar. Temür also received envoys from Siam and Cambodia. He dispatched Zhou Daguan to Khmer Cambodia in 1296, and Zhou wrote an account about his journey. In 1299, Athinkaya murdered his brother Tribhuvanaditya, who submitted to Temür in 1297. In 1300, a punitive expedition was launched as the Second Mongol invasion of Burma for dethroning Temür's protectorate, Tribhuvanaditya. The Shan warlords of Babai-Xifu, who were quarreling over the royal succession of Pagan, also raided the Yuan realms. Temür sent his Yunnan-based force in turn to halt the advance of Babaixifu (Lanna Kingdom of Chiangmai) in 1301–1303. Although those campaigns were fruitless, Athinkaya and the Shan lords offered their submission. The costly expedition spurred rebellions of a Yunnan official, Song Longji, and the Gold-Tooths (ancestors of the Dai people) in 1301–1303. The revolts were eventually suppressed. After Temür Khan ordered to withdraw his army from Burma, Central and southern Burma soon came under the Thai rulers who paid nominal tribute to the Yuan dynasty.

== Death ==
Because his only son Deshou died a year earlier (January 1306), Temür died without a male heir, in the capital Khanbaliq on 10 February 1307. While he did not use a Chinese regnal name as Emperor during his two eras of Yuánzhēn (元貞) 1295–1297 then Dàdé (大德), 1297–1307, while Kublai had done so before him, posthumously he became Emperor Qinming Guangxiao (欽明廣孝皇帝) with temple name Emperor Chengzong of Yuan. He was succeeded by Khayishan, a son of his deceased elder brother Darmabala, who ruled as Külüg Khan and Emperor Tongtian Jisheng Qinwen Yingwu Dazhang Xiao (統天繼聖欽文英武大章孝皇帝) with later temple name Emperor Wuzong of Yuan and who made a pact before his coronation for his younger brother Ayurbarwada to be crown prince before any progeny of Khayishan, and then for their descendants to alternate rule; though this pact was broken and Khayishan's descendants persecuted by Ayurbarwada's mother after Ayurbarwada succeeded as Buyantu Khan with later temple name Emperor Renzong of Yuan. A bit downstream, the Khan and Emperor title would pass out of both Temür and Darmabala's descendants to one from their brother Gammala who had been older than Temür but lost out as successor in the competition devised to choose between them.

== Family ==
- Empress Shiriandali, of the Hongjila clan (怜答里皇后弘吉剌氏) from Onggirat, daughter of Oločin Küregen
  - Deshöu, Crown Prince (太子德壽; d. 3 January 1306)
- Empress Bulugan, of the Baya'ut clan (卜鲁罕皇后 巴牙惕氏)
- Empress Huteni, of the Huteni clan (乞里吉忽帖尼)
- Empress Dagi (Dākġarī Khatun), of the Hongjila clan (怜答里皇后弘吉剌氏) from Onggirat
- Unspecified partners produced the following children:
  - Prince Güyüg (Qūyik Tāyšī)
  - Prince Ong Temür (ʿŪng Tīmūr)
  - Prince Maqabalin (Muqābīlān)
  - Princess Chang, personal name Yilihaiya (昌国公主; 益里海雅), first daughter
  - Princess Zhao, personal name Aiyashili (赵国公主; 爱牙失里), second daughter
  - Princess Lu, personal name Puna (鲁国公主普纳), third daughter

== Ancestry ==
Ancestors of Temür Khan

8. Tolui
4. Kublai Khan
9. Sorghaghtani of the Kereyid
2. Zhenjin
10. Anchen Noyan
5. Chabi Khatun
1. Oljeyitu Khagan Temür
3. Kokejin or Bairam egchi

== See also ==
- List of emperors of the Yuan dynasty
- List of Mongol rulers
- List of rulers of China
- Yuan dynasty in Inner Asia

Temür Khan House of Borjigin Born: 1265 Died: 1307
Regnal titles
Preceded by Kublai Khan	Great Khan of the Mongol Empire (Nominal due to the empire's division); 1294–1307	Succeeded by Külüg Khan, Emperor Wuzong
Preceded by Kublai Khan	Emperor of the Yuan dynasty Emperor of China; 1294–1307	Succeeded by Külüg Khan, Emperor Wuzong
