= Manggala =

Prince of Anxi
- Reign: 1272–1278
- Predecessor: Title created
- Successor: Ananda

Prince of Qin
- Reign: 1273–1278
- Predecessor: Last held by Yelü Zongyuan
- Successor: Ananda
- Born: c. 1242
- Died: 1280 (aged 37–38)
- House: Borjigin
- Dynasty: Yuan dynasty
- Father: Kublai Khan
- Mother: Chabi
- Religion: Buddhism

Manggala (Chinese: 忙哥剌; Mongolian: Мангала, ᠮᠠᠩᠭᠠᠯᠠ) was a prince of the Mongol-led Chinese Yuan dynasty. He was a son of the Yuan founding emperor Kublai Khan.

== Biography ==
Manggala was born around 1242 to Kublai Khan and his principal wife Chabi as their second son. He was created Prince of Anxi (安西王) by his father in 1272 and was given an estate in Shanxi. Next year, he was given the additional title of Prince of Qin (秦王). His lands consisted of vast lands containing former Tangut Kingdom, Sichuan and a part of Tibet. Reportedly, he had two courts - a winter court in Jingzhao and a summer residence in Mount Liupan. He was probably overseeing the actions of other princes - Godan (son of Ögedei), Wang Shixian (an Öngüt prince), Jiqu Küregen, Chübei (son of Alghu). His advisors included Shang Ting, Li Dehui (1218–1280) and Zhao Bing (1222-1280). His palaces were described by Marco Polo as massive.

Manggala was a Buddhist, but he also protected the Taoist Quanzhen School, confirmed tax exemption on clergy. He joined the fight against Shiregi with Bayan and other rebels in 1277. Soon in 1280, he died. The cause of his death is not known but a Ming-era historian Zheng Sixiao claimed he was murdered by Kublai.

== Family ==
He was married to Qutui or Putri, granddaughter or niece of Alchi Noyan and had two or three sons and daughter:

1. Ananda (b. 1273, d. 1307) — Prince of Anxi (1278-1307), Prince of Qin (1278-1287)
2. Altan Buqa (d. 1323) — Prince of Qin (1287-1289)
3. Arslan Buqa — only attested in Jami al-Tawarikh
4. Princess Nugulan - married her first cousin Suolanha and gave birth to Shouton (mother of Kusala)

== Sources ==
- Atwood, Christopher P. (2004), Encyclopedia of Mongolia and the Mongol Empire, ISBN 978-0816046713
