= Ayurbarwada Buyantu Khan =

Emperor of Yuan China from 1311 to 1320

Emperor Renzong of Yuan 元仁宗 Buyantu Khan 普顏篤汗 ᠪᠣᠶᠠᠨᠲᠦ ᠬᠠᠭᠠᠨ
- 8th Khagan of the Mongol Empire (Nominal due to the empire's division); Emperor of China (4th Emperor of the Yuan dynasty)
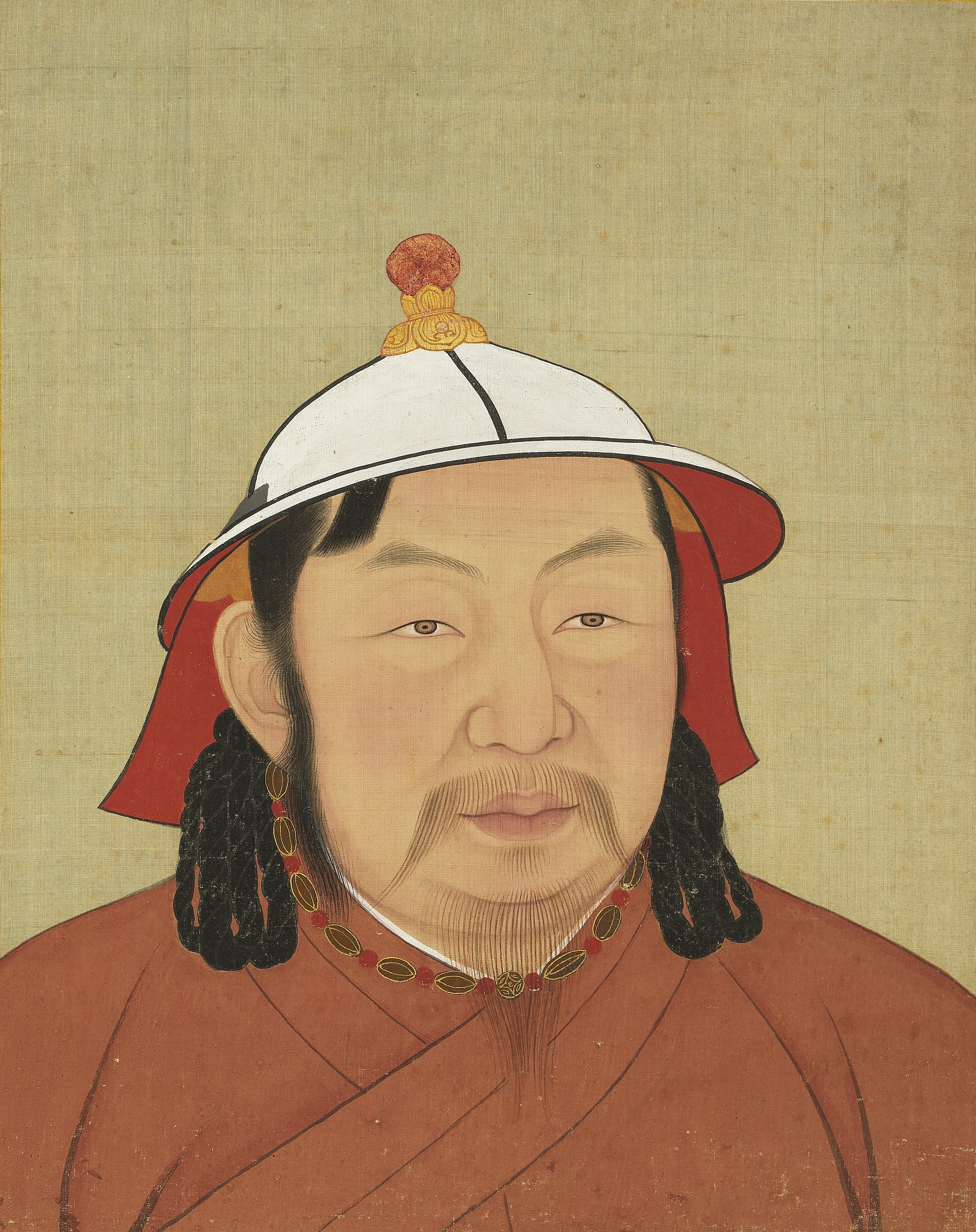
- Portrait of Buyantu Khan (Emperor Renzong) during the Yuan era.

Emperor of the Yuan dynasty
- Reign: April 7, 1311 – March 1, 1320
- Coronation: April 7, 1311
- Predecessor: Külüg Khan
- Successor: Gegeen Khan
- Born: April 9, 1285; Yanqing, Beijing
- Died: March 1, 1320 (aged 34); Dadu, Yuan dynasty
- Empress: Empress Radnashiri of Khongirad clan (m.?–1320)
- Issue: Gegeen Khan
Names
- Mongolian:ᠠᠶᠤᠷᠪᠠᠷᠪᠠᠳᠠ; Chinese: 愛育黎拔力八達; Ayurbarwada
Era dates
- Huangqing (皇慶, imperial celebration) 1312–1313; Yanyou (延祐, extension of benediction) 1314–1320
Regnal name
- Buyantu Khan (ᠪᠤᠶᠠᠨᠲᠤ ᠬᠠᠭᠠᠨ; 普顏篤汗)
Posthumous name
- Emperor Shengwen Qinxiao (聖文欽孝皇帝)
Temple name
- Rénzōng (仁宗)
- House: Borjigin
- Dynasty: Yuan
- Father: Darmabala
- Mother: Dagi Khatun

Buyantu Khan (Mongolian: Буянт Хаан; Mongolian script: ᠪᠣᠶᠠᠨᠲᠦ; Chinese: 普顏篤汗), born Ayurbarwada (Mongolian: Аюурбарбад ᠠᠶᠤᠷᠪᠠᠷᠪᠠᠳᠠ; Chinese: 愛育黎拔力八達), also known by his temple name as the Emperor Renzong of Yuan (Chinese: 元仁宗, April 9, 1285 – March 1, 1320), was the fourth emperor of the Yuan dynasty. In addition to being the Emperor of China, he is regarded as the eighth Great Khan of the Mongol Empire, although it was only nominal due to the division of the empire. His regnal name "Buyantu Khan" means "blessed/good Khan" in the Mongolian language. His personal name "Ayurbarwada" was derived from a Sanskrit compound Āyurpārvata (आयुर्पार्वत), which means "the mountain of longevity", in contrast with Emperor Wuzong's name Qaišan (海山, "mountains and seas" in Chinese).

Ayurbarwada was the first Yuan emperor who actively supported the adoption of Confucian principles into the administration system. The emperor, who was mentored by the Confucian academic Li Meng, succeeded peacefully to the throne and reversed his older brother Khayisan's policies. More importantly, Ayurbarwada reinstituted the civil service examination system for the Yuan dynasty.

== Struggle for succession ==
Ayurbarwada was the second son of Darmabala and Dagi (Targi) of the Khunggirat, and a great-grandson of Kublai Khan (r. 1260–1294). He had been tutored by the Confucian scholar Li Meng, who strongly affected his future political attitudes from his early teens.

In 1305 Bulugan Khatun removed Ayurbarwada from the court and sent him to Honan as the prince of Huai-ning. However, his uncle Temür Khan died without an heir on February 2, 1307, because his son Deshou had died a year earlier before him.

Temür's widow Bulugan of the Bayaud tribe had kept away the Khunggirad-mothered brothers of Khayishan and Ayurbarwada and attempted to set up her favorite, the Muslim Ananda, their uncle and the governor of Ningxia. The Darkhan Harghasun, the right chancellor (Chinese: 右丞相) of the government who became aware of Bulugan's plan, recalled Ayurbarwada and Li Meng from Huaizhou (Chinese: 懷州) to the capital Dadu. They successfully developed a strategy to imprison both Ananda and Bulugan. Afterwards, Ayurbarwada welcomed his older brother Khayishan, who was still far away from Dadu, to succeed to the throne. After the latter's coronation, Ayurbarwada was appointed the Crown Prince in June 1307. The brothers promised each other that their descendants would rule in succession.

== Early career under Külüg Khan and enthronement ==
Ayurbarwada was made head of the top central administrative organs known as the Zhongshu Sheng under his brother and predecessor Khayishan Külüg Khan. He had surrounded himself with the Chinese scholars Chen Hao, Wang I, Wang Yueh, Zhao Mengfu, Wang Chieh, Chan Yaoho, Shang-ye, Yao sui, and Hsia ku; the artists Shang cheng and Wang Cheng-peng; Chagaan, a scholar from Balkh and Haiya, the Uyghur lyricist.

He was able to read and write Chinese and appreciate Chinese paintings and calligraphy in addition to his deep knowledge of Confucianism and Chinese history. Strongly influenced by Confucian political ethics, he was naturally opposed to his brother's exploitative policies. Khayishan's partisans had accused Li Meng of having advised Ayurbarwada to keep the throne for himself; Li Meng left the court immediately after Khayishan's accession. Ayurbarwada spoke out in Li Meng's defence but accomplished nothing much in the end. His disagreement with his brother's high officials remained concealed until his own enthronement.

Khayishan died in January 1311. Unlike the succession struggle over Yuan throne in 1307, Ayurbarwada's succession to his elder brother Khayishan's throne in April 1311 was a peaceful and smooth transition of the Yuan imperial history. This was made possible by the fact that he was designated by Khayishan as the heir apparent in June 1307, in accordance with their earlier agreement, and had subsequently appointed him as the titular head of the Zhongshu Sheng, similar to Kublai Khan had done when grooming Zhenjin to be his successor. He was saluted under the title of Buyantu in his accession kurultai.

== Reformation ==
While one might expect a general continuity in policy and personnel between the two reigns in view of the fraternal love between Khaishan and Ayurbarwada and the peaceful way in which one succeeded the other, what was to happen early in Ayurbarwada's reign was actually the opposite: a political purge of Khaishan's chief ministers and a reversal of most of his policies. These reversals of policies can be traced to Ayurbarwada's cultural and ideological orientation and his uneasy political relationship with his late brother. Strongly influenced by Confucian political ethics as he was, he was naturally opposed to the exploitative policies carried out by the Department of State Affairs under Khaishan.

Ayurbarwada was highlighted for his reform efforts based on Confucianism principle for the Yuan government, though these reforms were made at the displeasure of some Mongol nobility. As soon as he ascended to the throne, he disbanded of the Department of State Affairs set up during Khayishan's reign, which resulted in the execution of 5 high-ranking officials. He also abolished the Zhida paper notes and coins issued by the court of Khayishan; and restored the Zhongtong and Zhiyuan notes as the only official currency. The bureaucracy was trimmed to the 1293 level and new high offices were reduced to the original status they had had in Kublai's reign. The various public building projects of Khayisan were halted. He made Li Meng and Zhang Kui grand councillors in addition to appointing others including Mongols and Semuren (a caste of assorted peoples from Central Asia and the west). The Office of Market Taxes, which was set up to supervise merchants, was abolished with the attempt at abolition by the Semuren. Although he abolished most of Khayishan's policies, converting official salaries into Zhiyuan notes was kept. Aside from that, the court also restored the "salary rice" policy decreed by Temür Khan in 1320. Ayurbarwada decreed that 30 percent of all court officials' salaries were to be paid with rice.

The most prominent reform he made was the reintroduction of the imperial examination system for public officials similar to the one in previous dynasties of China. The imperial examination system, though had repeated been debated during Kublai's reign, had not put into effect until this time. It was now based entirely on Neo-Confucianism, which was thus established as the state philosophy of China for many centuries ever since. A race-based quotas were set for these examinations, allowing a certain number of both Mongol and Han Chinese to enter the government as civil officials. For example, starting in 1313 examinations were introduced for prospective officials – testing their knowledge on significant historical works – in 1315 300 appointments went to the court, with an extra quarter of the positions being given to non-Han Chinese people.

Codification of the law was another area in which Ayurbarwada's efforts to reform the Yuan Dynasty produced the desired results. In the same month that he was enthroned in 1311, he instructed the Zhongshu Sheng to systematize the codes and regulations promulgated since the beginning of Kublai's reign. This compilation and editing was completed in 1316, though the process of reviewing the collection was not completely until 1323, under his son and successor Shidibala, who formally promulgated it under the title Da Yuan Tong Zhi (Chinese: 大元通制, "the comprehensive institutions of the Great Yuan"). In some ways the new code also reflected certain Mongolian customs and the institutional features peculiar to the Mongol dynasty in the history of China.

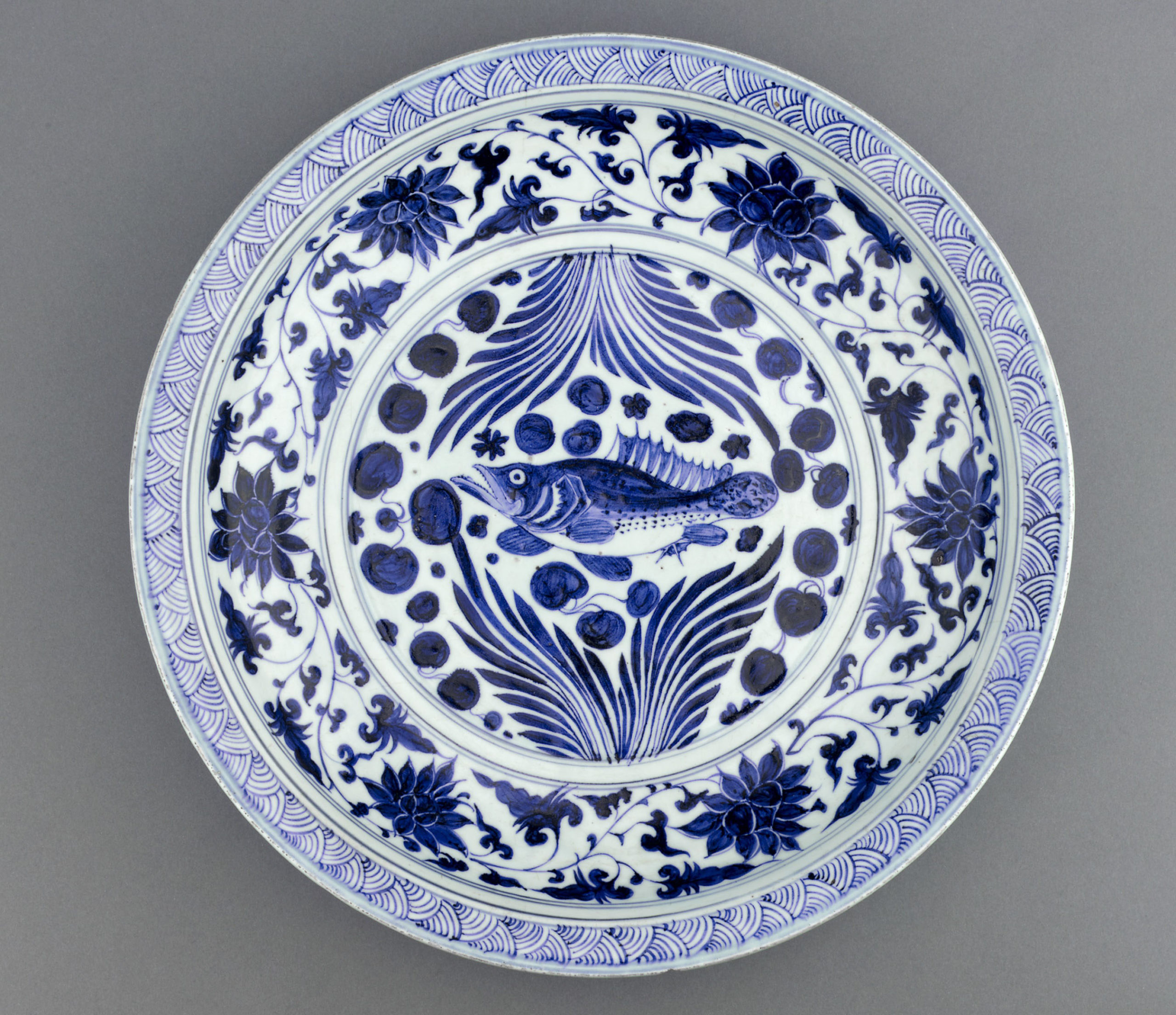
A Yuan Dynasty blue-and-white porcelain dish with fish and flowing water design, mid-fourteenth century, Freer Gallery of Art.

He believed that the Mongol elites and the Semuren had to learn from Confucian political philosophy and Chinese historical experience in order to govern China. During the reign of Ayurbarwada, a number of Chinese books and works were translated or published with Ayurbarwada's authorization. This can also reveal his fondness for Chinese culture and his and his officials' (especially the Mongols and Central Asians) desire to benefit from Confucian political wisdom and Chinese historical experience. Examples of these translated or published books and works include the Confucian classic Shang Shu (Chinese: 尚書, "Book of history"), Daxue Yanyi (大學衍義, "Extended meaning of the Great Learning"), Zhenguan Zhengyao (貞觀政要, "Essentials of the government of the Zhenguan period"), and the Xiao Jing (孝經, "Books of filial piety").

In the winter of 1311 Ayurbarwada ordered the abolition of the jarghuchi (judge) of the princely establishments that was created by Ögedei Khan (r. 1229–1241) and placed all Mongolian violators under the jurisdiction of chienbu while attempting to restrict separate appanage judges. He restricted the position jarghuchi to judicial affairs and organized them under the Court of the Imperial Clan.

Early in his reign Ayurbarwada encouraged agriculture to increase the state revenue. His senior councillor, Temuder, took drastic measures which included collecting salt and iron monopoly taxes and the state monopoly over foreign trade under the Maritime Trade Supervisorate. Despite commercial ties with Europe increased, Ayurbarwada's administration, led by Temuder, unsuccessfully attempted a new cadastral survey called Yanyou Jingli (Chinese: 延祐經理) which involves a comprehensive land survey in 1314. If it had been implemented properly, this survey would have greatly increased the state revenue and helped a more effective tax structure. Ineffective implementation of the survey by corrupt officials caused widespread hardship and resentment. As a result, a serious revolt broke out in Jiangxi in the fall of 1315. Although the revolt was suppressed within two months, it forced the government to abandon the survey program completely to relieve the situation.

Ayurbarwada also granted diploma (yarliq) to exempt the Franciscans from any taxation in 1314. The friars were still expected to pray for the Emperor's life and give their blessing on ceremonial occasions.

Temuder chipped away at the autonomy of the princely appanages and executed Confucian opponents. Since Temuder was viewed by Confucians as an "evil minister", opponents of fiscal centralization charged Temuder with corruption; and Buyantu Khan had to dismiss him in 1317. Unwilling to oppose his mother Dagi (Targi), Ayurbarwada could not eliminate Temuder.

Internationally, Ayurbarwada continued his ancestors' imperialistic policies. He reminded the vassal states of his accession, and told them to remember and send their tribute at the proper time, and assured them that he would make punitive actions if they failed. Among the tributary princes to whom he notified his advent to the throne are named those of Champa, Annam, an island near Japan, Malabar, and kingdoms on the borders of Yunnan.

The reign of Ayurbarwada also saw the Esen Buqa–Ayurbarwada war between the Chagatai Khanate under Esen Buqa I and the Ayurbarwada's Yuan dynasty and its ally the Ilkhanate under Öljaitü. The war ended with the victory for the Yuan and the Ilkhanate, but the peace only came after the death of Esen Buqa in 1318.

== Aftermath ==
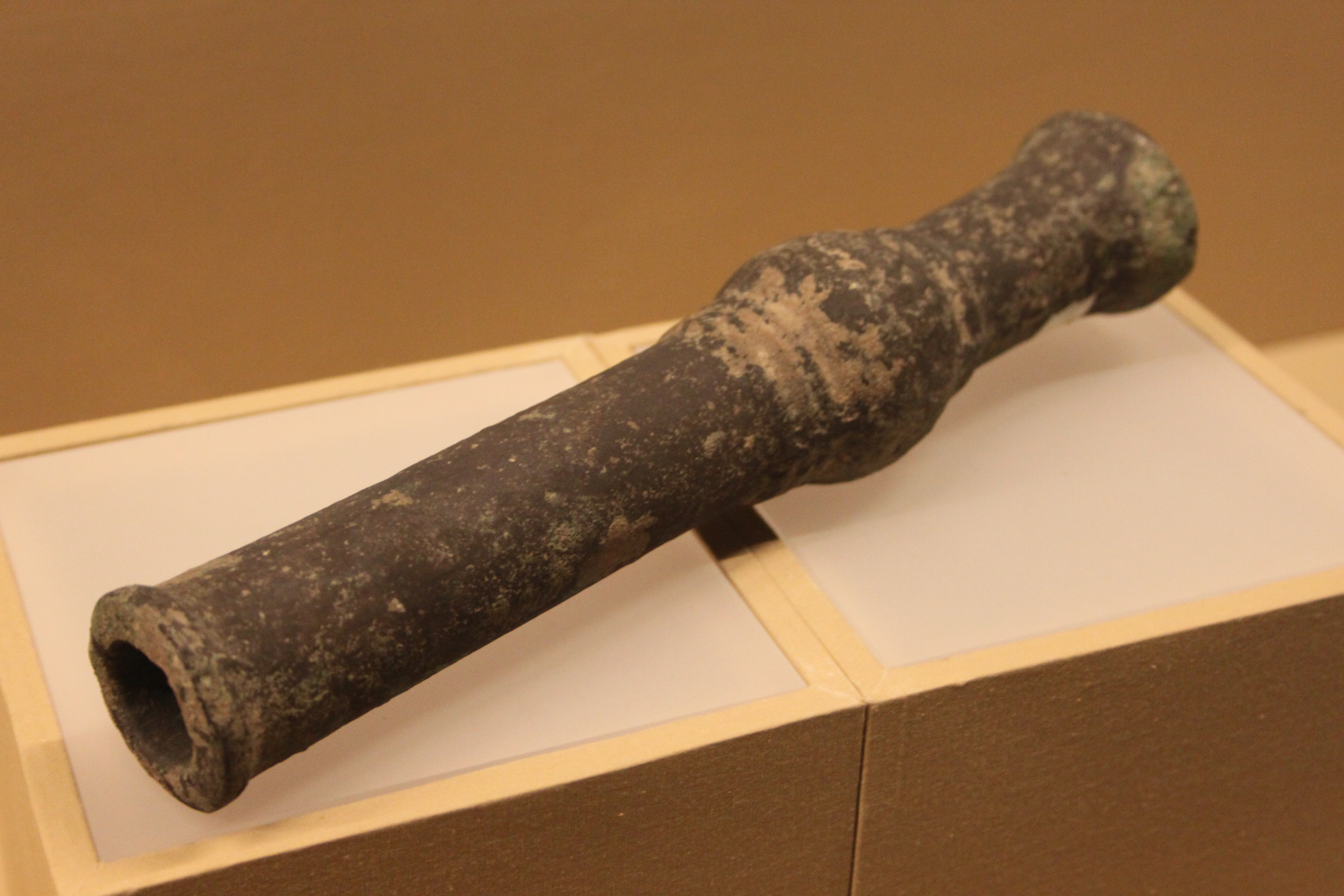
Hand cannon, Yuan dynasty.

Ayurbarwada died on March 1, 1320. After Khayishan died, Ayurbarwada reneged his promise later in his reign by making his own son Shidibala the new Crown Prince in 1316. Therefore, his son succeeded him instead of one of Khayisan's sons.

His death created two decades of political turmoil. The Khunggirat faction under Temuder and Dagi became even more powerful at the court. After the assassination of Shidibala in 1323, none of his descendants ruled the Empire.

== Family ==
He had three consorts, only two gave him sons:

- Radnashiri Khatun, of the Hongjila clan (弘吉剌氏, d. 1322) from Khongirad
  - Shidibala, Crown Prince (碩德八剌太子, 22 February 1302 – 4 September 1323), 1st son
- Dharmashiri Khatun, of the Korean Kim clan (答里麻失里)
  - Udüs Büqa, Prince of Shunyang (順阳王, d.1321), 2nd son
- Bayan Qutugh Khatun, of the Kaesong Wang clan (伯顔忽篤皇后), granddaughter of Wonjong of Goryeo
- Unknown
  - Kökelün, Grand Princess of Lü State (闊闊倫 魯國公主), 1st daughter
    - Married Duoluben Küregen, one of the descendants of Dai Setsen
  - Second daughter

== See also ==
- List of Yuan emperors
- List of Mongol rulers
- List of Chinese monarchs
- Imperial examination

Ayurbarwada Buyantu Khan House of Borjigin Born: 1285 Died: 1320
Regnal titles
Preceded by Külüg Khan, Emperor Wuzong	Great Khan of the Mongol Empire (Nominal due to the empire's division); 1311–1320	Succeeded by Gegeen Khan, Emperor Yingzong
Preceded by Külüg Khan, Emperor Wuzong	Emperor of the Yuan dynasty Emperor of China; 1311–1320	Succeeded by Gegeen Khan, Emperor Yingzong
