= Dhyānabhadra =

Indian Buddhist monk and translator during the late Goryeo dynasty

Zhikong Chanxian
- Dhyānabhadra
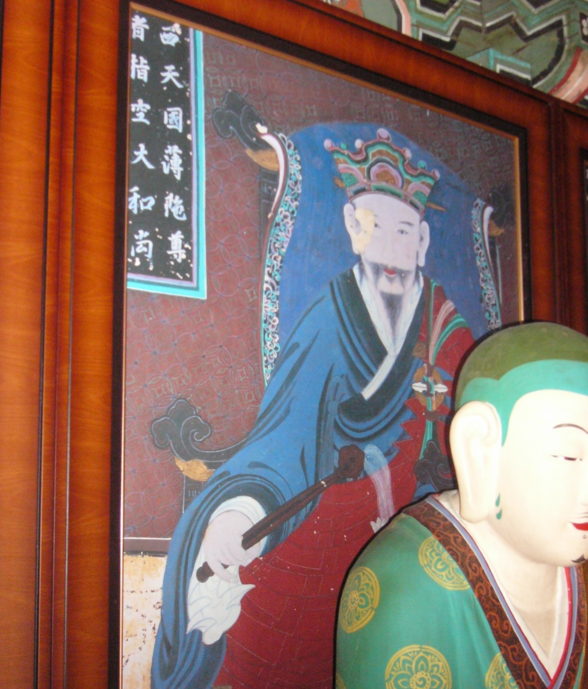
- Portrait of Dhyānabhadra at Silleuksa, South Korea
- Title: 108th Chan Patriarch

Personal life
- Born: c. 1289 CE Magadha (modern-day Bihar, India)
- Died: c. 1363 CE Goryeo
- Education: Nalanda

Religious life
- Religion: Buddhism
- Lineage: Mahayana

Dhyānabhadra (also known as Sunyadisya, Chi-Gong and Zhikong Chanxian) (1289–1363 C.E.) was an Indian Buddhist monk and translator who was originally ordained at the monastery of Nalanda.

Later in life, he travelled throughout the Indian subcontinent and eventually reached East Asia arriving first in Tibet and later to China and Korea during the period when the Yuan dynasty was ruling the regions. He was affiliated with the Mahayana school of Buddhism. Along with Śāriputra (1335-1426 CE) and Vanaratna (1384-1468 CE), Dhyānabhadra is among the last recorded Indian Buddhist figures of the pre-modern era. Dhyanabhadra has also been cited as evidence for the continuing operation of Nalanda following its sacking by Muhammad Bakhtiyar Khilji in 1200 CE.

== Sources ==
Much of what we know about Dhyanabhadra comes from a collection of primary sources from both China and Korea as well as an inscription left on his funeary stupa ten years after his death. The primary sources include:

- Record of Chan Essentials by the Monk Zhikong (Chanyao lu)
- Zhikong’s Travel Record (Xinglu)
- Zhikong’s Text of the Precepts of (Neither Arising Nor) Non-arising (Wushengjie Jing)

== Life ==
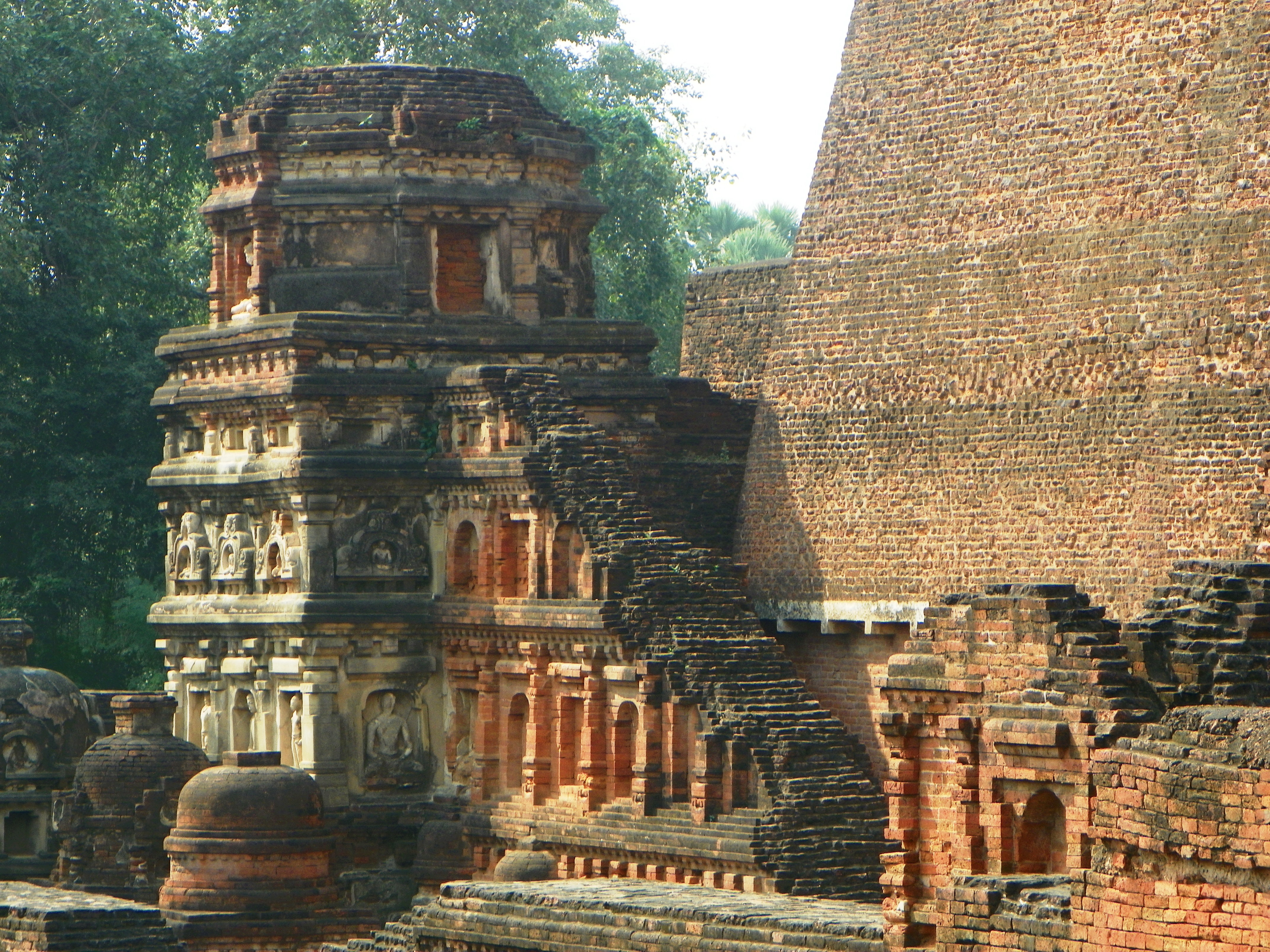
Nalanda Mahavihara, where Dhyānabhadra was ordained as a monk at the age of eight

=== Education ===
Korean sources including the writings of Yi Saek detail that Dhyānabhadra was born as the third son of a minor chief named Pūrṇa in the Magadha region in 1289 CE. His grandfather was the King of Kapilavastu and his mother was a princess from Kanchi. Dhyānabhadra grew up in a period when much of India had begun to feel the threat of Islamic invasions. The sources from his life detail that Dhyānabhadra had a natural affinity for asceticism from an early age. He was able to memorise many religious texts and also avoided foods that were said to "arouse the passions" including meat and alcohol.

At the age of eight, his father, the king, became ill and his mother was advised by a fortune teller that he would recover if her son was ordained as a monk. Her mother then made the difficult decision to enrol Dhyānabhadra at Nalanda monastery at some point between 1295 and 1298 where he studied under the guidance of the Mahayana teacher Vinayabhadra. As part of his initiation at Nalanda, his head was shaven and he received the five precepts. In Nalanda, Dhyānabhadra received an education in various texts including the Maha-Prajñāpāramitā-sūtra, Lotus Sutra and the Buddhāvataṃsaka Sūtra. He was also required to familiarise himself with non-Buddhist teachings.

Vinayabhadra encouraged him to travel to Sri Lanka where he was to study under a monk named Samantaprabhāsa who resided in Sigiriya so that he could study the "meaning of truth" in more detail. On his journey to Sri Lanka, he travelled through regions like Radha in Bengal and Dantapuram in Odisha. In Dantapuram, he is said to have converted the "promiscuous and naked men and women" to Buddhism. After this, he arrived in the city of Kanchipuram in South India where he engaged in a debate with a master of the Avatamsaka-sūtra. After six months of study with Samantaprabhāsa in Sri Lanka, he travelled back and forth between the southwest part of the subcontinent and Sri Lanka. After a final visit to Sri Lanka, Dhyānabhadra travelled northward from the southern tip of India up the western coast. He made attempts to proselytise Buddhism among the Hindus and Muslims that he came across but had mixed success. In the country of Drāvati, the people were more open to Buddhism but in Karana he experienced hostility. Dhyānabhadra then travelled through the countries of Sindh, Jalandhar and Kashmir. In Kashmir, he found that the people "greatly revered Buddhism" although some followed "heretical views" and he attempted to convert them to his teachings.

Following his stay in Kashmir, he travelled through Anavapata, Tirhut and Tehri. Dhyānabhadra did not stay in Tirhut as he commented in his writings that "Brahmanism" was the dominant belief system in the region. Once he reached Nepal, the local King, who was aware of his fame and knowledge, brought him to his palace to lecture on the dharma.

=== East Asia ===
In 1314, he travelled from Nepal to Tibet where he encountered difficulties crossing the Himalayas surviving only on wild fruits. Upon his arrival in Tibet, he joined with another North Indian monk called Mahāpandit and they endeavoured to travel to Yuan China together. The winter capital of the Yuan was Khanbaliq (also known as Yanjing) and Dhyānabhadra stayed with Mahāpandit only for a short time. He travelled through different parts of Yuan China with the goal being to proselytise the people, particularly around the frontier regions where the locals had little to no exposure to Buddhist teachings. One of these regions was Yunnan where he spent five to seven years finally leaving around 1320.

He also travelled to Korea where he founded the Hwaeomsa Temple in 1328, modelled on Nalanda. He was frequently recalled from Korea by Yuan emperors, Yesün Temür and Ragibagh Khan, to serve in their courts. In total, he spent two years and seven months in Korea, travelling across the country. A stupa inscription claims that he died in Korea in 1363/1366 C.E. During his time travelling through China and Korea, it was suggested that he also had a role in instigating revolts against the ruling Mongols. He also had audiences with the Mongol rulers of the Yuan dynasty. 10 years following his death, and after the Mongols had been overthrown from Korea, his disciples erected a stupa on top of his remains. Much of what we know about him comes from the poetic inscription left on his stupa.

He was so revered in Korea that after he died in 1363, King Gongmin of Goryeo had his relics brought back to the country where they were first placed in the royal palace and later placed at the Hoemsa temple.

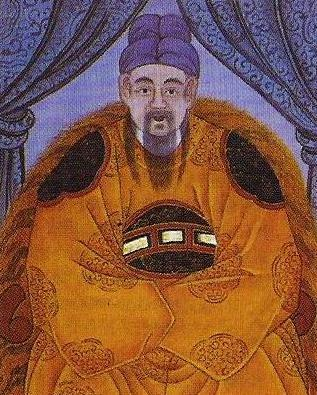
Gongmin of Goryeo

== Teachings and practice ==
=== Primacy of the Precepts ===
Dhyānabhadra placed a significant emphasis on the precepts as a core element of Buddhist practice. He viewed precepts not merely as rigid rules but as tools for guiding practitioners toward enlightenment. Dhyānabhadra’s perspective on precepts was rooted in their potential to act as a "focusing mechanism" that eventually leads to the realisation of their ultimate emptiness. He argued that while precepts are initially engaged with as part of the samsaric world, they must ultimately be transcended as one approaches enlightenment. For Dhyānabhadra, following precepts involves both adherence and a deeper understanding of their conventional and ultimate significance. After realisation, the practice of precepts transforms into an expression of the "True Mind" of the Buddha, which transcends dualistic notions of right and wrong.

=== Confronting Heterodoxy ===
Dhyānabhadra actively confronted "heterodox" practices throughout his life. He encountered various forms of heterodoxy in his travels across different regions, including practices that deviated from orthodox Buddhist teachings. Dhyānabhadra’s method of confronting these practices was direct and often involved using his ethical fortitude as a teaching tool. For instance, he once resisted temptation in a challenging situation to demonstrate the strength of Buddhist ethics. Additionally, he employed his understanding of Buddhist teachings to challenge and correct misconceptions and erroneous practices among different groups. In some instances, Dhyānabhadra's approach was assertive, using physical actions to convey the seriousness of adhering to the correct path.

=== Meditation ===
Meditation was another crucial component of Dhyānabhadra’s practice, though his interpretation was distinctive. He described meditative contemplation as a state that transcends dualities and conventional practices. For Dhyānabhadra, true meditation was not simply sitting in silence or avoiding the material world; instead, it was a dynamic and all-encompassing state of awareness that resided beyond ordinary distinctions. This view reflects his broader philosophical approach, which often negated simplistic definitions and emphasised a deeper, more integrated understanding of practice. Dhyānabhadra’s teachings on meditation also highlight the importance of maintaining awareness in all activities, rather than restricting meditation to formal sitting practice.

== See also ==
- Hyecho
- Marananta
- Silk Road transmission of Buddhism
- Wang ocheonchukguk jeon
