= Five Pagoda Temple (Hohhot) =

Buddhist temple in Hohhot, China

- Precious Pagoda of the Buddhist Relics of the Diamond Throne
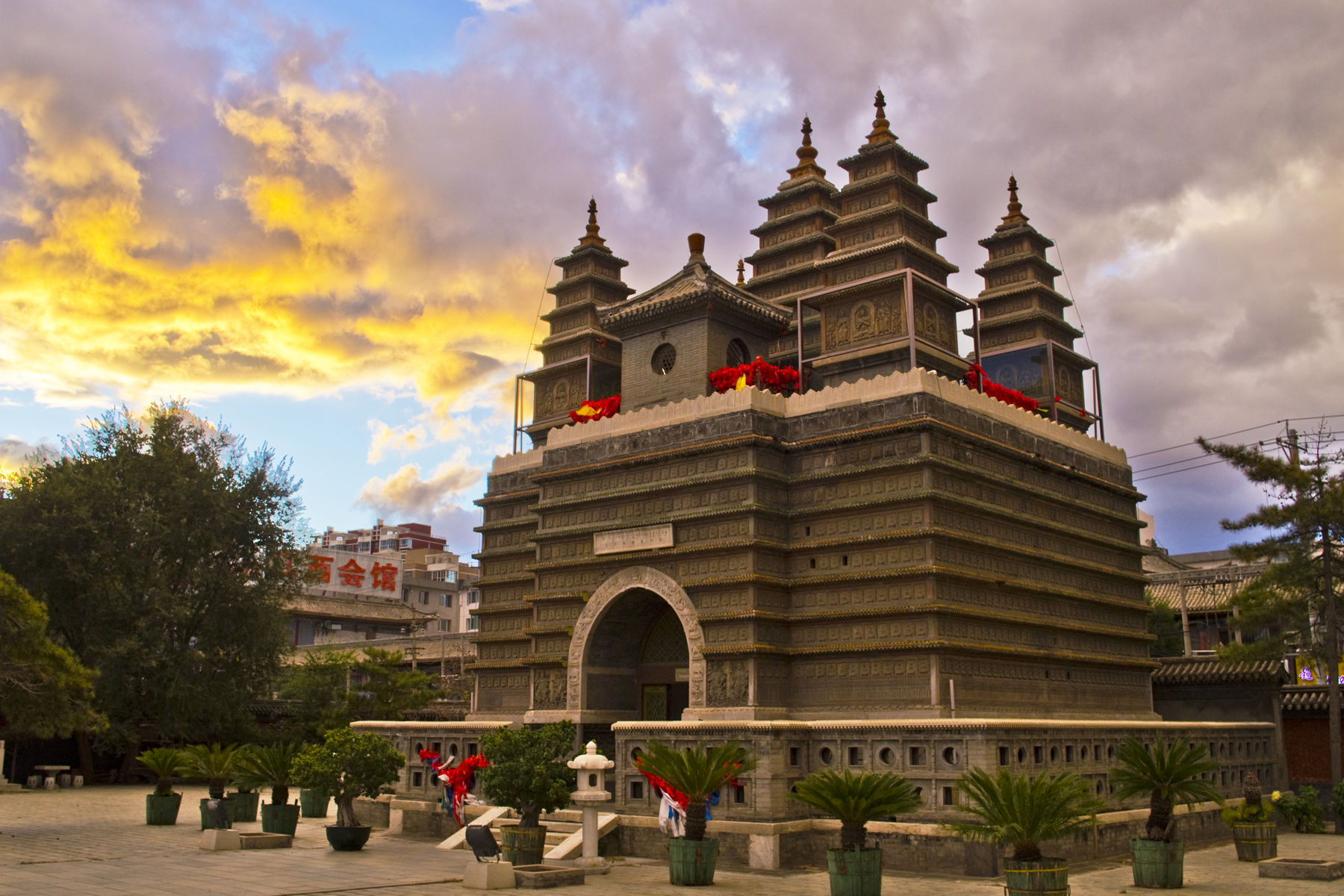
- Temple of the Five Pagodas in Hohhot

- Location in Inner Mongolia

Religion
- Affiliation: Tibetan Buddhism

Location
- Country: China
- Interactive map of Five Pagoda Temple
- Coordinates: 40°47′55″N 111°39′27″E

The Five Pagoda Temple (Chinese: 五塔寺; pinyin: Wǔ Tǎ Sì; Mongolian: Tabun suburγan-u süm-e), also known as the "Precious Pagoda of the Buddhist Relics of the Diamond Throne" (Chinese: 金刚座舍利宝塔; pinyin: Jīngāngzuò Shèlì Bǎotǎ), is a Buddhist temple in the city of Hohhot in Inner Mongolia in north-west China. It is located in the older part of the city in the vicinity of Qingcheng Park.

The construction of the pagoda by the Mongol monk Yangcarci began in 1727 and was completed in 1732.

The stupa, which is situated at the northernmost part of the temple complex, is surmounted by five pagodas and has 1,563 images of Buddhas carved into its walls each one differing slightly from the other. Against the northern wall, outside the stupa, one can find three large stone carvings representing:

- the wheel of life (left),
- a representation of the universe according to Buddhist cosmology (middle), and
- a rare Mongolian cosmological map, which illustrates the zodiac and positions of numerous stars. It is the only such map discovered yet in China from this era.

== See also ==
There are a total of six temples in the style of a "diamond throne pagoda" in China (Five Pagoda Temples). The other five temples are:

- Temple of the Azure Clouds in Beijing
- Yellow Temple in Beijing
- Zhenjue Temple in Beijing
- Miaozhan Temple in Kunming, Yunnan Province
- Guanghui Temple in Zhengding, Hebei Province
