= Yuanzhao Temple =

Buddhist temple in Shanxi, China

- 圆照寺
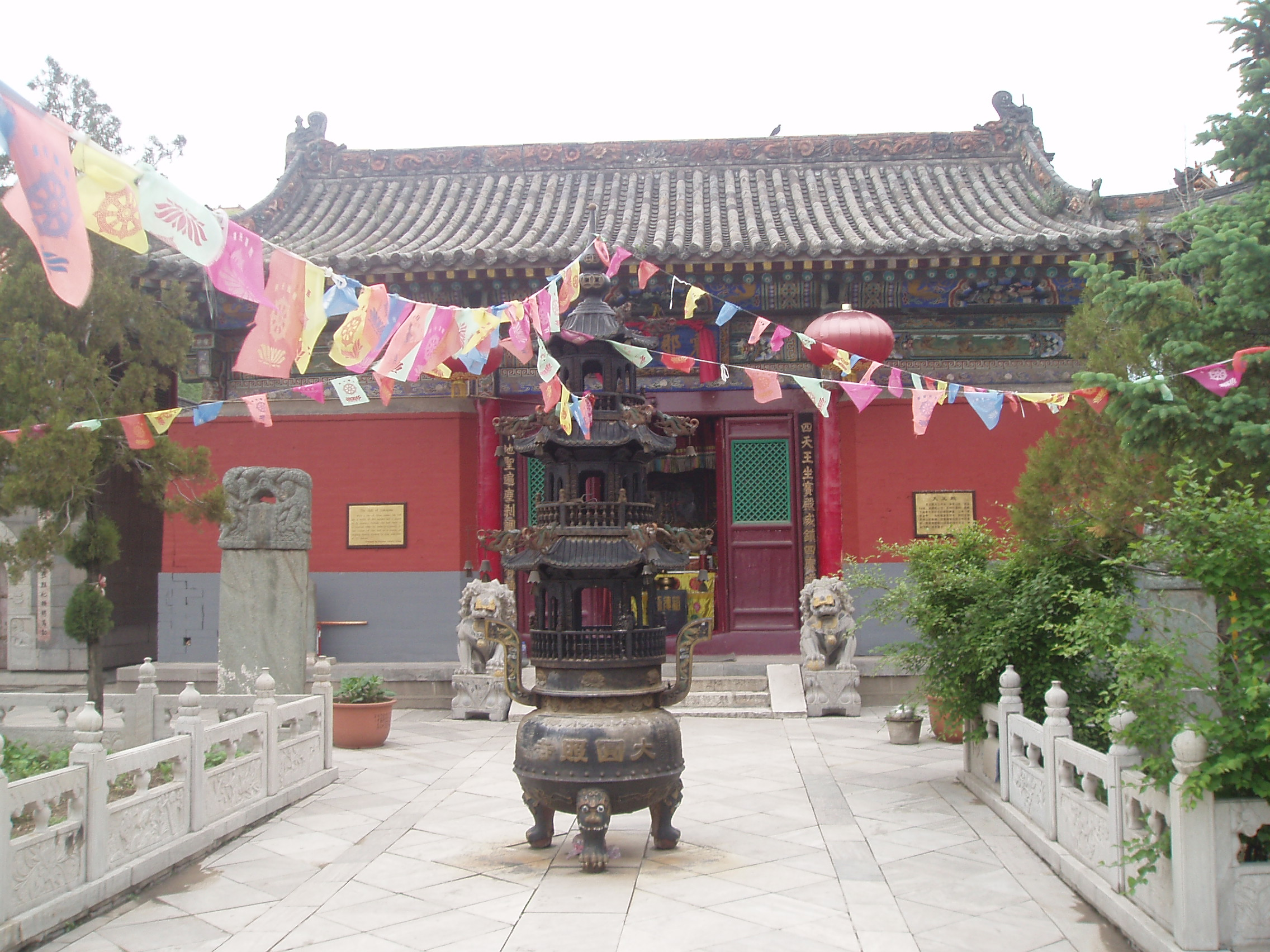
- The Hall of Lokapala at the Yuanzhao Temple.

- Location within Shanxi

Religion
- Affiliation: Buddhism
- Prefecture: Wutai County
- Province: Shanxi
- Deity: Tibetan Buddhism

Location
- Country: China
- Interactive map of Yuanzhao Temple
- Prefecture: Wutai County
- Coordinates: 39°00′55″N 113°36′11″E

Architecture
- Style: Chinese architecture
- Established: Yongle period (1403-1424)

Yuanzhao Temple (simplified Chinese: 圆照寺; traditional Chinese: 圓照寺; pinyin: Yuánzhào Sì) is a Buddhist temple located in Taihuai Town of Wutai County, Xinzhou, Shanxi, China.

== History ==
In the early years of Yongle period (1403-1424) of Ming dynasty (1368-1644), the Nepalese Buddhist monk Shilisha (室利沙) came to China to preach Buddhism. To commemorate him, Xuande Emperor (1399-1435) gave orders to build a Buddhist temple in Mount Wutai.

== Architecture ==
Along the central axis are Shanmen, Hall of Four Heavenly Kings, Mahavira Hall and Dugang Hall. There are over 10 halls and rooms on both sides, including wing-room and dormitory.

=== Shanmen ===
Shanmen are usually built in a row with a big one in the middle and two small ones on two sides, but the shanmen of Yuanzhao Temple are built in a row with a big one in the middle and four small ones on two sides, so the shanmen are known as the Wuchaomen (五朝门). On both sides of the shanmen there are two Chinese guardian lions. The hall has a width of 26 metres (85 ft) and a depth of 18 metres (59 ft), the construction area is 495 square metres (5,330 sq ft).

=== Hall of Four Heavenly Kings ===
The Maitreya Buddha and Four Heavenly Kings' statues are enshrined in the Hall of Four Heavenly Kings. They are the eastern Dhṛtarāṣṭra, the southern Virūḍhaka, the western Virūpākṣa, and the northern Vaiśravaṇa. Inside the hall, two plaques with Chinese couplet are hung on the two side pillars. It says "出则弘称，六度化七趣，同归正党；人以德量，三脱疑四圣，共证泥洹". The hall has a width of 19.8 metres (65 ft) and a depth of 13 metres (43 ft). Under the eaves is a plaque written by Qianlong Emperor (1735-1796) in the Qing dynasty (1644-1911).

=== Mahavira Hall ===
The Mahavira Hall is the second hall and main hall in the temple. In the middle is the statue of Sakyamuni, statues of Amitabha and Bhaisajyaguru stand on the left and right sides of Sakyamuni's statue. The statue of Manjushri is placed in front of the statue of Sakyamuni. The statues of Eighteen Arhats stand on both sides of the hall.

=== Dugang Hall ===
The Dugang Hall (都纲殿) is the third hall of the temple for the worship of a statue of the Indian Buddhist monk Śāriputra/Shilisha. The name of Dugang Hall derives from an official position title "Dugang" (都纲) of the Later Qin (384-417), which in charge of Buddhist temples, Buddhist monks and bestowal of office.

=== Stupa ===
The stupa of Śāriputra in the backyard of the temple, built in 1434, is the earliest Diamond Throne Pagoda in China. The height is about 16.67 metres (54.7 ft).

== Gallery ==
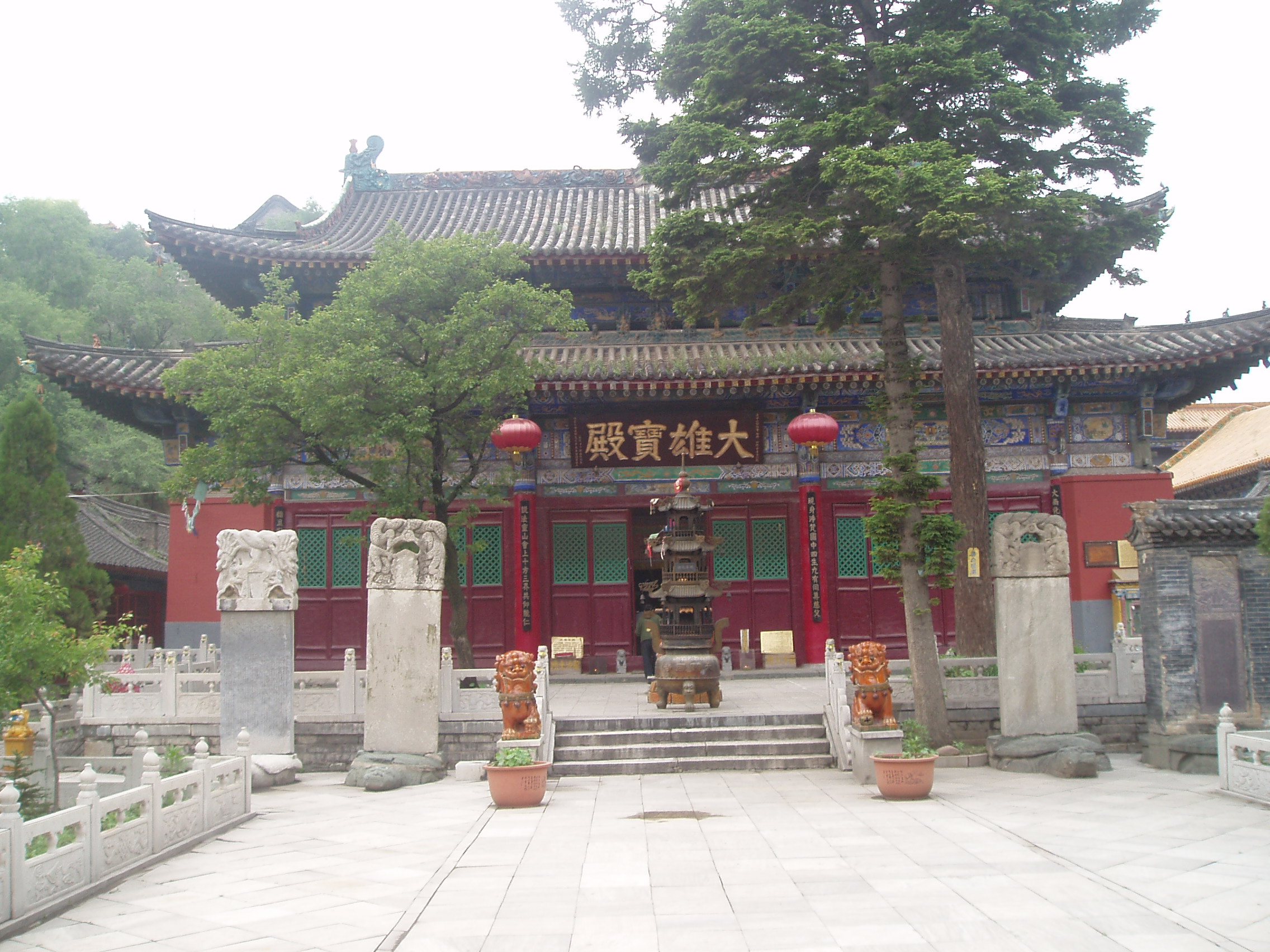
The Mahavira Hall at Yuanzhao Temple.

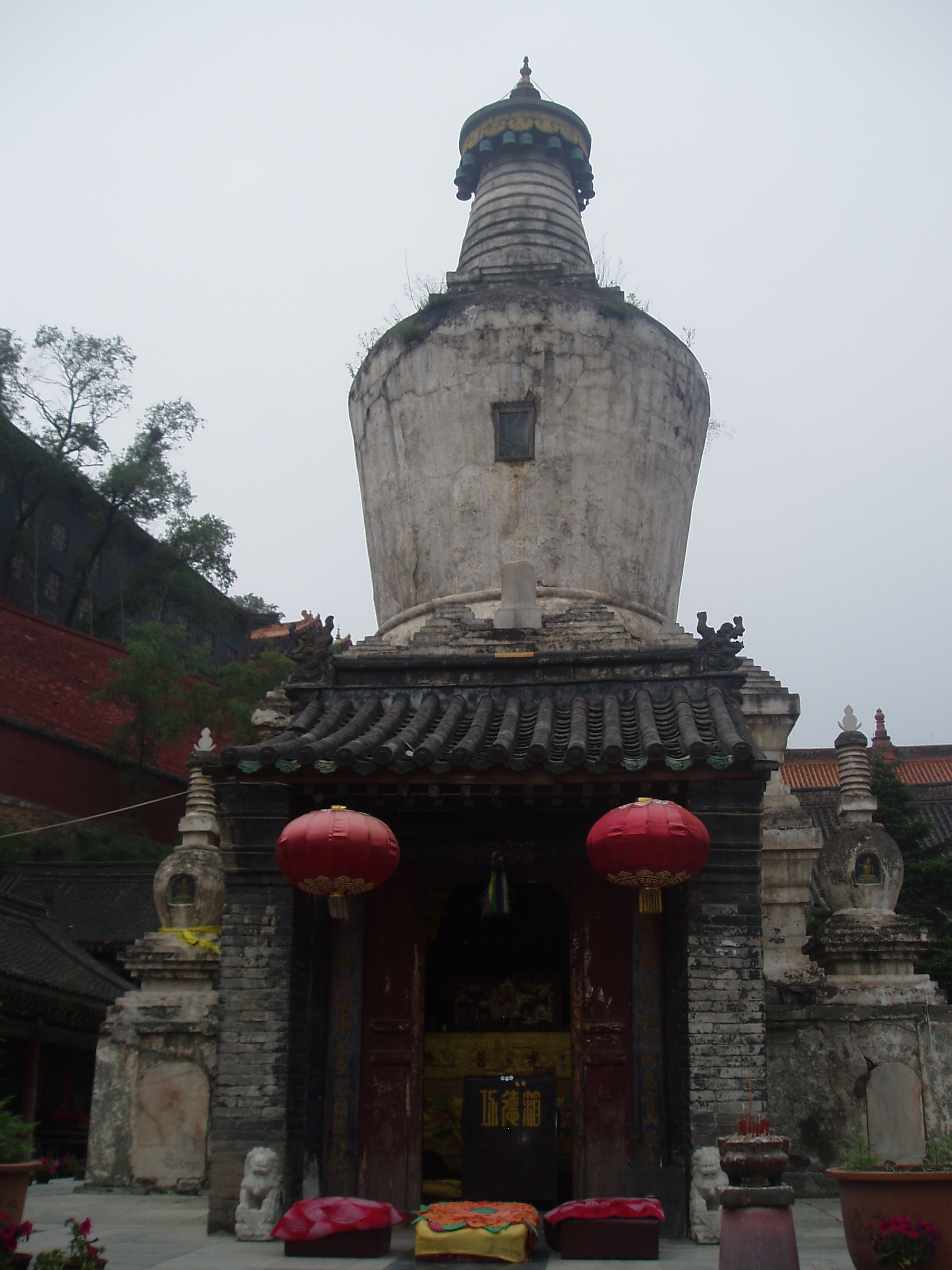
The stupa of Shilisha in the backyard of Yuanzhao temple.
