= Emperor Tianshun =

Emperor Tianshun may refer to emperors of China who used the era name Tianshun (天順):

- Ragibagh Khan (1320–1328, reigned 1328), emperor of the Yuan dynasty
- Emperor Yingzong of Ming (1427–1464, reigned 1435–1449 and 1457–1464), emperor of the Ming dynasty
