= Lingbei (Yuan province) =

Historical province of China

Lingbei 嶺北等處行中書
- Province of Yuan dynasty
- 1271–1368
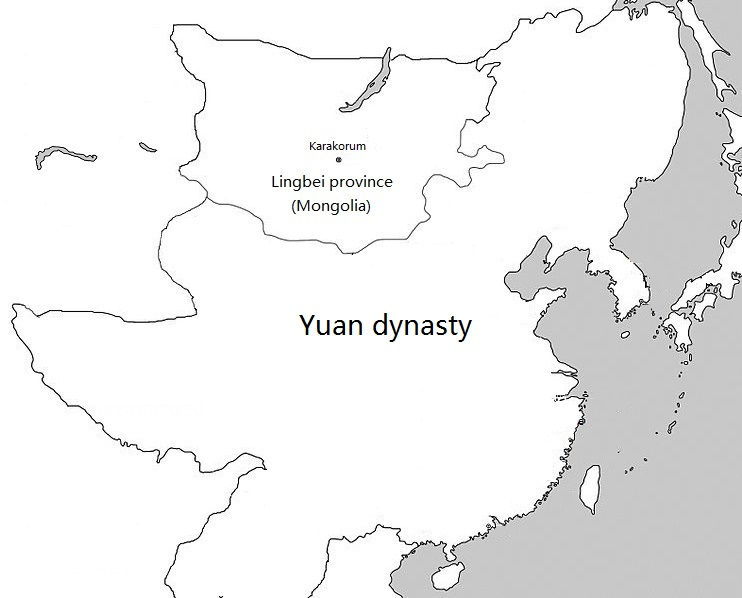
- Lingbei in the Yuan dynasty
- Capital: Karakorum
- Government
  - Type: Yuan hierarchy
- History
  - Established: 1271
  - Disestablished: 1368
Preceded by	Succeeded by
Mongol Empire	Northern Yuan dynasty
- Today part of: China; Russia; Mongolia

The Yuan dynasty ruled over the Mongolian Plateau, including both Inner and Outer Mongolia as well as part of southern Siberia, between 1271 and 1368. The Mongolian Plateau is where the ruling Mongol Borjigin clan of the Yuan dynasty came from, thus it enjoyed a somewhat special status during the Yuan dynasty, although the capital of the dynasty had been moved from Karakorum to Khanbaliq (modern Beijing) since the beginning of Kublai Khan's reign, and Mongolia had been converted into a regular province, known as the province of Lingbei (Chinese: 嶺北行省), by the early 14th century.

== History ==
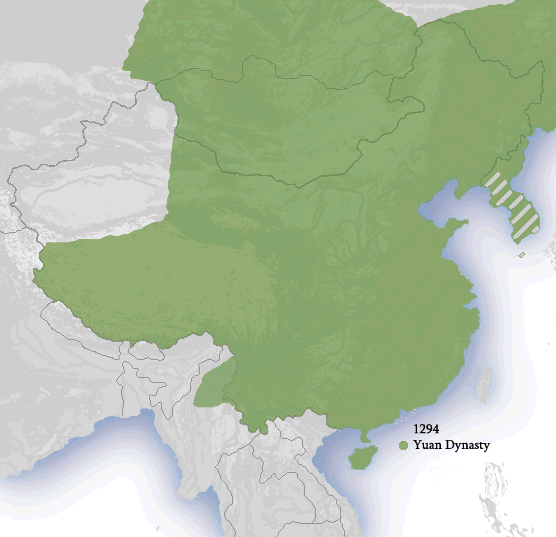
Yuan dynasty, c. 1294.

The Mongols came from the Mongolian steppe, and Karakorum was the capital of the Mongol Empire until 1260. During the Toluid Civil War, Mongolia was controlled by Ariq Böke, a younger brother of Kublai Khan. After Kublai's victory over Ariq Böke, the Yuan dynasty was founded in China in 1271, and both North China and Mongolia were put within the Central Region (腹裏) directly governed by the Zhongshu Sheng of the Yuan at the capital Khanbaliq (Dadu). Even though Karakorum was no longer the empire's capital and Mongolia had partially lost its importance by now, as homeland of the Mongols, it still had a strong influence both politically and militarily over other parts of the empire. There were many Mongolian princes concentrated in the Mongolian steppe, whose influence extended into the Yuan capital. In fact, in order to maintain his claim as the Great Khan, Kublai Khan made significant efforts to control and restore peace in Mongolia after the Toluid Civil War. In 1266, Nomukhan, one of Kublai's favorite sons, was dispatched to Mongolia to guard the north.

During the Kaidu–Kublai war which lasted a few decades, Kaidu, the de facto ruler of the Chagatai Khanate, tried to take control of Mongolia from Kublai Khan. In fact he shortly occupied large parts of Mongolia, although it was later recovered by the Yuan commander Bayan of the Baarin. Temür was later appointed a governor in Karakorum and Bayan became a minister. During Nayan's rebellion against Kublai Khan in Manchuria in the late 1280s, Nayan tried to contact Mongolian princes located in the Mongolian homeland, although most of them did not agree to support him after a settlement made by Kublai Khan. After all, the Yuan court needed the allegiance of the Mongol aristocracy as a whole even when it was forced to strike against individual members. After the death of the Crown Prince Zhenjin in 1286, Kublai Khan decided to make Zhenjin's son Temur his successor. After Kublai Khan's death in 1294, Temür, who previously garrisoned in Mongolia, returned to the Yuan capital to become the next ruler of the empire. During his rule, Külüg, who would become the third Yuan emperor after Temür's death, was sent to Mongolia to assume command of an army that defended the western front of the Yuan against Kaidu and other princes of Central Asia under him. In 1307, when Temür Khan died, he returned eastward to Karakorum and watched the situation. He eventually succeeded to the throne with the support of his mother and younger brother, Ayurbarwada. Shortly after the enthronement of Külüg Khan, Mongolia was put under the Karakorum Branch Secretariat (和林等處行中書省) or simply the Karakorum province (和林行省), although parts of Inner Mongolia were still governed by the Zhongshu Sheng. It was renamed to the Lingbei Branch Secretariat (嶺北等處行中書省) or simply the Lingbei province (嶺北行省, lit. "north of the mountains province") by his successor Ayurbarwada in 1312.

The establishment of the province in Mongolia decreased the importance of the princes in the steppe region, but it did not prevent the seizure of the throne by Yesün Temür in 1323 as a "steppe candidate" in close collaboration with the conspirators in Gegeen Khan's court. During the civil war of the Yuan dynasty known as the War of the Two Capitals after the death of Yesün Temür, the Lingbei province supported the loyalists at Shangdu and fought against El Temür and Jayaatu Khan Tugh Temür, but they were eventually crushed by the forces of the latter. After the civil war Tugh Temür abdicated in favor of his older brother Kusala, who enthroned himself on February 27, 1329, north of Karakorum. However, he suddenly died only four days after a banquet with Tugh Temür on his way to Khanbaliq (Dadu). Tugh Temür was restored to the throne on September 8. After the capture of the Yuan capital by the Ming dynasty founded by Han Chinese in 1368, the last Yuan emperor Toghon Temür fled north to Shangdu, then to Yingchang and died there in 1370. The Mongols under his son and successor Biligtü Khan Ayushiridara retreated to the Mongolian steppe and fought against the Ming. The Mongolian homeland became the ruling center of the Northern Yuan dynasty, which would last until the 17th century.

== See also ==
- Toluid Civil War
- Mongolia under Qing rule
- Manchuria under Yuan rule
- Korea under Yuan rule
- Tibet under Yuan rule
- Yuan dynasty in Inner Asia
- History of Mongolia
