= War of the Two Capitals =

Military conflict

Date	1328–1332
Location	Yuan China (Mongolia, Manchuria, North China)
Result	Khanbaliq group (restorationists) victory

Belligerents
Khanbaliq group (Restorationists)	Shangdu group (Loyalists)

Commanders and leaders
Jayaatu Khan Tugh Temür; El Temür	Ragibagh Khan; Dawlat Shah

The War of the Two Capitals (simplified Chinese: 两都之战; traditional Chinese: 兩都之戰), or the Tianli Incident (simplified Chinese: 天历之变; traditional Chinese: 天歷之變), was a war of succession that occurred in 1328 in the Yuan dynasty and fought between the forces based in the Yuan capital Khanbaliq (Dadu, modern Beijing) and the forces based in the summer capital Shangdu after the death of Yuan emperor Yesün Temür in Shangdu. The clash between the two groups was the bloodiest and most destructive succession in all of Yuan history. The War of the Two Capitals was less about ideology and more a struggle to advance individual family interests through political alliances and military strength. It ended with victory for the Khanbaliq group, but it took a few years for the last remnants of its opponents to give up.

== Background ==
In 1323, when Shidebala Gegeen Khan (Emperor Yingzong) was assassinated by Grand Censor Tegshi and Esen Temur, the rebellious group welcomed Yesün Temür as the new ruler. The death of Yesün Temür Khan in Shangdu five years later in August 1328 gave the line of Khayishan Külüg Khan (Emperor Wuzong) an opportunity to surface. The designated heir, Yesün Temü's son Ragibagh, was installed by the powerful Muslim officer and Yesün Temür's favorite retainer Dawlat Shah at the summer palace in Shangdu in the next month. At the main capital in Khanbaliq (Dadu, modern Beijing), however, bold action was taken to restore the throne to the sons of Khayishan, either Kusala (the father of the last Yuan ruler Toghon Temür) or Tugh Temür (who was cooling his heels in South China). But it was mainly due to the political ingenuity of El Temür, whose Qipchaq family reached its zenith under Khayishan. He activated a conspiracy in the capital Khanbaliq to overthrow the court at Shangdu. He and his entourages enjoyed enormous geographical and economic advantages over the loyalists of Yesün Temür. Tugh Temür was recalled to Khanbaliq by El Temür since his more influential brother Kuśala stayed in far-away Central Asia at the time. He was installed as the new ruler in Khanbaliq in September at about the same time Ragibagh succeeded to the throne in Shangdu. Not everyone who participated in the movement had ties as close as El Temür's to Khayishan's family. The restorationists under El Temür had the extensive human and material resources of the Central Region (under Zhongshu Sheng), Hunan, Jiangzhe, Jiangxi and Huguang provinces whereas the loyalists at Shangdu had the support of only Lingbei, Liaoyang, Shaanxi, Sichuan and Yunnan, all of which were geographically peripheral. Also, Mongolian princes and high-ranking Mongolian officials based in Manchuria (Liaodong) and eastern Mongolia fought on both sides of this civil war.

== War ==
At the start of the war, Ragibagh's forces broke through the Great Wall at several points, and penetrated as far as the outskirts of Khanbaliq. El Temür, however, was able to turn the tide quickly in his favor. The restorationists from Manchuria and eastern Mongolia launched a surprise attack on the loyalists. Their army under the command of Bukha Temur and Orlug Temur, descendants of Genghis Khan's brothers, surrounded Shangdu on 14 November, at a time most of the loyalists were involved on the Great Wall front. The loyalists in Shangdu surrendered on the very next day, and Dawlat Shah and most of the leading loyalists were taken prisoner and later executed. Ragibagh was reported to be missing. With the surrender of Shangdu, the way to restoring Khayishan's imperial line was cleared.

However, the loyalists elsewhere carried on fighting for much longer. Indeed, the loyalists in Shanxi did not lay down their arms until December 1328, and their counterparts in Sichuan surrendered only in the following month. Early in the next year there was a revolt in Yunnan, where the Prince Tugel declared himself independent. Troops were sent against him, and were ordered to march by the country of Pa fan. With the support of the province's aboriginal tribes, such as the Lolos and other tribes of Miaotze on the borders of Yunnan, Tugel successfully resisted the imperial army. The Yuan army under the command of Temur Buka was defeated, and sent for reinforcements. At that point the Prince Yuntu Temur was ordered to withdraw 20,000 men from the provinces of Jiangzhe, Jiangxi and Henan Jiangbei, and to lead them by way of Huguang towards Yunnan. The last remnants of the loyalists did not give up their cause until 1332.
