= Five Pagoda Temple =

Wikimedia disambiguation page

The name Five Pagoda/Stupa Temple (Chinese: 五塔寺; pinyin: Wǔ Tǎ Sì) refers to several temples in China. They were constructed in the late 15th century following the architectural design of a Diamond Throne Pagoda inspired by the Indian Mahabodhi Temple. Temples built according to this design are:

- Zhenjue Temple in Beijing, the oldest temple of this style in China
- Five Pagoda Temple in Hohhot, Inner Mongolia
- Miaozhan Temple (Chinese: 妙湛寺; pinyin: Miàozhàn Sì) in Kunming, Yunnan Province
- Guanghui Temple in Zhengding, Hebei Province
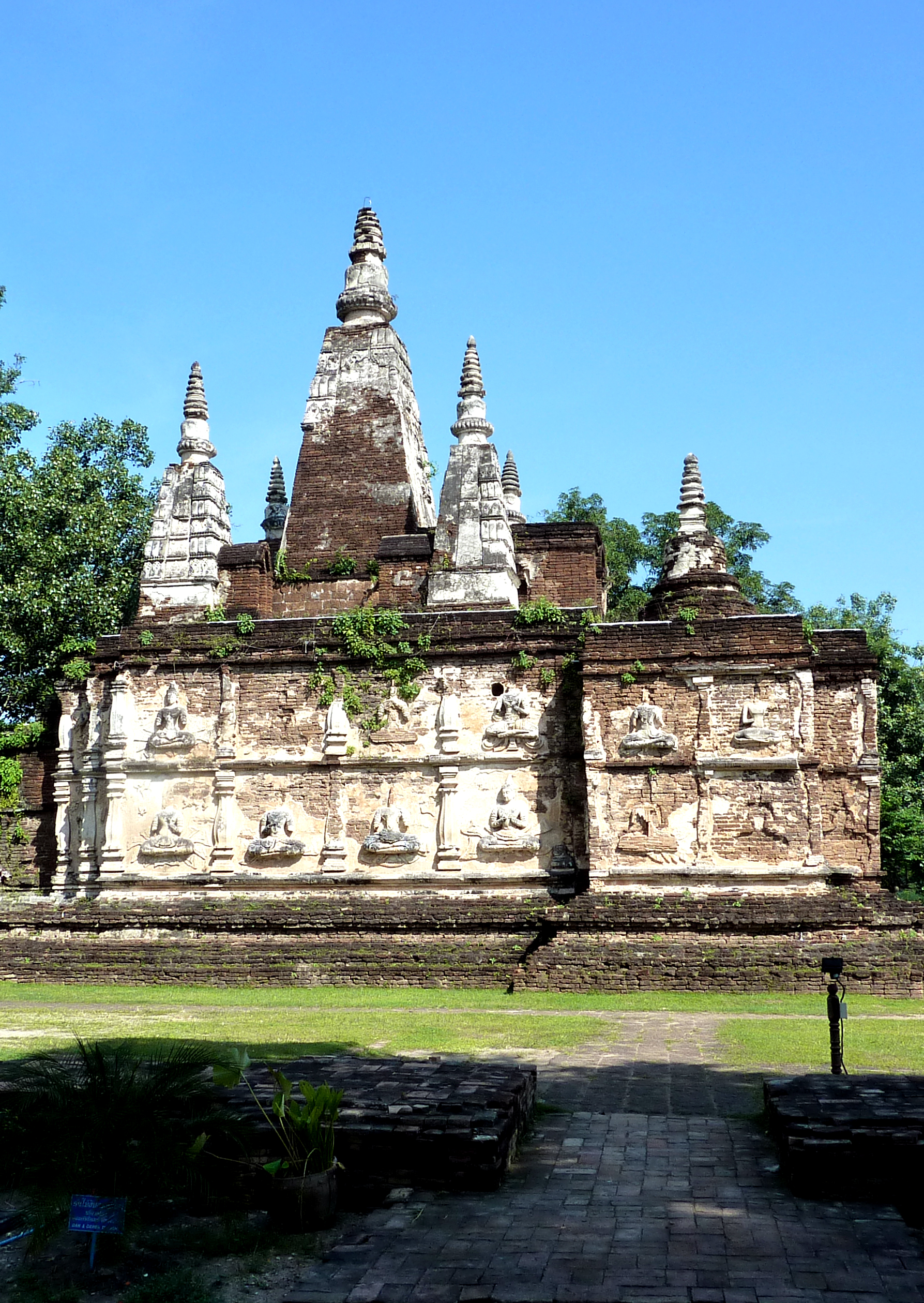
A diamond throne pagoda in Thailand

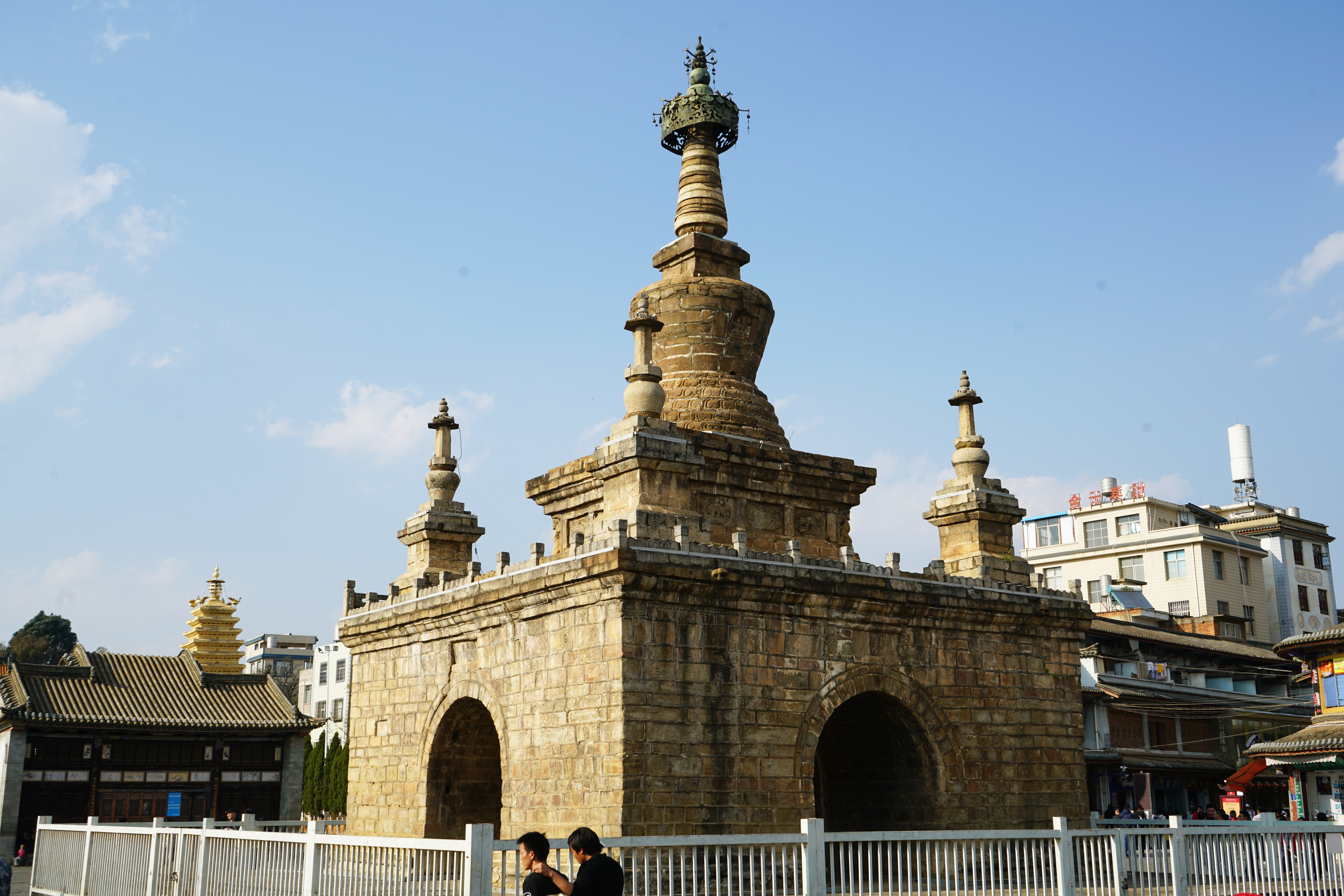
A diamond throne stupa in China

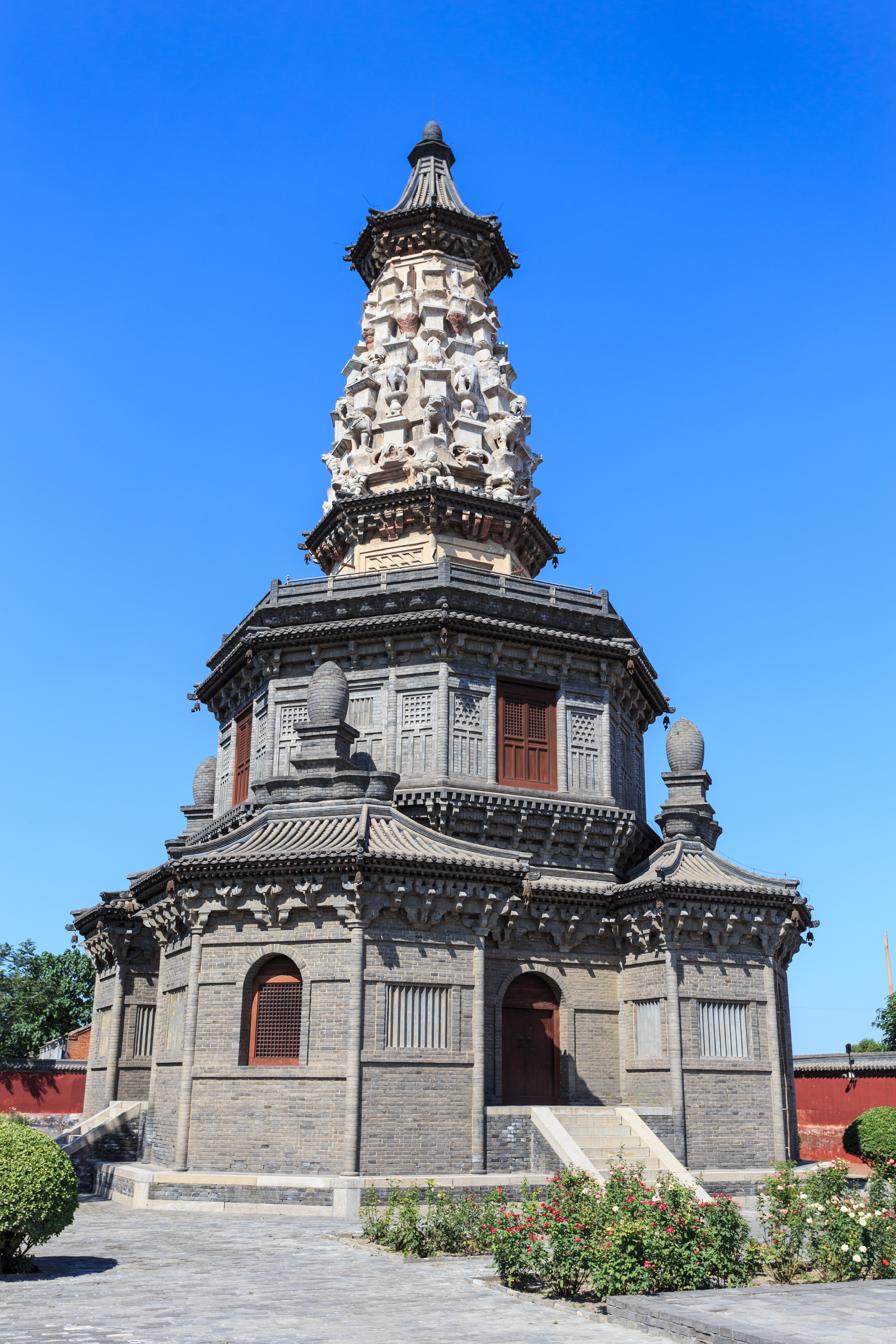
A diamond throne pagoda in China

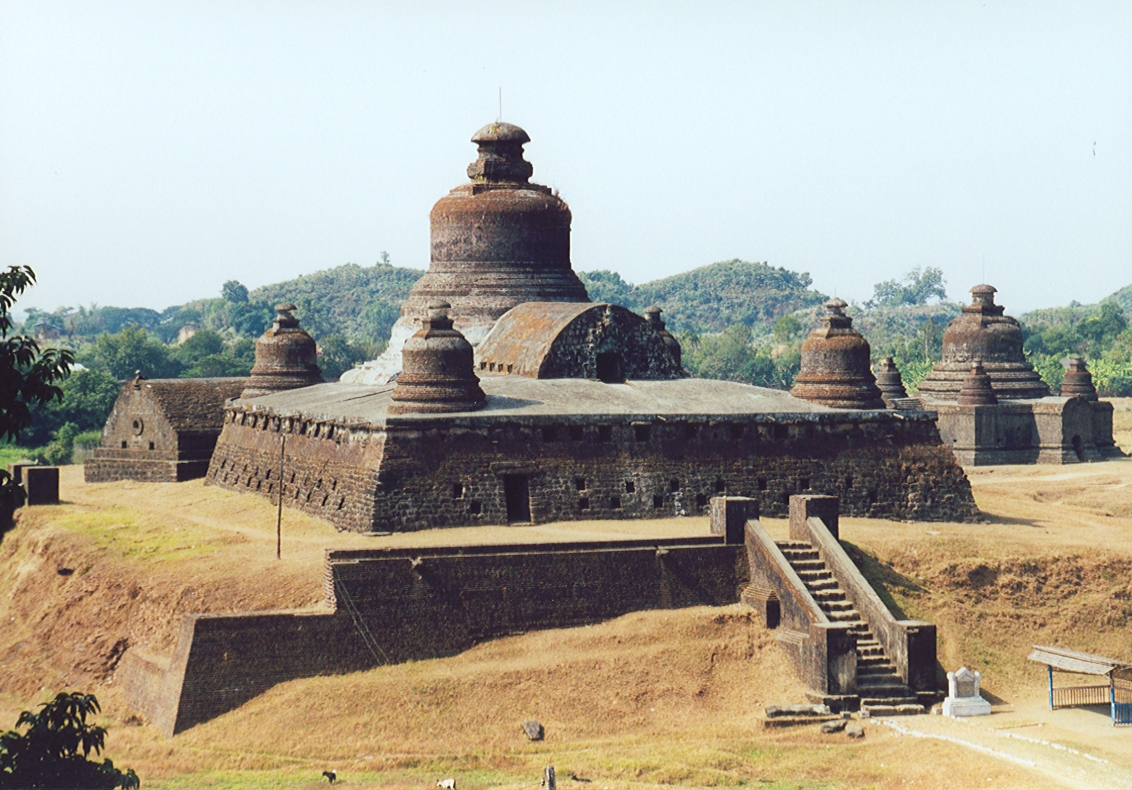
A diamond throne stupa in Myanmar
