= Vanaratna =

Indian Buddhist monk and scholar

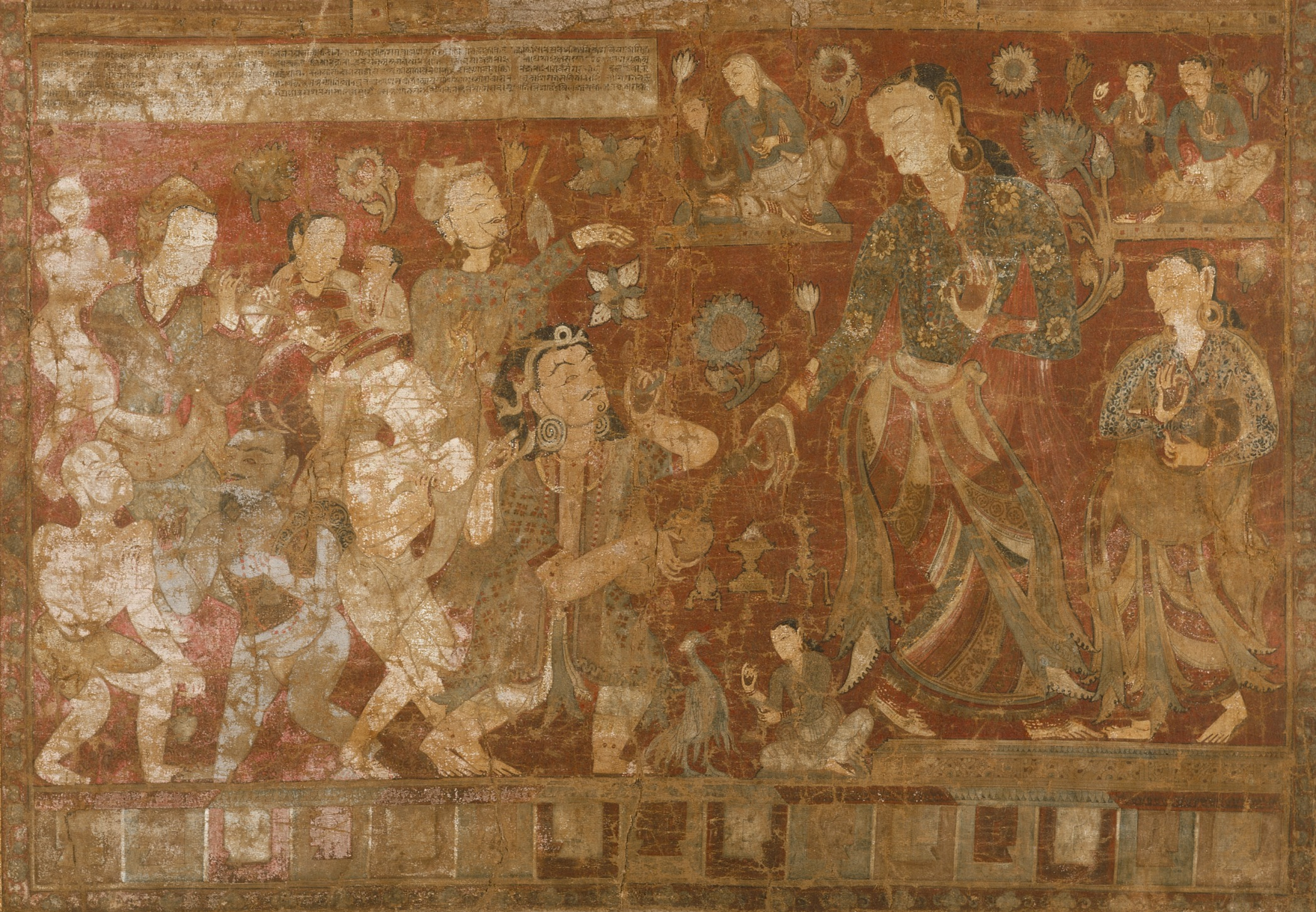
- Nepalese depiction of Vanaratna receiving initiation from White Tara

Personal life
- Born: c. 1384 CE Sadnagara
- Died: c. 1468 CE

Religious life
- Religion: Buddhism

Vanaratna (c. 1384-1468 CE), was an Indian Buddhist monk and scholar. Along with Dhyānabhadra (c. 1289–1363 C.E) and Śāriputra (c. 1335-1426 CE), he is one of the last recorded Indian Buddhists in the pre-modern era.

== Biography ==
The details of Vanaratna's life are recorded by his Tibetan biographers. Notably the mKhas pa chen po dpal nags kyi rin chen gyi rnam par thar pa (Life of the Great Paṇḍita, the Illustrious Vanaratna) which was written by Gö Lotsawa Zhönnu-pel. Vanaratna was born in 1384 CE into the ruling family of the city of Sadnagara. The exact location of Sadnagara is uncertain although Tibetan sources have identified it as being three months of travel east of Bodh Gaya so likely in the far-eastern regions of Bengal around the area of modern Chittagong. Vanaratna was orphaned at an early age with his father dying early and his mother being unfit to raise him due to alcoholism. Because of this, he was ordained as a monk at Mahācatiya Vihāra at the age of eight where he was educated in both the Mahayana and Vajrayana schools of Buddhism.

=== Travels ===
By the age of twenty in 1404 CE, he left Sadnagara to live as an itinerant monk and scholar with Sri Lanka being the first destination he set out for from the port of Chittagong. On his way to Sri Lanka, he stopped at the town of Kaveripattinam where he engaged with the local Buddhist community. He eventually arrived in the Kingdom of Gampola.

During his time in Sri Lanka, Vanaratna spent his time focusing on meditation and study. The island was said to have been filled with stupas at the time, which was the focus of reverence among the local population, and Vanaratna also visited many of these. Tibetan biographers also focus on his ascent of the holy mountain of Sri Pada. In total, he spent six years on the island before he departed back to India in 1411.

From 1411 onwards, he stayed in the region around the Krishna River valley in modern-day Andhra Pradesh where he stayed and taught with a small Buddhist community. His next location after this was to travel to Magadha around the sacred site of Bodh Gaya where he arrived in 1416 CE. In Bodh Gaya, Vanaratna was disappointed to discover that the Buddhist community was small with non-Buddhist Vaishnavites now forming the majority community there. Despite this, the local kings continued to support the remaining small Buddhist community around the Mahabodhi Temple. He also visited the nearby site of Nalanda which at this time was no longer functioning and had long since been abandoned. It was in Magadha that Vanaratna reached the decision to leave India and travel to Nepal and Tibet, likely due to the lack of a thriving Buddhist community.

Vanaratna left India finally in 1422 and arrived in the Kathmandu Valley in 1423 CE. It was here that he discovered the large Buddhist community that he had long been seeking. In 1427, he left Nepal and travelled to Tibet where again he joined with the local Buddhist community. It was at this point that Vanaratna embarked on his literary career where gained great renown. He spent his time between Nepal and Tibet until his death in 1468 CE.

== Vanaratna codex ==
The so-called "Vanaratna codex" is a multiple text palm-leaf manuscript closely associated with the life and works of Vanaratna and was said to have been "prepared under his close supervision". These assorted texts are mainly esoteric in nature and were written in the Sanskrit language. Some of the texts contained in the manuscript seem to be translations made by Vanaratna of Tibetan texts that were transmitted orally. The Indologist Harunaga Isaacson estimates that the codex was compiled at some point between 1426 CE and 1468 CE.

The manuscript was originally found in Nepal and is now kept by the Royal Asiatic Society of Great Britain and Ireland in London.

== Sources ==
- Damron, Ryan (2021). A Gift of the Dharma: The Life and Works of Vanaratna (1384-1468) (PhD theses) (Thesis). University of California, Berkeley.
