= Zhenjue Temple =

Buddhist temple in Beijing, China

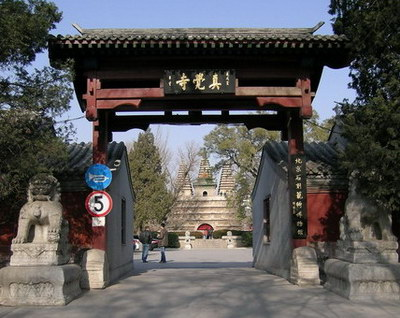
- Main temple gate with Diamond Throne Tower in the background

- Location in Beijing

Religion
- Affiliation: Buddhism

Location
- Country: China
- Coordinates: 39.944916°N 116.33035°E

The Five Pagoda Temple (Chinese: 五塔寺; pinyin: Wǔ Tǎ Sì), formally known as the "Temple of the Great Righteous Awakening" (traditional Chinese: 大真覺寺; simplified Chinese: 大真觉寺; pinyin: Dà Zhēnjué Sì) or "Zhenjue Temple" (Chinese: 真觉寺; Chinese: 真覺寺; pinyin: Zhēnjué Sì) for short, is a Ming dynasty Buddhist temple located in Haidian District, Beijing, China.

== Architecture ==
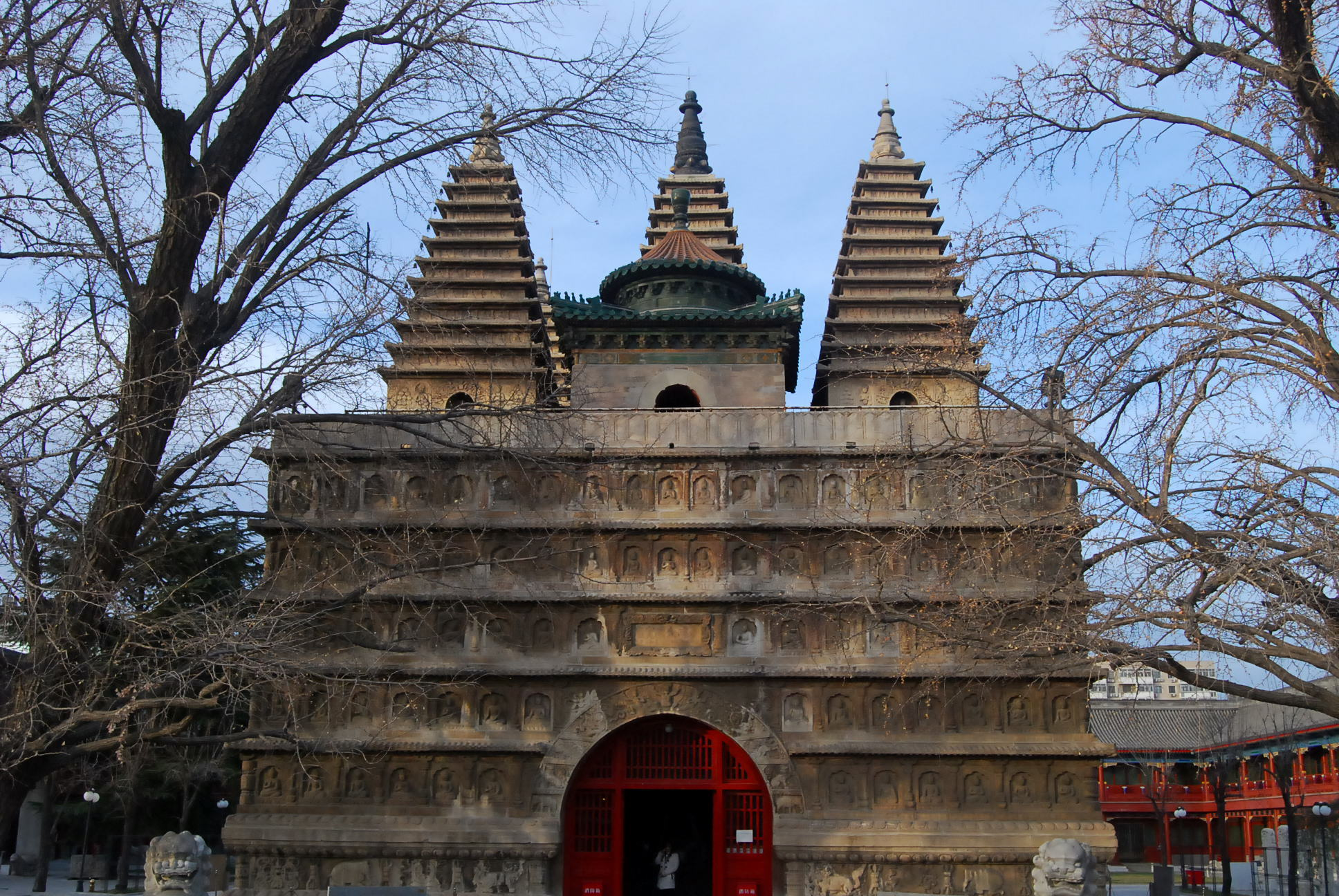
Diamond Throne Stupa in Zhenjue Temple

The temple has a square foundation, the "diamond throne", that stands 7.7 metres (25 ft) tall. The foundation can be accessed through a spiral staircase and supports five pagodas and a glazed pavilion. Each of the pagodas has a rectangular floor plan. Four of the pagodas are positioned on the corners of the foundation (one pagoda on each corner), the fifth pagoda stands in the center. The five pagodas are associated with the Five Dhyani Buddhas. The corner pagodas have 11 layers of eaves, whereas the slightly taller central pagoda has 13 layers. The total height of the structure from its base to the tip of the central pagoda is 17 metres (56 ft). The building is constructed from brick and white marble, but the building has taken a rusty color due to the oxidation of iron traces in the stone. All four walls of the foundations are decorated with carving of the one thousand sagacious Buddhas arranged in rows as well as Buddhist symbols (such as dharma wheels), animals (elephants and peacocks) and floral designs (bodhi trees), as well as Sūtra texts.

Among the decorations is a pair of footprints that symbolizes the spread of Buddhism all over the world. Traces of red pigments remain from the previous painting of the pedestal. Its Diamond Throne Tower's architectural style is that of a "diamond (Vajra) throne pagoda", which is inspired by the Mahabodhi Temple in Bodh Gaya, Bihar, India that marks the place where Buddha is said to have attained enlightenment (bodhi). However, the design of the Diamond Throne Pagoda in the Zhenjue Temple differs from that of the Mahabodhi Temple in the proportions of the structure: The pedestal of the Mahabodhi Temple is much lower compared to the overall height than the pedestal in the Zhenjue Temple. Furthermore, the central pagoda in the Mahabodhi Temple is much taller than the corner pagodas, whereas in the Zhenjue Temple, the central pagoda is only slightly higher than the other pagodas. Besides the proportions, the two buildings also differ in the decorations, which have a distinct Chinese style in case of the Zhenjue Temple, e.g., they had glazed-tile roofs.

== History ==
It is not clear how the architectural style of the "Diamond Throne Pagoda" of the Mahabodhi Temple was introduced to China. According to one tradition. the design was presented to the imperial court by the high-ranking Indian monk named Sariputra during the reign of the Yongle Emperor in the early 15th century. Besides the designs for the diamond throne pagoda, the monk is said to have brought with him five golden Buddha statues. According to the legend, these statues are buried in the temple, one under each pagoda. However, references to such design can be found in much older Chinese art and architecture, for example in a mural painting in the Dunhuang Grottoes that has been dated to the Northern dynasties, about 1000 years older than the Zhenjue Temple.

Using the style of the diamond throne pagoda, the temple was constructed later during the reign of the Chenghua Emperor in 1473. Besides the marble construction of the diamond throne pagoda, the temple complex also contained a number of wooden buildings; at least six halls were present during the times of the Ming dynasty. The complex underwent renovation during the time of the Qing dynasty in 1761 when the halls were tiled in yellow. The temple complex was damaged by fire in 1860, during the Second Opium War and again in 1900 by the Eight-Nation Alliance that put down the Boxer Rebellion. Only the stone structure of the five pagoda building proper survived the destruction, the wooden halls perished, but the pedestal that once supported the "Big Treasure Hall" remains on the site. At present, the temple houses the Beijing Art Museum of Stone Carvings (Chinese: 北京石刻艺术博物馆; pinyin: Běijīng Shíkè Yìshù Bówùguǎn). The Zhenjue Temple has been listed as a national monument since 1961 (resolution 1-75).

== See also ==
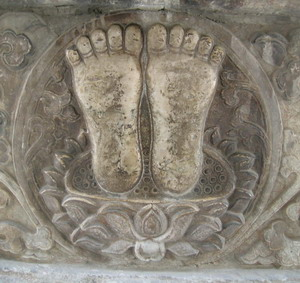
"Buddha's feet" ornament

There are at least six temples containing a "diamond throne pagoda" in China. The other five temples are:

- Temple of the Azure Clouds in Beijing
- Yellow Temple in Beijing
- Five Pagoda Temple in Hohhot, Inner Mongolia
- Miaozhan Temple (Chinese: 妙湛寺; pinyin: Miàozhàn Sì) in Kunming, Yunnan Province
- Guanghui Temple (Chinese: 广惠寺; pinyin: Guǎnghuì Sì) in Zhengding, Hebei Province

The Beijing Zhenjue Temple is the oldest of these buildings.
