= Qingcheng Park =

Park in Hohhot, Inner Mongolia, China

- People's Park
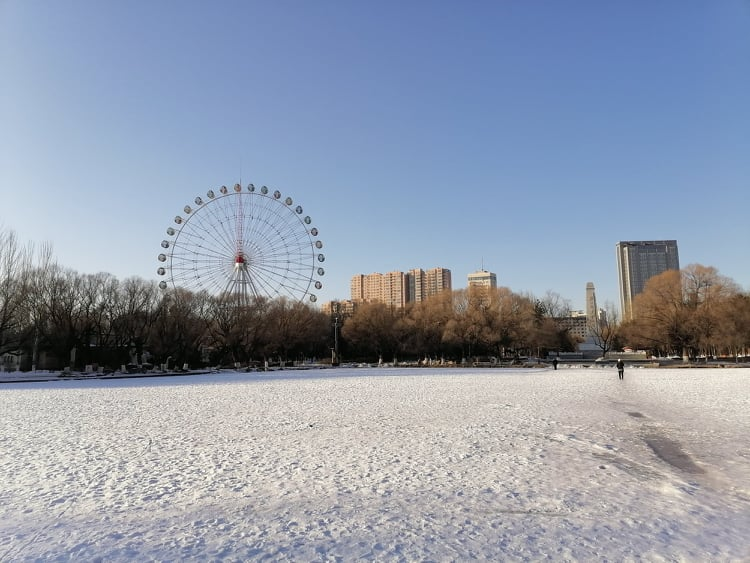
- Qingcheng Park in winter
- Interactive map of Qingcheng Park
- Type: Urban park
- Location: Hohhot, Inner Mongolia, China
- Coordinates: 40.80630°N 111.65978°E
- Area: 48 ha (120 acres)
- Created: July 1931

Qingcheng Park (Chinese: 青城公园; pinyin: Qīngchéng Gōngyuán), formerly People's Park (Chinese: 人民公园; pinyin: Rénmín Gōngyuán), is an urban public park in central Hohhot, the capital of Inner Mongolia Autonomous Region in North China. It is bounded by West Zhongshan Road and Tiyuchang Road, and covers an area of 48 hectares (120 acres). It is one of the major tourist sites in Hohhot.

== History ==
The park was established in July 1931 as Dragon Spring Park (Longquan Park) on Reclining Dragon Hill (Wolong Gang), a sacred site connected with some shrines. In 1950, the new People's Republic of China government renewed the area and renamed it People's Park. The park's name was changed again in June 1997 to Qingcheng Park.

== See also ==
- Five Pagoda Temple (Hohhot) near the park
