= Śāriputra (15th-century) =

Indian Buddhist monk and abbot of Bodh Gaya

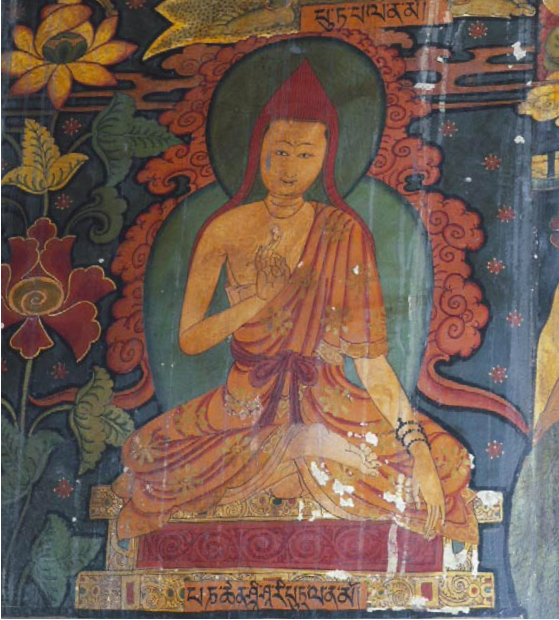
- 15th century mural of Śāriputra from Palcho Monastery in Southern Tibet. The inscription at the bottom translates to "Veneration to Shri Śāriputra".

Personal life
- Born: c. 1335 CE Piribīnagara
- Died: c. 1426 CE Beijing, Ming China
- Education: Mahābodhi Mahāvihāra

Religious life
- Religion: Buddhism
- School: Mahayana

Śāriputra (c. 1335-1426 CE), also known in Chinese sources as Shilisha 室利沙, was a 15th-century Indian Buddhist monk and scholar, and the last known abbot of the Bodh Gaya mahavihara in Bihar, India before its restoration in the 19th century. After he left Bodh Gaya, Sariputra subsequently travelled to Nepal, Tibet and China.

Among his activities are the restoration of the Swayambhunath caitya in Kathmandu. Following this, he spent some time in Tibet where he helped to establish tantric lineages that had originated in India. What we know of Sariputra's life is recorded in his Tibetan and Chinese biographies. Along with Dhyānabhadra (1289–1363 CE), Vanaratna (1384-1468 CE) and Buddhaguptanātha (1514-1610 CE), Śāriputra is among the last recorded Indian Buddhist figures of the pre-modern era.

== Biography ==
=== Early life ===
Sariputra seems to have been born in a Buddhist family somewhere in Eastern India in a town called Piribīnagara which has yet to be identified. Arthur McKeown has suggested that from the descriptions of the city and its fortifications, it could be Simraungadh in the Mithila region on the border of Bihar and Nepal.

At a young age, he made the decision to travel westwards to Bodh Gaya where he studied under two teachers, Gunaratna and Mahasvami and took the precepts of a monk. From an assessment of the books he mentions as having studied, it is clear that Śāriputra was trained in the Mahayana school of Buddhism. After the death of Buddhasvami, the chief preceptor of Bodh Gaya, Sairputra was asked to replace him as the abbot of the Bodh Gaya monastery. Sariputra was responsible for the restoration of various buildings and monuments around the site of the Mahabodhi Temple. During this period, many Burmese pilgrims visited Bodh Gaya who also helped to fund the restoration of these religious sites. Prior to this, the upper half of the Mahabodhi's gandola had been destroyed by Turushkas (Note: Turushka is a word for "Muslim Turkish Mercenaries". Bosworth, Clifford Edmund (1980). The Islamic dynasties : a chronological and genealogical handbook. Internet Archive. Edinburgh : Edinburgh University Press. pp. 2, 197. ISBN 978-0-85224-402-9.). He also received royal patronage from a local King, after preaching Buddhism to him and took part in debates with non-Buddhists from other parts of India. After many years serving as the abbot of Bodh Gaya, Sariputra decided to travel northwards to Nepal.

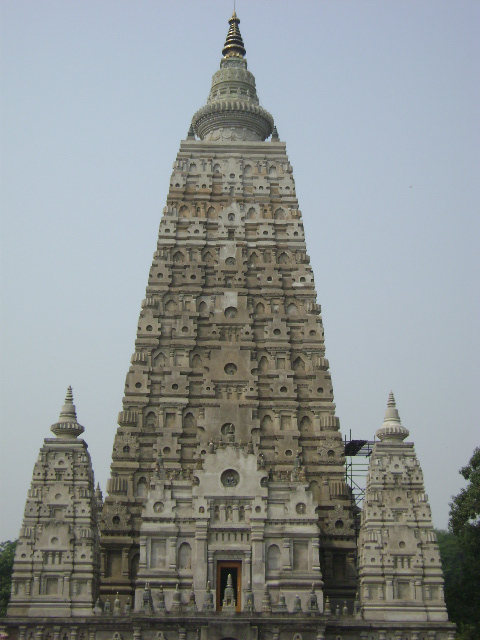
The Mahabodhi Temple of Bodh Gaya, Bihar, India

=== Nepal ===
When Sariputra travelled to Nepal, he noted that the Buddhist site of Swayambhunath caitya which he worshipped at was in bad condition. He suggested to the local King who belonged to the Malla dynasty that it should be restored and these restorations were likely completed by 1412 CE. It has been suggested that during this period he lived in Bhaktapur although there is very little other information regarding his activities in Nepal.

=== Tibet ===
Sariputra was said to have visited Tibet around 1418 when Bdag Chen ruled. From Sariputra, this ruler was said to have received initiations into various tantric lineages including Kalachakra tantra and he was listed as one of the king's main spiritual advisors. Tibetan sources also detail that he consecrated a bridge in Lcang ra in 1418. His "lineage biography" states that he spent a year at the monastery of Samye where he devoted himself to rituals relating to the bodhisattva Manjushri. The source then adds that he eventually received a vision of Manjushri.

After leaving Samye, he travelled to Upper Myang in Gtsang where he met Sha ra'i dpon chen Kun dga phags who offered him a substantial amount of gold to stay in the region. Sariputra agreed to stay for a year and engage in the transmission of vinaya texts with local scholars including the abbot of Palcho Monastery. After his stay at Gtsang, Sariputra received an imperial invitation to Lhasa which was to be his final destination in Tibet before travelling to China. Here he visited the Jowo Shakyamuni statue which he circumambulates one hundred times. The lineage biography also implies that Sariputra may have designed a replica of the Mahabodhi Temple during his stay in Lhasa.

=== China ===
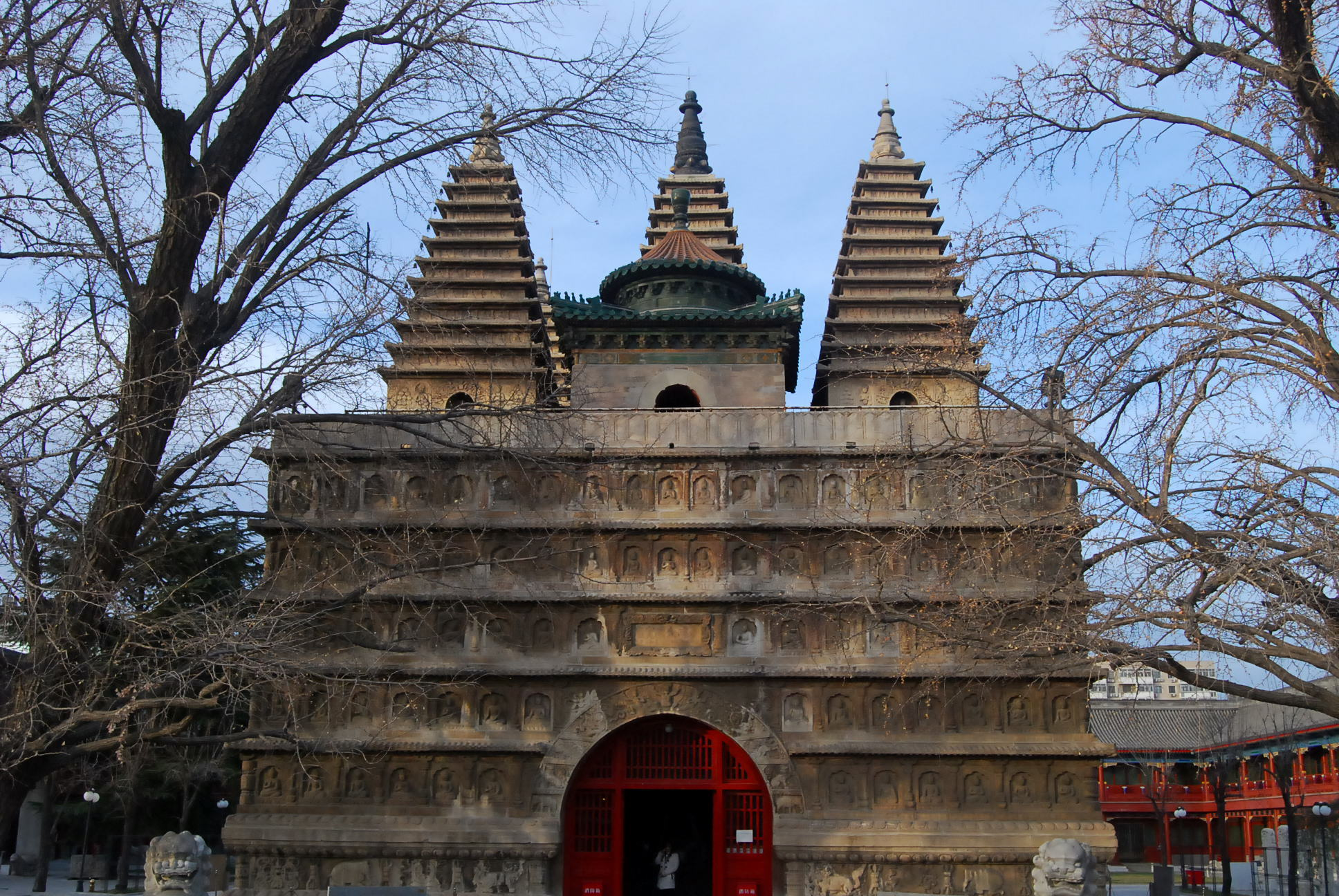
Zhenjue Temple in Beijing for which Sariputra provided the design

Following his stay in Tibet, Sariputra was subsequently invited to China, where he arrived with Hou Xian, who was sent to Tibet to collect him on behalf of the Ming dynasty. Sariputra arrived in Beijing, where he met the Yongle Emperor. The exact date of when he met with the Yongle Emperor is not known for certain, but most estimates place it around the early 15th century. During this time, Sariputra was provided with residence at the Haiyin monastery. Sariputra was also present during the ascension of the Hongxi Emperor where he performed the ritual of enthronement in 1425 and was thus given the title "Perfectly enlightened, great imperial preceptor".

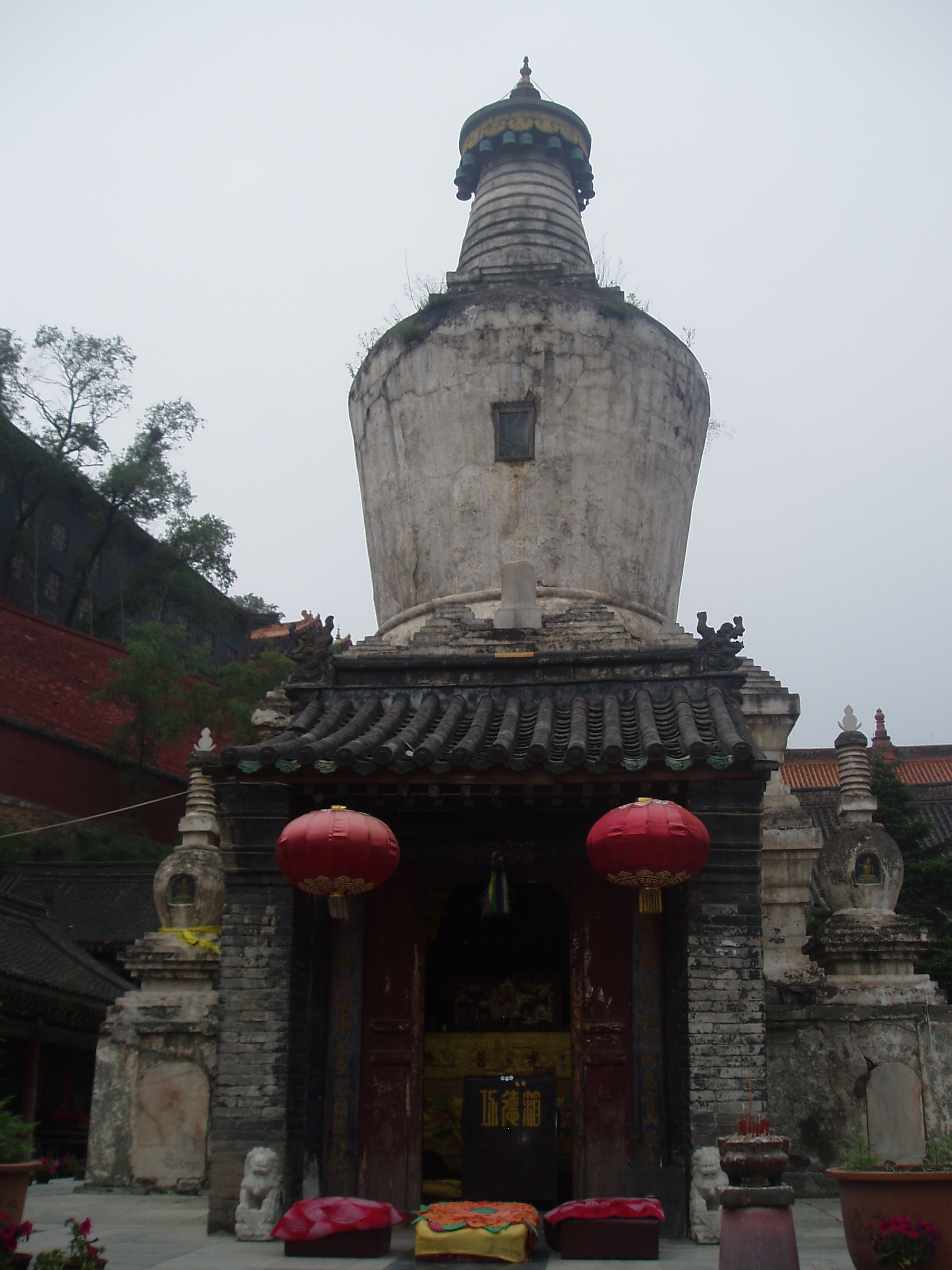
Sariputra’s stupa, built in 1434, at Yuanzhao Temple

As per his biography, Sariputra seems to have spent most of his time in China in Beijing. He was responsible for providing the design of the Zhenjue Temple which itself is a replica of the Mahabodhi temple. He is also said to have brought with him five Golden Buddha statues which as per legend are buried under the temple under each pagoda.

Sariputra died on February 20, 1426 CE and on his deathbed, hagiographic sources state that he said to his students:

"From India, I came here to teach. Now, my contribution is finished; I am about to die. Each of you must mind the great dharma of the Tathagatas. Don't be even a little lax!"

The Emperor ordered his funeral ceremony and cremation and his ashes and relics were collected in the town of Xiangshan. A stupa was also built in his memory in Yuanzhao Temple.
