= Yesün Temür (Yuan dynasty) =

Mongol Khan and Emperor of Yuan dynasty from 1323 to 1328

Taiding Emperor of Yuan 元泰定帝 ᠶᠢᠰᠦᠨᠲᠡᠮᠦᠷ ᠬᠠᠭᠠᠨ
- 10th Khagan of the Mongol Empire (Nominal due to the empire's division); Emperor of China (6th Emperor of the Yuan dynasty)
- Yesün Temür in 14th century painting

Emperor of the Yuan dynasty
- Reign: October 4, 1323 – August 15, 1328
- Coronation: October 4, 1323
- Predecessor: Gegeen Khan Shidebala
- Successor: Ragibagh Khan
- Born: 1293
- Died: August 15, 1328 (aged 34); Shangdu, Yuan dynasty
- Empress: Empress Babukhan of Khongirad clan (m.?–1328)
Names
- Mongolian: ᠶᠢᠰᠦᠨ ᠲᠡᠮᠦᠷ; Chinese: 也孫鐵木兒; Yesün Temür Khan
Era dates
- Taiding (泰定) 1324–1328; Zhihe (致和) 1328
Posthumous name
- None
Temple name
- None
- House: Borjigin
- Dynasty: Yuan
- Father: Gammala
- Mother: Buyan Kelmish of the Khongirad

Yesün Temür (Mongolian: Есөн Төмөр ᠶᠢᠰᠦᠨ ᠲᠡᠮᠦᠷ; Chinese: 也孫鐵木兒, 1293 – August 15, 1328) was a great-grandson of Kublai Khan and an emperor of the Yuan dynasty from 1323 to 1328. Apart from being Emperor of China, he is regarded as the 10th Khagan of the Mongol Empire, although it was only nominal due to the division of the empire. In Chinese historiography, Yesün Temür, who was very fond of the traditional ways of the Mongols, is commonly known as the Taiding Emperor of Yuan (Chinese: 元泰定帝) based on his first era name. His name means "nine iron" in the Mongolian language.

He was probably the emperor visited by the Franciscan friar Odoric, who left an excellent record of his travels.

== Early life ==
Yesün Temür was born in Mongolia in 1293 to Gammala, the eldest son of Zhenjin, who was presumed heir to his father Kublai Khan. Gammala was appointed as Jinong (jinwang, 晉王) in 1292 after Zhenjin's death, but he lost the race for successor to his younger brother Temür. Khanship was assumed by Temür, Darmabala, and their sons and grandson, so Gammala and his son Yesün Temür were out of the race. As Jinong, Gammala ruled the Mongolian steppe north of the Gobi Desert and enshrined Genghis Khan in the Four Great Ordo. In 1302 Gammala died and Yesün Temür took over as Jinong.

During the reigns of Kulug Khan, Ayurbarwada, and Gegeen Khan, Yesün Temür, who had a large fief and powerful army in the Mongolian steppe, became one of the princes most respected by the court and emerged as the undisputed leader of the princes in the steppe.

== Reign ==
=== Accession ===
Restored paintings by modern artists. Contemporary portraits do not exist or have been destroyed

In 1323 when Shidebala Gegeen Khan (Emperor Yingzong) was assassinated by Grand Censor Tegshi and Esen Temur, the rebellious group welcomed Yesün Temür since his mother was Buyan Kelmish of the Khunggirad clan. According to the official history of the Yuan, Yesün Temür caused Tegshi's envoy Walus to be seized and sent notice of the plot to Shidibala Khan, but the messengers arrived too late.

Yesün Temür was not merely the principal beneficiary of the conspiracy but was also very likely a participant. It is said that his administrator Dawlat Shah had established close contact with the conspirators. After receiving the imperial seal sent by the conspirators, he ascended to the throne on the bank of the Kherlen River in Mongolia on October 4, 1323. Esen Temur was made the grand councilor of the right, and Tegshi the manager of the Bureau of Military Affairs. Upon learning that he would incur suspicion as a party to the murders, he suddenly reversed his policy and ordered Tegshi, Esen Temur, and others to be put to death. Under the leadership of Chang Kuei, the late Khagan's officials sent a letter to Yesün Temür urging him to accept the throne and to punish the conspirators. He sent troops to Dadu and Shangdu and had rebellious officers executed before he entered Dadu because he feared becoming their puppet. The five princes who had been involved were exiled to Yunnan, Hainan, and other distant places.

Chinese officials repeatedly urged Yesün Temür to extend the purge to all former allies of Temuder and Tegshi and their families, but Yesün Temür Khan refused. He issued an amnesty decree, and the confiscated properties of the executed conspirators were returned to their families.

=== Administration and policies ===
"The Empire is a family of which the Emperor is the father."
Yesün Temür Khan, c. 1324, The History of the Yuan

As a ruler who had seized the throne by intrigue and violence, Yesün Temür tried to win the widest possible support. To secure support as Emperor of China from the Han populace, he duly showed his respect for the Confucian tradition from the beginning of his reign. Nevertheless, Muslim and Mongol officials from the steppe constituted the majority of posts in the Yuan government during this period. Kumeijil and Tas Temur served as grand councillars of the right; Dawlat Shah served as the manager of the governmental affairs of the Central Secretariat (中書省), then as censor in chief, and finally as grand councillary of the left; and Andachu, the manager of the Bureau of Military Affairs.

In addition to Dawlat Shah, there were two Muslims, Ubaidullah and Bayanchar, who served as managers of governmental affairs in the Secretariat. Mahmud Shah and Hasan Khoja managed the Bureau of Military Affairs. In contrast with the Muslims, Han officials exerted little influence on the administration. The high point of the Mongol partner-merchants' operations came under Yesün Temür, whose administration exempted Christians and Muslims from any corvee payments and guaranteed huge payments promised by the Mongolian nobility in return for luxury goods (тансаг).

Imperial edict (jarlig) of Yesün Temür, Year of the Dragon (1328 CE), written in Middle Mongolian in the ʼPhags-pa script.

Yesün Temür Khan denounced the extravagance of the court in buying costly precious stones, imported by foreign merchants, and sold for ten times their value, while the poor were starving. In 1326, Ozbeg Khan of the Golden Horde sent cheetahs to Yesün Temür Khan who responded with grants of gold, silver, cash, and silks.

During his reign Yesün Temür Khan divided the empire into eighteen departments controlled by a board called "the Lords of the Provinces"; it had formerly been divided into twelve units. Reports were presented on the condition of the Yuan provinces were full of complaints about the Lamas who, armed with their golden seals, rode about the province making exaction and treating the people in a shameful way. They put up at private houses, drove out their masters, debauched their wives, and did pretty much as they wished. The fear of offending the Mongols and the Lamas prevented the Khan from doing anything effectual at first. Finally, he forbade the Lamas from entering China. Besides Buddhism, Yesün Temür Khan neglected the ancient worship of the sky of the Mongols.

=== Later reign and death ===
Yesün Temür left the empire's governance to his Muslim aide Dawlat Shah and Khatun Babukhan when he suddenly died in Shangdu on August 15, 1328. His son Ragibagh was installed by Dawlat Shah, but he was defeated by his rival Tugh Temür three months later during the War of the Two Capitals.

== Family ==
Parents:

- Father: Gammala (甘麻剌;1263–8 February 1302), son of Zhenjin, posthumously awarded with the title of Emperor Renxiaoguangsheng (光圣仁孝皇帝)
- Mother: Buyan Kelmish (普顏怯里迷失王妃), posthumously awarded with the title of Empress Xuanyishusheng (宣懿淑圣皇后)

Consorts and their respective issue(s)

- Empress Babukhan (八不罕皇后), of the Hongjila clan (弘吉剌氏) from Khonggirat
  - Ragibagh Khan, Khagan (元天顺帝阿剌吉八), 1st son
- Empress Yilianzhenbala (亦怜真八剌皇后)
- Empress Sadabala, of the Khorchin Borjigin clan (撒答八剌皇后), niece of Yesün Temür
- Empress Bihan (必罕皇后), Hongjila clan (弘吉剌氏) from Khongirad
- Unknown:
  - Batma Irgenbü, Prince of Jin (晋王 八的麻亦兒間卜), 2nd son
  - Söse, Crown Prince (小薛 太子), 3rd son
  - Yüdan Zanbü, Crown Prince (允丹藏卜太子), 4th son

== See also ==
- List of emperors of the Yuan dynasty
- List of Mongol rulers
- List of rulers of China

Yesün Temür (Yuan dynasty) House of Borjigin Born: 1293 Died: 1328
Regnal titles
Preceded by Gegeen Khan, Emperor Yingzong	Great Khan of the Mongol Empire (Nominal due to the empire's division); 1323–1328	Succeeded by Ragibagh Khan, Emperor Tianshun
Preceded by Gegeen Khan, Emperor Yingzong	Emperor of the Yuan dynasty Emperor of China; 1323–1328	Succeeded by Ragibagh Khan, Emperor Tianshun
