= Temple of Azure Clouds =

Buddhist temple in Beijing, China

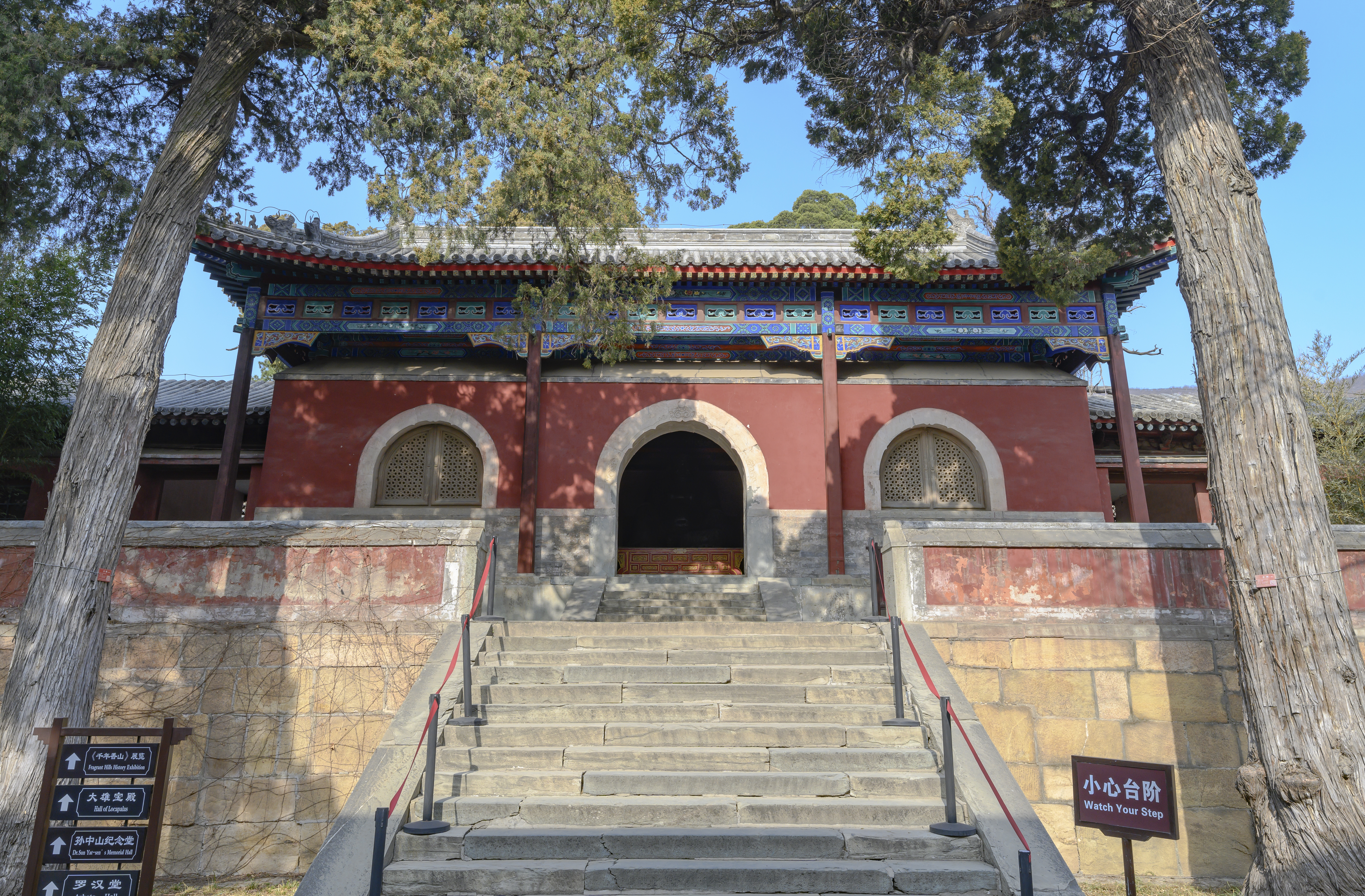
- Entrance to the Temple of Azure Clouds

- Location in Beijing

Religion
- Affiliation: Buddhism
- Year consecrated: 1331

Location
- Location: Haidian, Beijing, China
- Coordinates: 39°59′45″N 116°11′07″E

The Temple of Azure Clouds, Blue Cloud Temple, or Biyun Temple (Chinese: 碧云寺; pinyin: Bìyún Sì), is a Buddhist temple located in the eastern part of the Western Hills, just outside the north gate of Fragrant Hills (Xiangshan) Park, in Haidian District, Beijing, China, approximately 20 km from the city center.

The temple was first established in the 1331 during the Yuan dynasty, when a descendant of Yelü Chucai donated his residence to be made into a temple.

By the Ming dynasty, the temple had attracted the attention of two powerful eunuchs, Yu Jing and Wei Zhongxian, who each coveted its auspicious fengshui as a site for retirement and burial. Their successive expansions in 1514 and 1623 transformed the temple into one of the most magnificent monasteries in Beijing. The temple was further renovated and expanded in 1748 at the orders of the Qianlong Emperor in the Qing dynasty.

In 1925, the temple served as the lying-in-state site for Sun Yat-sen following his death in Beijing, and now houses the Sun Yat-sen Memorial Hall, with a crystal coffin presented by the Soviet government in 1925 in his memory.

Two other prominent features are the Arhats Hall and the Vajrasana Pagoda. There are 512 statues, which include 500 wooden Arhats, 11 Bodhisattvas and one statue of Ji Gong (a famous Buddhist monk) inside the Hall of Arhats. All the Arhats are vivid, life-size statues with different poses and expressions. It has been said that two of these Arhats were the statues of the Kangxi Emperor and the Qianlong Emperor of the Qing dynasty (1644–1911). In addition to these life-sized images, there is a miniature statue of Ji Gong perched on an overhead beam.

== Gallery ==
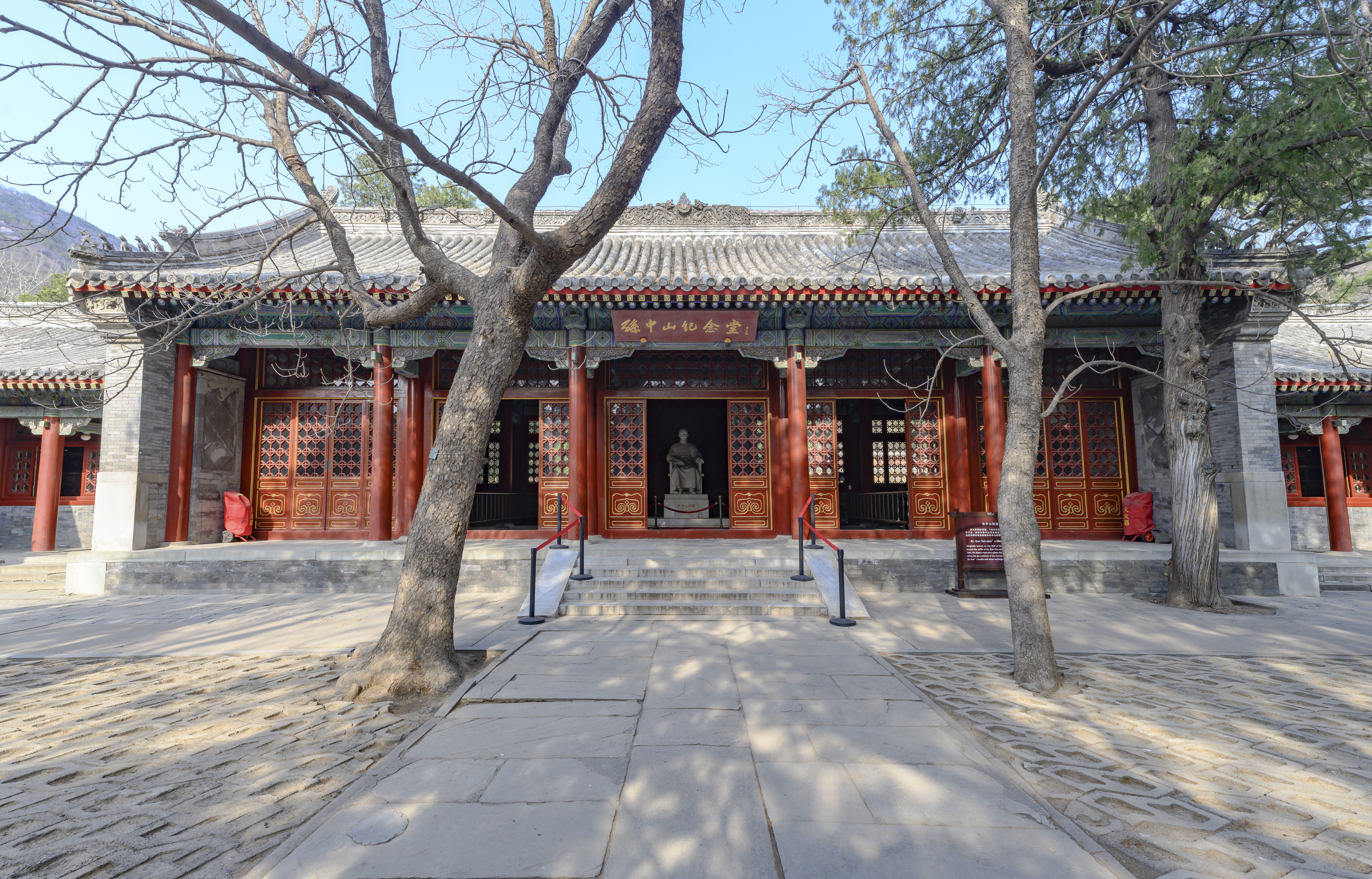
Sun Yat-Sen Memorial Hall

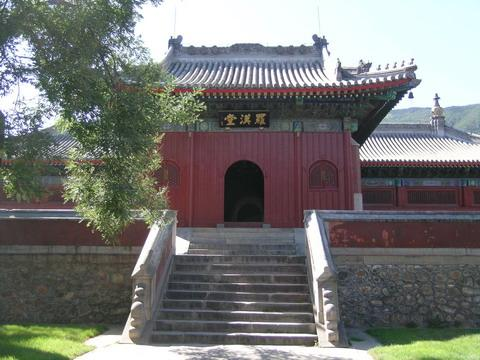
Arhat Hall

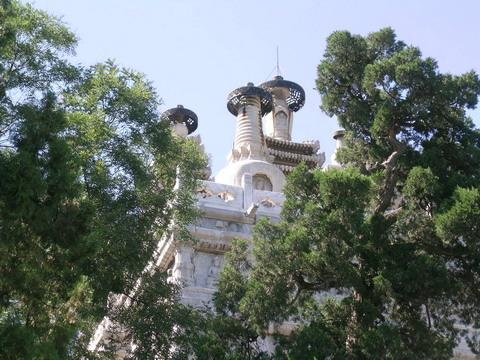
Vajrasana Pagoda

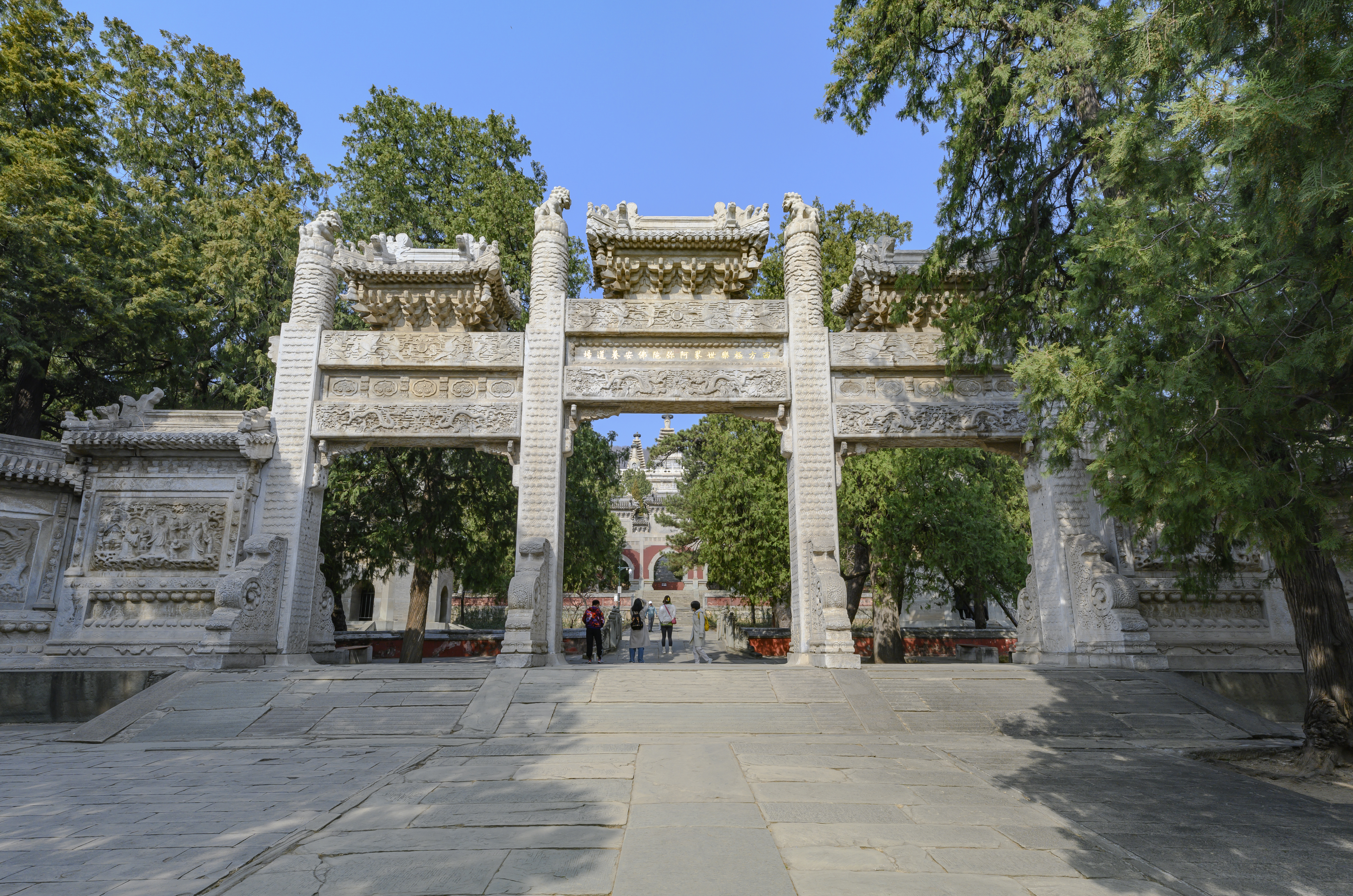
Stone Paifang

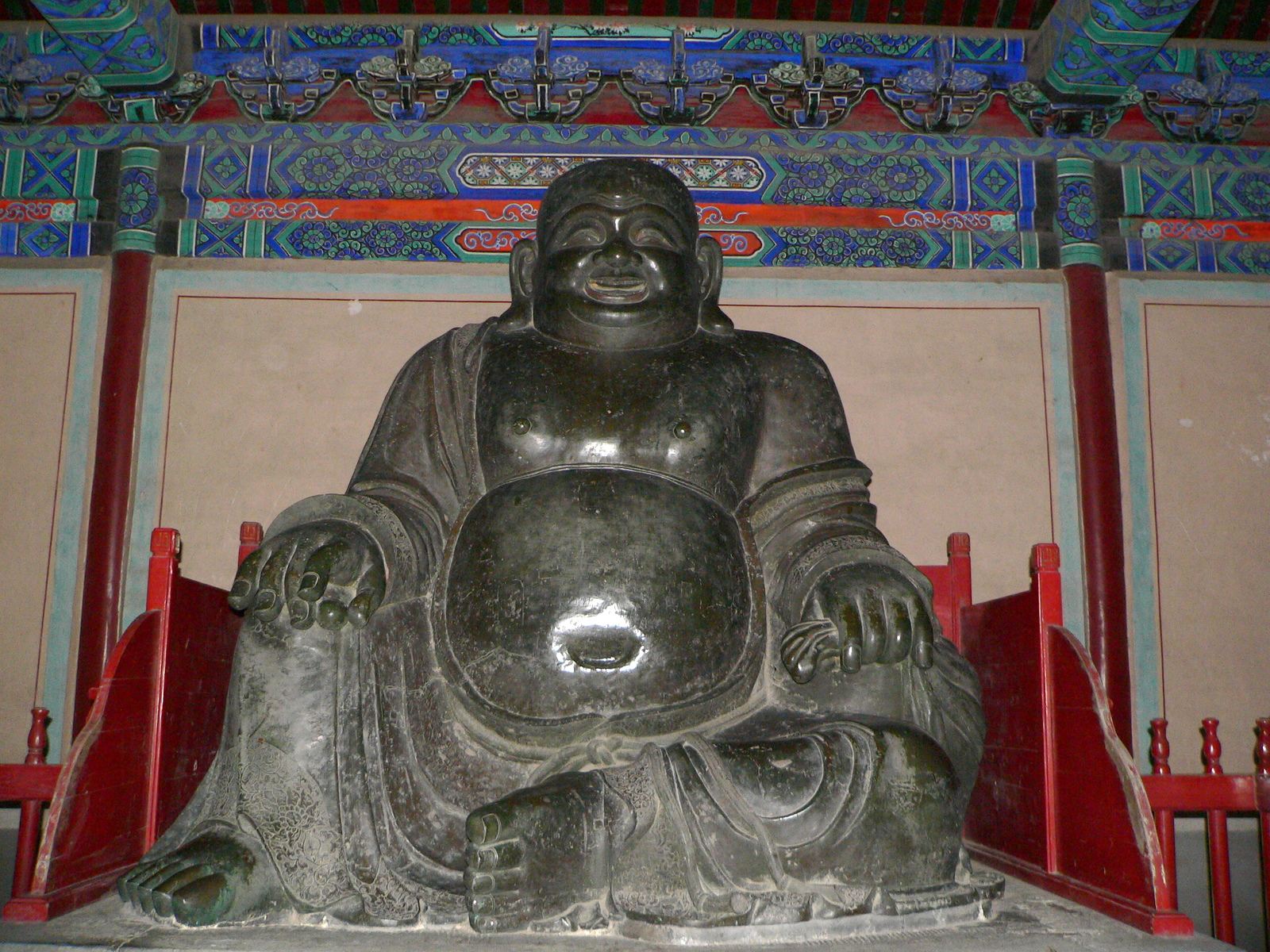
Statue of Budai

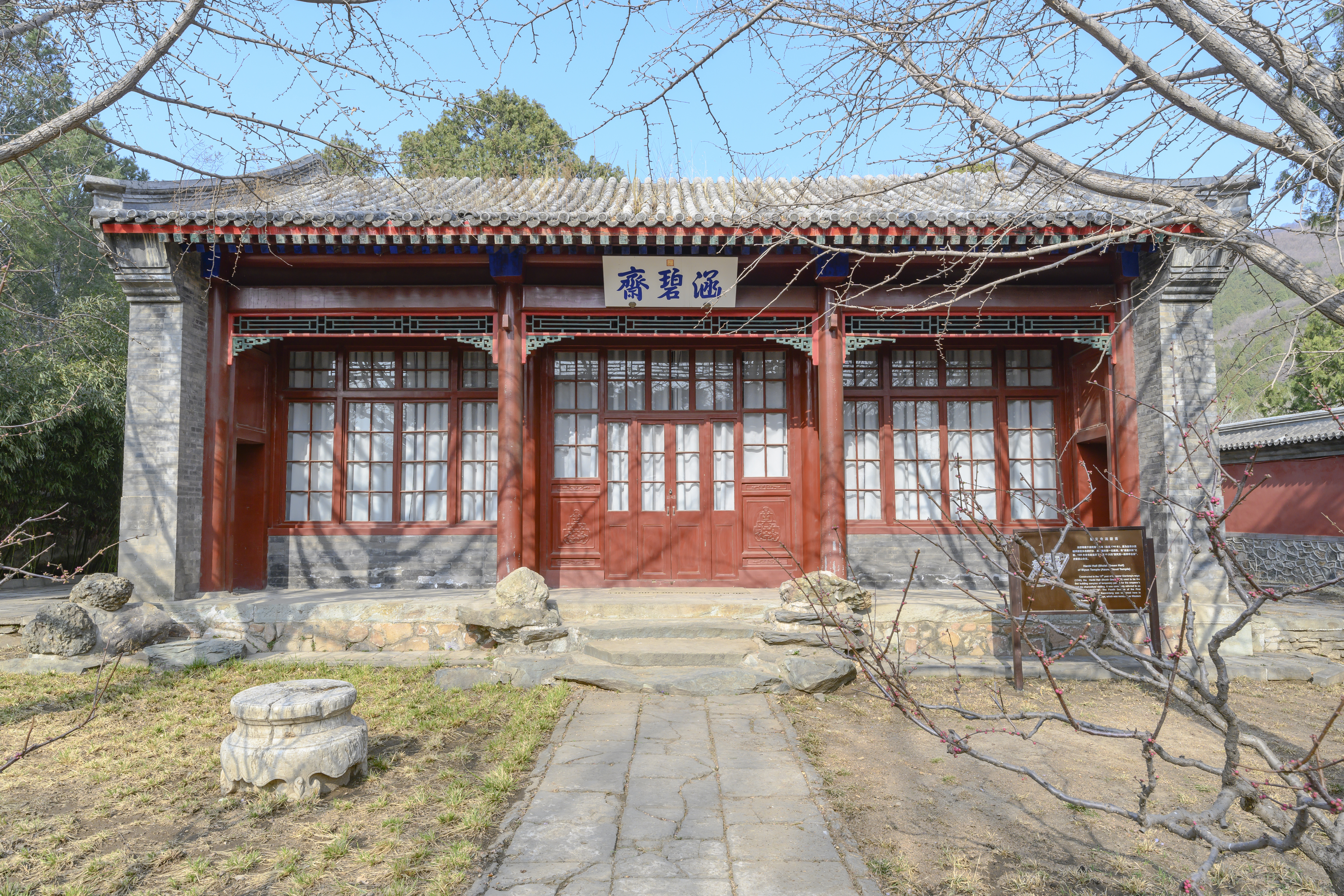
Hanbi Studio

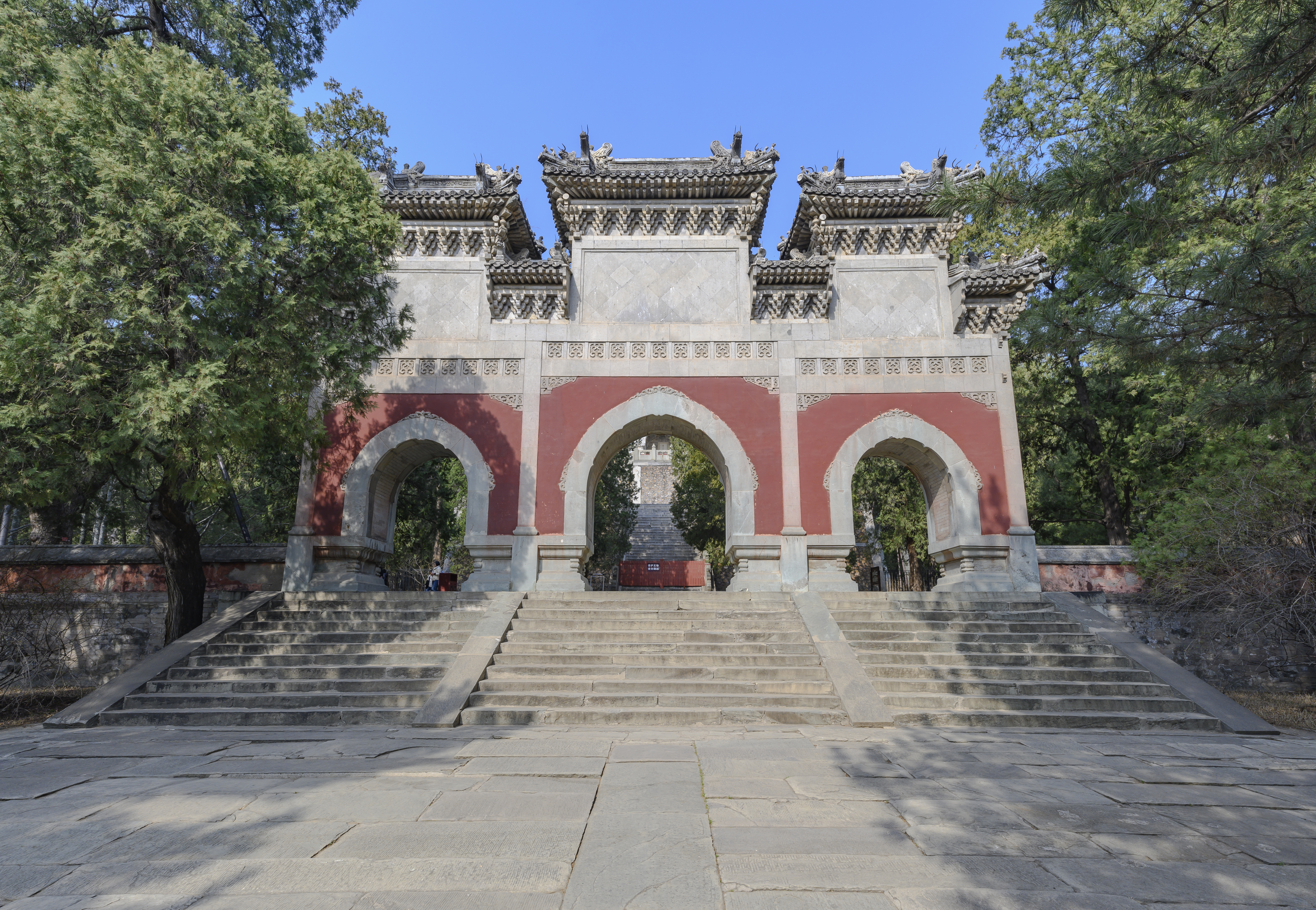
Wooden Paifang

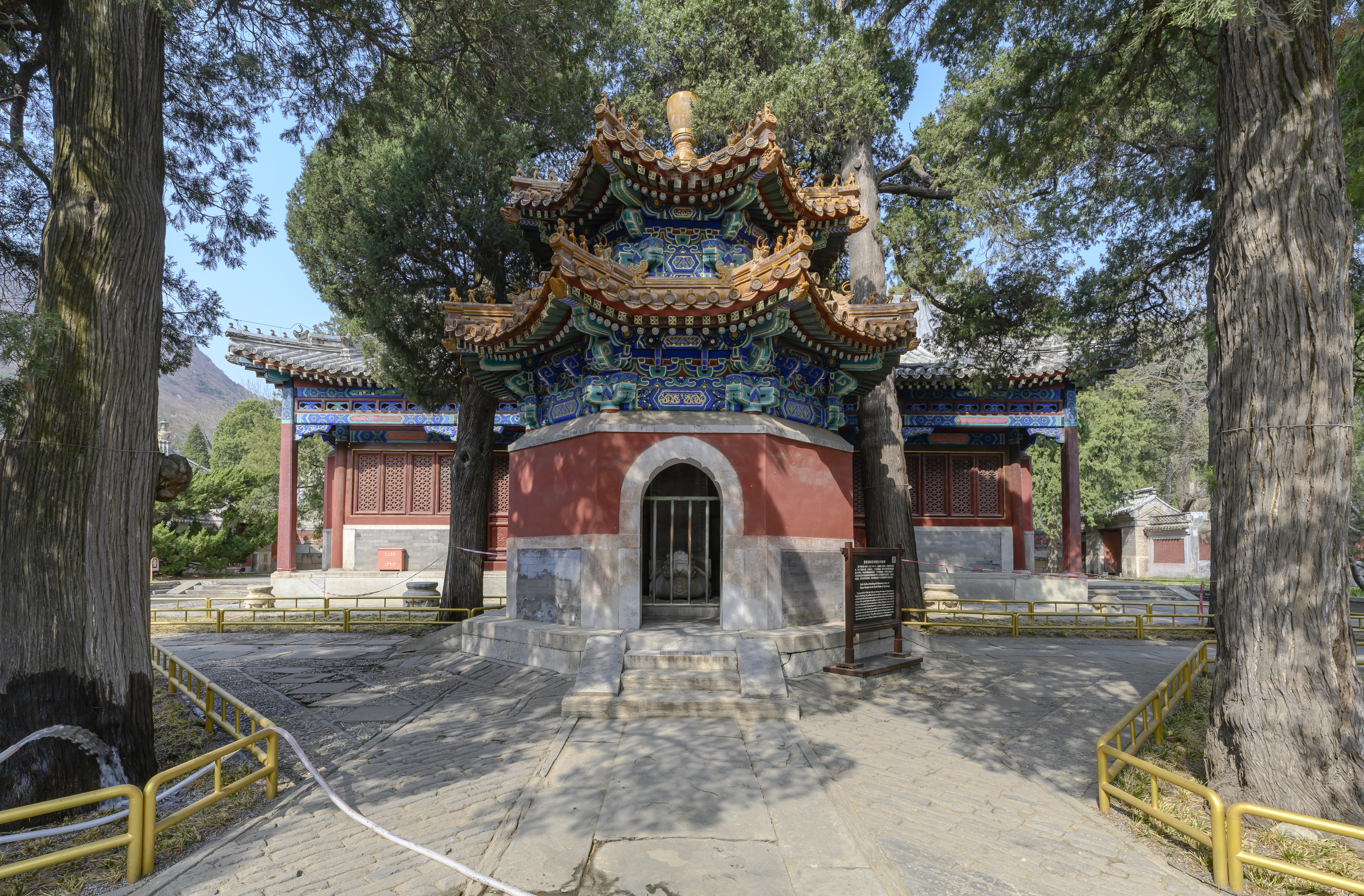
Stele pavillion
