= Ragibagh Khan =

Emperor of Yuan dynasty in 1328

Tianshun Emperor of Yuan 元天順帝 ᠷᠠᠵᠠᠪᠠᠭ ᠬᠠᠭᠠᠨ
- 11th Khagan of the Mongol Empire (Nominal due to the empire's division); Emperor of China (7th Emperor of the Yuan dynasty)
- Ragibagh Khan in 14th century portrait

Emperor of the Yuan dynasty
- Reign: 4 October 1328 – 14 November 1328
- Coronation: 4 October 1328
- Predecessor: Taiding Emperor
- Successor: Jayaatu Khan Tugh Temür
- Born: 25 April 1320
- Died: 14 November 1328 (aged 8)
Names
- Mongolian: ᠷᠠᠵᠠᠪᠠᠭ; Chinese: 阿剌(里)吉八; Ragibagh
Era dates
- Tianshun (天順) 1328
Posthumous name
- None
Temple name
- None
- House: Borjigin
- Dynasty: Yuan
- Father: Yesün Temür
- Mother: Babukhan

Ragibagh (Mongolian:ᠷᠠᠴᠠᠪᠠᠭ Рагибаха or ᠷᠠᠵᠠᠪᠠᠭ Ражабаг; Chinese: 阿剌吉八; Arigabag), also known by his era name as the Tianshun Emperor of Yuan (Chinese: 元天順帝; 1320–1328), was a son of Yesün Temür (Taiding Emperor) who was briefly installed to the throne of the Yuan dynasty in Shangdu in 1328. Although he should have been the seventh ruler of the Yuan dynasty in succession to his father Yesün Temür, he was dethroned by his rival Tugh Temür (Emperor Wenzong) who was installed by a coup before Ragibagh's succession. Apart from Emperor of China, he is regarded as the 11th Great Khan of the Mongol Empire, although it was only nominal due to the division of the empire. He was the shortest-reigning Yuan emperor.

== Life ==
Restored paintings by modern artists. Contemporary portraits do not exist or have been destroyed

Ragibagh was the eldest son of Yesün Temür. His mother Babukhan Khatun came from the Khunggirad clan, who had held power through marriage to the imperial family. He became Crown Prince at infancy in 1324. In August 1328 when Yesün Temür suddenly died in Shangdu, he was installed by the powerful Muslim officer Dawlat Shah there in the next month.

However, Yesün Temür's sudden death triggered an uprising of an anti-mainstream faction who had been dissatisfied with monopolization of power by Yesün Temür's aides including Dawlat Shah who had served him since he was stationed in Mongolia as Jinong. In the eighth month, the Mongolized Qipchaq commander El Temür, who was stationed in Dadu, launched a coup and called for installation of Khayishan's son. Tugh Temür was welcomed into Dadu in the same month in which Ragibagh ascended to the throne.

The civil war known as the War of the Two Capitals soon broke out. Ragibagh's army broke through the Great Wall at several points and advanced on Dadu; but was severely defeated by El Temür's troops. At the time, most of Ragibagh's army were involved on the Great Wall front, and the Shangdu court was compelled to surrender on the very next day. Dawlat Shah and most of the leading loyalists were taken prisoner and later executed by the Dadu faction after surrender; but Ragibagh is said to have disappeared after that, evidently murdered.

== Name ==
Due to scarcity of historical sources and their multilinguality, Ragibagh's name has a lot of variants. The Tibetan Red Annals (Hu lān deb ther) calls him "ra khyi phag" (Standard Tibetan: ར་ཁྱི་ཕག). The later Mongolian chronicles such as the Erdeni-yin tobchi and the Altan tobchi spell him Radzibaγ or Raǰibaγ. The History of the Yuan refers to him as A-su-ji-ba (阿速吉八), but it is apparently a misspelling of A-la-ji-ba (阿剌吉八). The initial "a" prevents the word from starting with "r" in Mongolian. It looks like a modern Mongolian painter Ts.Mandir interpreted his name as "Asidkebe" (Ашидхэв). According to some scholars, his name was from Sanskrit "rāja-pika" (राज पिक), which means "king cuckoo". He is also commonly known as the Tianshun Emperor based on his era name.

== See also ==
- List of emperors of the Yuan dynasty
- List of Mongol rulers
- List of rulers of China
- War of the Two Capitals

Ragibagh Khan House of Borjigin Born: 1320 Died: 14 November 1328
Regnal titles
| Preceded by Yesün Temür Khan, Emperor Taiding of Yuan | Great Khan of the Mongol Empire (Nominal due to the empire's division); 4 October 1328 – 14 November 1328 | Succeeded by Jayaatu Khan, Emperor Wenzong |
| Preceded by Yesün Temür Khan, Emperor Taiding of Yuan | Emperor of the Yuan dynasty Emperor of China; 4 October 1328 – 14 November 1328 | Succeeded by Jayaatu Khan, Emperor Wenzong |
