= Dzungar conquest of Yenisei =

Part of the Dzungar-Russian conflicts, 1665–1667

Invasion of Yenisei
- Part of the Dzungar–Russian conflicts of Russian conquest of Siberia and Oirat–Khalkha Wars
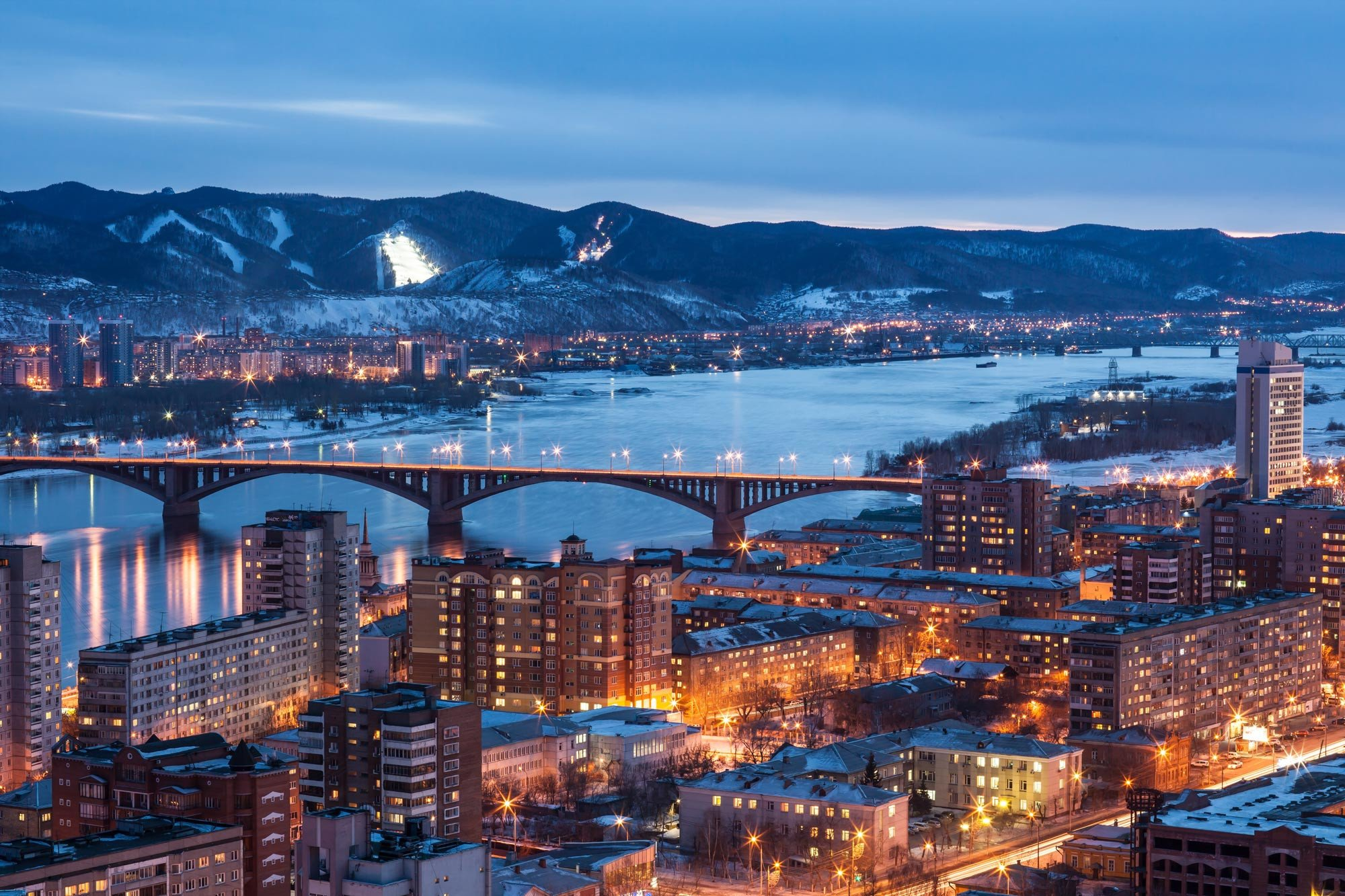
- Modern day Krasnoyarsk city on the Yenisei river.
Date	1665–1667
Location	Yenisei river, Russia and Mongolia
Result	Dzungar victory: Peace agreement with the Russians; Dzungars subjugate the Kyrgyz residing on the Yenisei river
Territorial changes	Annexation of the Altan Khanate; Annexation of the Yenisei

Belligerents
Dzungar Khanate; Supported by: Khakas	Tsardom of Russia	Altan Khanate

Commanders and leaders
(Dzungar Khanate) Sengge	(Tsardom of Russia) Rodion Koltsov (POW)	Erinchin Lobsang Tayiji (POW)

Strength
Unknown	Unknown	Unknown

Casualties and losses
Unknown	Heavy	Heavy

The Dzungar conquest of Yenisei was a military campaign by the Khong tayiji of the Dzungar Khanate, Sengge against the Tsardom of Russia and Altan Khan of the Khalkhas on the Yenisei river. This part of a series of conflict of the Dzungar–Russian conflicts and the ongoing Oirat–Khalkha Wars. Which allowed for the Dzungar annexation of the Altan Khan of the Khalkhas and the Yenisei River.

== Background ==
During the reign of Erdeni Batur, the relations between the Khalkhas and the Russians were friendly — as the young prince had maintained a peace with the Khalkas, forming the pact of the Oirats and the Khalkhas or "Khalkha–Oirat Ikh Tsaaz" on 1640 and the with allowing the Russians access to salt mines and trade relations. However, after his death in 1653, Sengge had succeeded him with the help of Ochirtu of the Khoshut Khanate. He soon severed ties with the Tsardom of Russia and the Altan Khanate — intending to take his father's(Erdeni) and grandfather's (Kharkhul) "Kyrgyz Land".

== Invasion ==
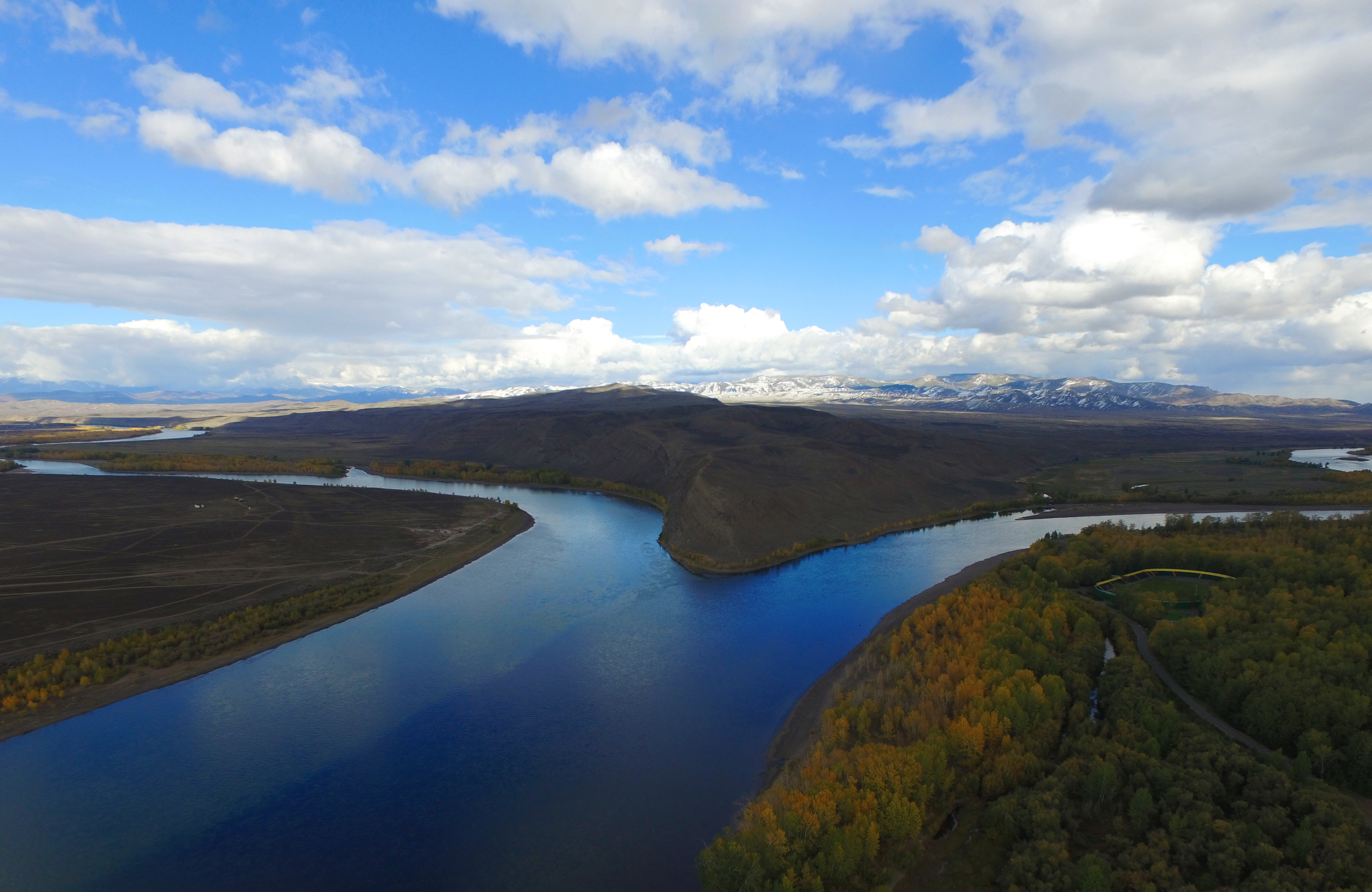
The Yenisei river.

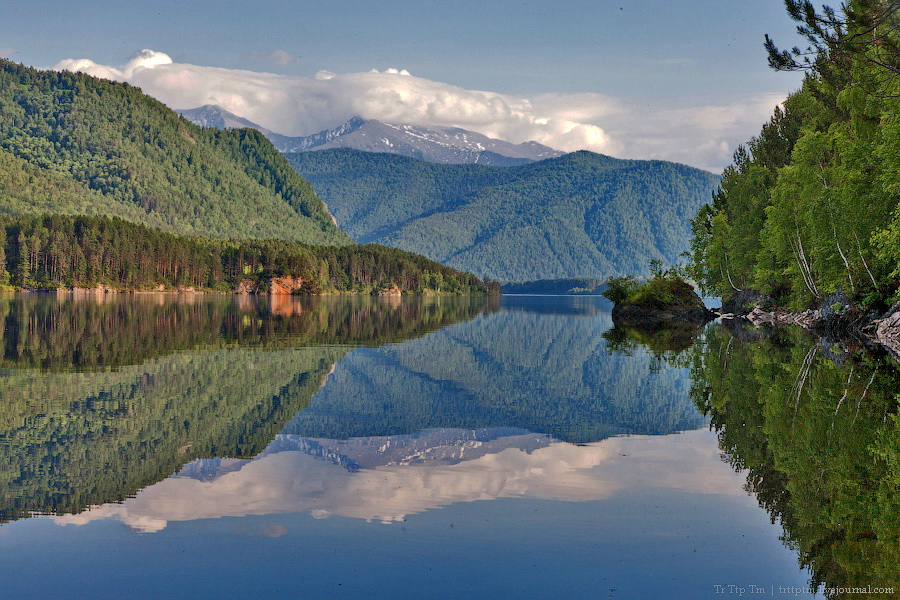
The river flowing through the Shushensky Forest.

In 1665, the invasion started with Sengge invading the towards Krasnoyarsk with the help of the Khakas people, They fought a Russian force led by Rodion Koltsov, as the Dzungars had sacked and plundered nearby towns near Krasnoyarsk. However he was defeated and taken as POW. In 1666, Sengge attacked the Altan Khan at Yenisei — who also was campaigning on Yenisei river, the Dzungars battled the Khotogoid army and captured Erinchin Lobsang Tayiji as a POW. With his defeat, Sengge subjugated the Kyrgyz population, and proceeded to annex the Altan Khanate. Soon in 1667, Sengge had sieged the city of Krasnoyarsk, as he blockaded the city and reduced its population by starvation. He had demanded the Russian government to recognize him as the Suzerian or Hegemon of the Kyrgyz population, and to release the yaask paying Kyrgyz people to him but soon he had left, after the Russians had agreed to his terms.

== Aftermath ==
The peace between the Dzungars and Russians continued again, however Dzungar forces led by Baigorok tayiji invaded Russia again on the Biya river and the Kuznetsk basin—which the Dzungars destroyed Russian settlements and annexed the region.
