= Queen Anu =

Anu
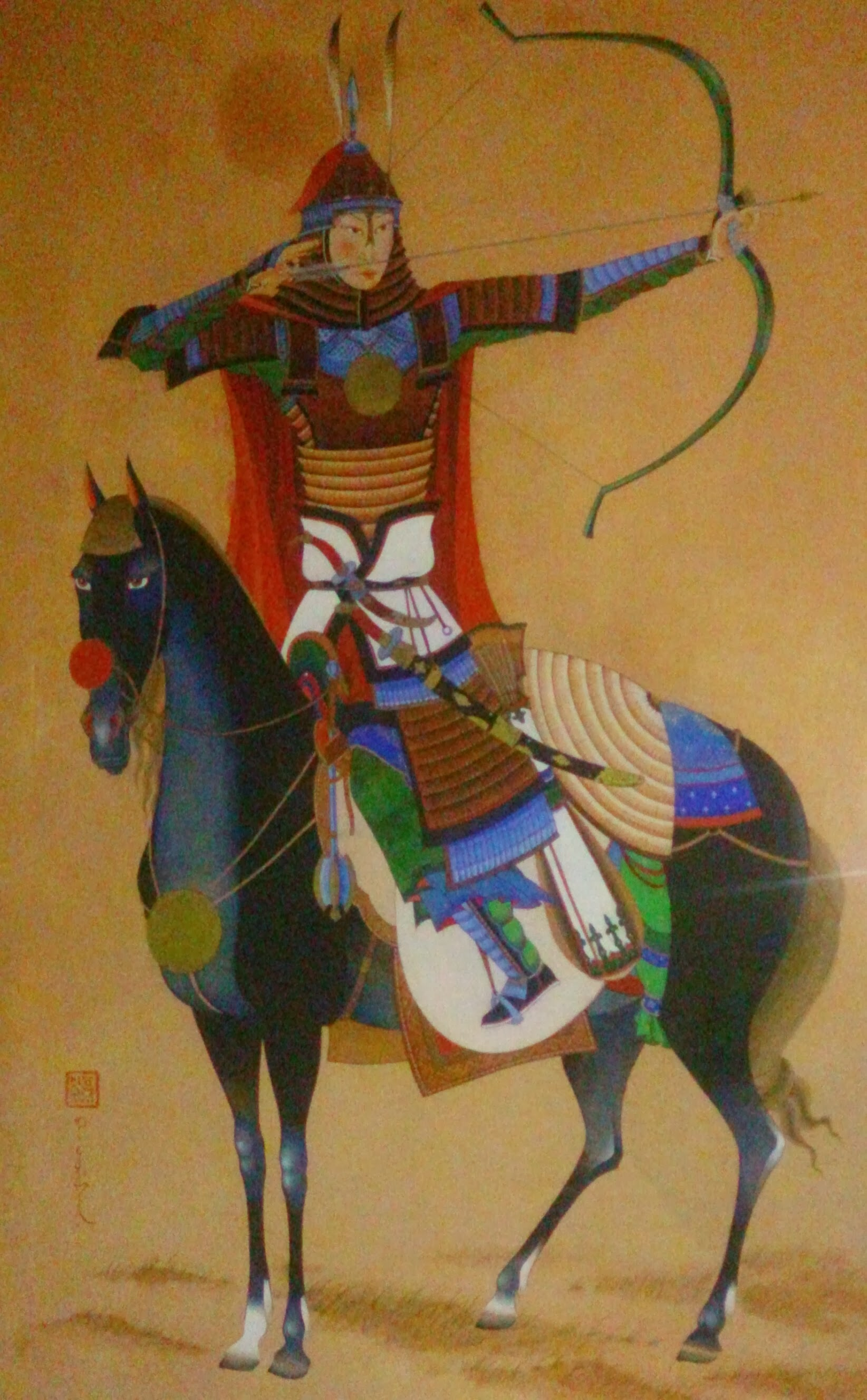
- Contemporary image by Mongolian artist Dolgoon, depicting Queen Anu at the battle of Zuunmod

Queen of Dzungar Khanate
- Predecessor: Yum-Agas
- Born: c. 1653
- Died: June 12, 1696 (aged 42–43); Terelj, Tüsheet Khan
- Burial: Khotont, Arkhangai Province, Mongolia
- Spouse: Sengge; Galdan Boshugtu Khan
- House: Borjigin

Queen Anu or Lady Anu (Note: Mongolian: Ану Хатан ᠠᠨᠤ ᠬᠠᠲᠤᠨ) (also known as Anu-Dara; died 1696) was a queen consort who led warriors into battle at the founding of the Dzungar Khanate in the late 17th century.

== Biography ==
Anu was the granddaughter of Ochirtu Secen Khan of Khoshut (or his youngest daughter according to some written historical sources), who was the nephew and adopted son of Güshi Khan. She wed prince Sengge, son of Erdeni Batur, regarded as the founder of the Dzungar Khanate. After Sengge's assassination by his half-brothers Chechen Tayiji and Zotov Batur in 1670, Anu married Sengge's successor, his brother Galdan Boshughtu Khan (1644–1697), who had spent ten years in Tibet as a Buddhist monk. With troops provided by Ochirtu, Galdan avenged his brother's death and assumed the Dzungar Khanate throne.

Galdan relied on Anu for counsel throughout his reign as he expanded Dzungar Mongol rule from the west end of the Great Wall of China to present-day eastern Kazakhstan, and from present-day northern Kyrgyzstan to southern Siberia. Fearing the rise of a new Mongol empire, the Qing dynasty sent three armies west towards Mongolia in 1696. The Qing Kangxi Emperor personally led the expeditionary forces. Galdan moved his army south from the Khentii Mountains to meet the Qing army's western column at the Battle of Jao Modo in May 1696, but his troops were soon surrounded by the superior Qing forces.

Anu led a counterattack which enabled her husband to escape from the enemy encirclement. Although Galdan managed to flee with a small remnant of his supporters, Anu was killed by enemy arquebus fire during her charge. She was buried in the foothills of Khangai mountains in an area now referred to as "Khatant" (place of the queen) in present-day Khotont soum of Arkhangai Province.

== Family ==
She had a son and two daughters from her marriage to Galdan Boshughtu:

- Sebteng Baljur (色布騰巴爾珠爾)
- Juncahai (Mongolian: Юнчихай)
- Boum (Mongolian: Бум)

== Cultural references ==
In 1975, the celebrated Mongolian author Byambyn Rinchen (1905-1977) published his novel Ану хатан "Lady Anu" about the life and death of the eponymous 17th century Mongol Dzungar Khanate queen. The novel went on to become a classic of Mongolian literature and is required reading in Mongolian schools. In 2010, Mongolian novelist Baatarsuren Shuudertsetseg published Домогт Ану хатан (The Legendary Queen Anu). The importance of family, women's empowerment, and national identity were central themes of her treatment of Anu's life. It was named National Book of the Year for Mongolian Literature and was adapted for the stage and opened at the National Academic Drama Theatre in March 2011. Shuudertsetseg then adapted The Legendary Queen Anu as a full-length feature film in 2012. Queen Ahno - Spirit of a Warrior, also titled Warrior Princess, became the most expensive Mongolian film ever made and went on to become one of Mongolia's highest-grossing films.
