= Baatarsuren Shuudertsetseg =

Mongolian author

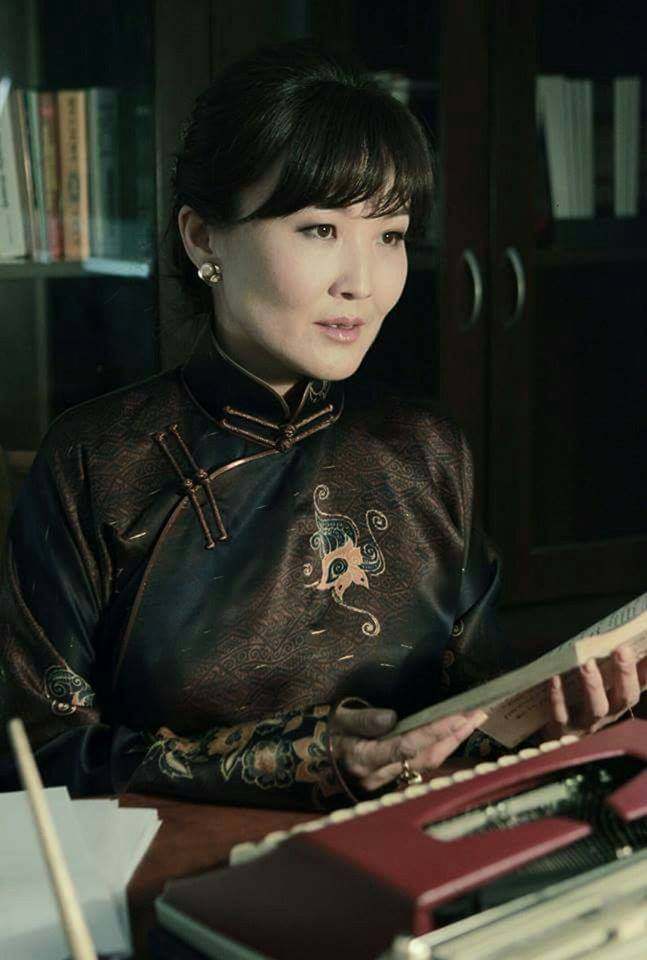
- Born: Baatarsuren Togtokhbayar; 18 January 1971 (age 55); Ulaanbaatar, Mongolia
- Citizenship: Mongolian
- Occupations: Author, filmmaker, humanitarian
- Spouse: B.Boldkhuyag (m. 1991)
- Children: 3
- Writing career
- Years active: 1995–present
- Genres: Young Adult novels, Historical novels

Baatarsuren Togtokhbayar (Mongolian: Баатарсүрэнгийн Тогтохбаяр; born 18 January 1971), known by her pen name Shuudertsetseg (Шүүдэрцэцэг) is a Mongolian journalist, author, filmmaker, and humanitarian. She has received numerous Mongolian literary awards including "Featured Book" awards in 2007 for her novel Шүрэн бугуйвч (Shüren buguyvch; 'Coral Bracelet') and in 2008 for her CD Шүүдэрцэцэг ('Shuudertsetseg'). Her 2010 novel Домогт Ану хатан (Domogt Anu khatan; 'The Legendary Queen Anu') was named National Book of the Year for Mongolian Literature. In 2012 she wrote the screenplay for, produced, and directed the film version of Домогт Ану хатан, released internationally as "Warrior Princess".

In addition to her film and writing careers, Shuudertsetseg is noted for her humanitarian efforts. In 2008, the Organizing Committee of Amnesty International Mongolia named her "Human Rights Activist of the Year" for her contributions to gender equality and human rights. She sits on the International Board of Directors of the Mongolian Women's Fund "MONES" and is a member of Amnesty International's women's group. In 1996, while working as a reporter at the daily newspaper Ардын эрх (People's Right), she was named "Journalist of the Year" for her stories on children's rights.

== Early life ==
Shuudertsetseg was born in Ulaanbaatar, Mongolia on January 18, 1971. After graduating the Mustafa Kemal Atatürk Secondary School (Public School No. 5) in 1989, she went on to study Journalism at Russia's Irkutsk State University and then pursued post graduate studies at the National University of Mongolia in Ulaanbaatar. She graduated in 1995 with a master's degree in journalism and worked as a journalist covering the Law and Crime beat at the state-owned newspaper Ардын эрх (People's Right). In 1996 she earned the "Journalist of the Year" award for her stories on children's rights. She was spokesperson for Mongolia's Democratic Party government under Prime Minister Mendsaikhan Enkhsaikhan in 1997, but then joined the "Anons" journalism center as its director a year later in 1998. From 1999 to 2000 she was the executive director of the Mongolian Union of Journalists and in 2001 she became editor of the Алтан шар сонин (Golden Orange Newspaper). It was during her tenure at Алтан шар сонин that she adopted the pen name Shuudertsetseg recommended by her husband.

== Career ==
Shuudertsetseg published her first novel Хулан (Khulan) in 2003. Several popular novels followed, including; Шүрэн бугуйвч (Coral Bracelet), Э-майлаар илгээсэн захиа сарнай (Rose Sent by Email), Үйсэн дээрх бичээс (Script Carved on Wood), Чимээгүй хашгираан (Silent Scream), Цасан нулимс (Snow Tears), Зургадугаар сарын цас (June Snow), Сэтгэлийн анир (Spiritual Peace), and Novels. Her early works dealt mainly with themes of Mongolian national and cultural identity and the struggles of young adults living in modern-day Mongolia.

In 2009, she and her daughter Amina translated The Diary of a Young Girl by Anne Frank (Анне Франкийн өдрийн тэмдэглэл) into Mongolian. That same year she published a collection of biographies of prominent female writers Дэлхийн алдартай эмэгтэй зохиолчид (World's Best Women Writers).

Shuudertsetseg then turned to writing historical fiction and in 2010 published Домогт Ану хатан (The Legendary Queen Anu) about the eponymous 17th century Mongol Dzungar Khanate queen who led troops and died at the Battle of Zuunmod in 1696. The work touched on themes found in her earlier works, including the importance of family, women's empowerment, and national identity. It was named National Book of the Year for Mongolian Literature and was adapted for the stage and opened at the National Academic Drama Theatre in March 2011. Shuudertsetseg adapted The Legendary Queen Anu as a full-length feature film in 2012. She wrote the screenplay, produced and directed Queen Ahno - Spirit of a Warrior, also titled Warrior Princess, which became the most expensive Mongolian film ever made. It was released in January 2013 and went on to become one of Mongolia's highest-grossing films. It received awards for best film, best male actor, and best investment from Mongolia's national movie awards. In 2014 her film company Shuuder Productions followed up with the drama Улаан Пальто (Red Coat).

In 2015 she returned to historical fiction with Үүлэн хээтэй орчлон (Cloud-Shaped World) which weaved themes of Buddhism and karma against the backdrop of Mongolia's early 20th century struggle for independence. This novel was the basis of a 2018 film by Mongol Content. Shuudertsetseg followed up with yet another historical novel, Хотол Цагаан Гүнж (Princess Khutulun), in 2017. Recounting the exploits of Mongolia's famous "wrestling princess" Khutulun, the work remained at the top of Mongolia's national bestseller list for a whole year. In 2019 she published its sequel Уулсын Домог Хотулун (Khutulun; The Legend of the Hills). Shuuder Productions then began production on a Princess Khutulun movie based on her books. In 2018 she published the adventure novel, улаан могой (Red Serpent), which became a national bestseller. Her 2018 historical novel Хүйлэн Огторгуйн Заадас about the life of Tsendiin Dondogdulam, the queen consort of Mongolia's last Bogd Khan, was awarded Mongolia's prestigious Order of the Polar Star medal. In 2019, she published Хагацашгүй (Inseparable), a romance set against Mongolia's political persecutions in 1937.

== Humanitarian work ==
Shuudertsetseg is very active in promoting human rights issues, particularly gender equality in Mongolia. In 2008 the Amnesty International Mongolia Organizing Committee named her "Human Rights Activist of the Year" for her contributions to gender equality and human rights. She sits on the International Board of Directors of the Mongolian Women's Fund MONES and is a member of Amnesty International's women's group. She was active in the Women's National Peace movement that lobbied for women's rights in Mongolia's Parliament by drafting and supporting equal gender rights legislation. She is an active supporter of the Mongolian National Center Against Violence, which helps young girls and women who are victims of violence.

Many of Shuudertsetseg's literary and visual arts endeavors have highlighted gender equality and equal rights for women. Women's rights were the central theme of 180 Degrees, a television drama she wrote and which was created by her production company Shuuder Productions. On May 3, 2008 she delivered a presentation on "Renaissance of Feminism in Mongolia," at a lecture series sponsored by Amnesty International at the Mongolian State University. She has contributed to the 11Eleven Project, a documentary promoting cross cultural understanding in an increasingly globalized world and has contributed several articles on women's rights, gender bias, and equality to Mongolian and international media outlets.

== Personal life ==
She married fellow journalist B.Boldkhuyag (Б.Болдхуяг) in 1991. Together they have three daughters; Amina, Ankhilmaa, and Anima.
