= Marco Polo (2014 TV series) =

American television drama series

- Promotional poster
- Genre: Historical drama Adventure
- Created by: John Fusco
- Starring: Lorenzo Richelmy; Benedict Wong; Joan Chen; Rick Yune; Amr Waked; Remy Hii; Zhu Zhu; Tom Wu; Mahesh Jadu; Olivia Cheng; Uli Latukefu; Chin Han; Pierfrancesco Favino; Ron Yuan; Claudia Kim; Jacqueline Chan; Leonard Wu; Thomas Chaanhing; Chris Pang; Gabriel Byrne; Michelle Yeoh
- Theme music composer: Daniele Luppi
- Composers: Peter Nashel; Eric V. Hachikian
- Country of origin: United States
- Original language: English
- No. of seasons: 2
- No. of episodes: 20 + 1 special

Production
- Executive producers: Daniel Minahan; John Fusco; Harvey Weinstein; Peter Friedlander; Bob Weinstein; Joachim Rønning; Espen Sandberg; Dave Erickson; Ben Silverman; Chris Grant; Elizabeth Sarnoff; Blair Fetter; Patrick Macmanus; David C. Glasser
- Producers: Richard Sharkey; Brett Conrad; Collin Creighton; Bruce Marshall Romans
- Production locations: Malaysia; Kazakhstan; Hungary; Italy; Slovakia
- Cinematography: Romain Lacourbas; Vanja Černjul; Xavier Grobet; Gavin Struthers
- Running time: 46–65 minutes; 28 minutes (special)
- Production companies: The Weinstein Company TV; Electus; Netflix Originals
- Budget: $200 million

Original release
- Network: Netflix
- Release: December 12, 2014 – July 1, 2016

Marco Polo is an American drama television series inspired by Marco Polo's early years in the court of Kublai Khan, the Khagan of the Mongol Empire and the founder of the Yuan dynasty (1271–1368). The show premiered on Netflix on December 12, 2014. The series was created by John Fusco and stars Lorenzo Richelmy in the title role, with Benedict Wong as Kublai Khan. It was produced by The Weinstein Company. On January 7, 2015, Marco Polo was renewed by Netflix for a 10-episode second season, which premiered on July 1, 2016.

On December 12, 2016, Netflix announced that they had canceled Marco Polo after two seasons. Sources told The Hollywood Reporter that the two seasons resulted in a $200 million loss for Netflix, and the decision to cancel was jointly taken by Netflix and The Weinstein Company.

== Cast and characters ==
=== Main ===
- Lorenzo Richelmy as Marco Polo, the son of a Venetian merchant who travels to China and is ultimately left there as a guest of Kublai Khan, rising to official position in the court.
- Benedict Wong as Kublai Khan, the fifth Great Khan of the Mongol Empire. Wong also stars in the Christmas special "One Hundred Eyes".
- Joan Chen as Empress Chabi, the Khan's favorite and most important wife who is a valued unofficial adviser.
- Rick Yune as Kaidu, the Khan's cousin and rival, leader of the House of Ögedei
- Amr Waked as Yusuf (season 1), the Khan's Vice Regent
- Remy Hii as Prince Jingim, the Khan's lawful son and heir.
- Zhu Zhu as Nergui a.k.a. Princess Kokachin, a servant of Princess Kokachin, the Blue Princess of the Bayaut tribe, who disguises herself as the Princess.
- Tom Wu as Hundred Eyes, a blind Taoist monk willfully enslaved to the Khan and sifu to Jingim and Marco Polo. Wu also stars in the Christmas special "One Hundred Eyes".
- Mahesh Jadu as Ahmad, a Persian Muslim from Bukhara who is the Khan's Minister of Finance and adopted son.
- Olivia Cheng as Jia Mei Lin, concubine of the late Emperor Lizong of Song and sister to chancellor Jia Sidao
- Uli Latukefu as Byamba, the Khan's bastard son, a general of both the imperial army and the Mongol horde
- Chin Han as Jia Sidao, (Note: Chin Han only appears in one episode of season two, although credited as a main cast member.) the chancellor to the Song Emperors Huaizong and Duanzong, and Mei Lin's brother
- Pierfrancesco Favino as Niccolò Polo, a Venetian merchant and Marco's father
- Ron Yuan as Prince Nayan (season 2), Kublai's uncle and a Nestorian Christian
- Claudia Kim as Khutulun (season 2; recurring, season 1), Kaidu's daughter and favored child, niece of the Khan, and a superb warrior
- Jacqueline Chan as Shabkana (season 2), Kaidu's mother
- Leonard Wu as Orus (season 2), Kaidu's son
- Thomas Chaanhing as Gerel (season 2), a khan loyal to Kaidu
- Chris Pang as Arban (season 2), a khan loyal to Kaidu
- Gabriel Byrne as Pope Gregory X (season 2) (Note: Gabriel Byrne only appears in one episode of season two, although credited as a main cast member.)
- Michelle Yeoh as Lotus (season 2), a Taoist nun and the designated protector of the Song Dynasty's boy emperor. Yeoh also stars in the Christmas special "One Hundred Eyes".

=== Recurring ===
- Corrado Invernizzi as Maffeo Polo (season 1), Marco's uncle
- Tan Kheng Hua as Xie Daoqing (season 1), empress dowager of the Song Dynasty
- Lawrence Makoare as Za Bing (season 1), Princess Kokachin's eunuch protector
- Vanessa Vanderstraaten as Princess Sorga (season 1), one of Jingim's wives
- Patrick Teoh as General Red Brow (season 1)
- Shu An Oon as Jing Fei (season 1), Mei Lin's friend, also an imperial concubine
- Chloe Luthi (season 1) and Jaime Chew (season 2) as Ling Ling, the daughter of Mei Lin and the former Emperor of the Song Dynasty
- Nicholas Bloodworth as Tulga (season 1), Kokachin's guardian
- Max Kellady as Emperor Duzong, the son of the empress dowager and the former Emperor of the Song Dynasty
- Soffi Jikan as Milo Boy (season 1)
- Mano Maniam as The Old Man / Hassan-i Sabbah (season 1)
- Daniel Tuiara as Sukh (season 2), Ahmad's sworn Burmese warrior
- Tosh Zhang as Bai (season 2)
- Byambadorj Altanhuyag as General Qaban (season 2)
- Esther Low as Kokachin (season 2; guest, season 1), the real Blue Princess of the Mongol Bayaut tribe
- Jason Chong as General Kasar (season 2)
- Chew Kin Wah as Song Loyalist 1 (season 2)
- Karishma Ahluwalia as Oksana, Ahmad's mother (season 2)

=== Notable guest stars ===
- Baljinnyamyn Amarsaikhan as Ariq Böke (season 1), the Khan's brother, overseer of Karakorum
- Darwin Shaw as Sabbah (season 1)
- Togo Igawa as Chuluun (season 2)

== Production ==
The series was originally developed at Starz, which had picked up the series in January 2012. After attempts to film in China failed, the project was released back to The Weinstein Company. Netflix then picked up the series for a 10-episode season, for approximately $90 million, making it one of the most expensive TV shows in the world, second to Game of Thrones. The project was officially announced at Netflix in January 2014. Joachim Rønning and Espen Sandberg serve as executive producers and directed the pilot and second episodes, "The Wayfarer" and "The Wolf and the Deer", respectively. The series was filmed in Kazakhstan, Italy, and at Pinewood Studios in Malaysia, as well as at outdoor locations in Malaysia, particularly tropical wilderness, as well as Slovakia and Hungary. Kazakhstan doubled as the steppes of Mongolia, Malaysia was the base of operations as well as serving as a location, Hungary provided a setting for Renaissance Rome, and Slovakia provided some mountain settings for Season 2.

Stuntman Ju Kun was working on the show alongside fight choreographer Brett Chan, but went missing with the disappearance of Malaysia Airlines Flight MH370 during pre-production.

To prepare for her role as Chabi, Joan Chen read the book The Secret History of the Mongol Queens by Jack Weatherford, as she wanted her performance to reflect the culture of the time period.

During his extensive research, show creator John Fusco traveled the Silk Road by horseback and also crossed the Ming Sha Dunes of Western China on camel. In Venice he sought out and studied the last will and testament of Marco Polo. While some Mongolian viewers and experts view it as "riddled with historical errors", many have praised the series. Orgil Makhaan, who played Genghis Khan in a BBC documentary, said it was more accurate than any previous foreign portrayal of Mongolian culture. "As a Mongol and an artist, Marco Polo makes me feel like our dreams are coming true," he told AFP. "I watched all 10 episodes in just one day."

=== Music ===
The series featured music by Mongolian bands Altan Urag and Batzorig Vaanchig, a famous throat singer, who cameoed as a singer. Daniele Luppi composed the main theme, whilst Peter Nashel and Eric V. Hachikian are the composers of the original score.

== Episodes ==
Series overview
Season	Episodes	Originally released
1	10	December 12, 2014
Special	1	December 26, 2015
2	10	July 1, 2016

=== Season 1 (2014) ===
No. overall	No. in season	Title	Directed by	Written by	Original release date
1	1	"The Wayfarer"	Joachim Rønning & Espen Sandberg	John Fusco	December 12, 2014
After three years crossing seas, deserts and the Silk Road, a young Marco Polo finds himself a prisoner of the great Kublai Khan.
2	2	"The Wolf and the Deer"	Joachim Rønning & Espen Sandberg	John Fusco	December 12, 2014
Kublai Khan learns of betrayal by his brother Ariq of Karakorum during the siege of the farming city of WuChang. Kublai battles his warmonger brother for rule over Mongolia. As the two great mongol armies are arrayed against each other, Kublai and Ariq face off mano-a-mano. Marco learns that justice in Khan's Imperial City is swift as it is deadly.
3	3	"Feast"	Alik Sakharov	Michael Chernuchin	December 12, 2014
Marco begins a dangerous relationship with the beautiful Blue Princess Kokachin as tensions grow between Kublai and Xiangyang's cunning chancellor. From Hundred Eyes, Marco learns about Kung Fu, supreme skill from hard work, and how practice, preparation, and repetition creates mastery. The chancellor demonstrates the power of Praying Mantis Kung Fu. The Song chancellor sends the heads of Mongol warriors to the Khan. Marco finds out that Kokachin is the last of Bauyat tribe. Kublai's wife counsels Kublai to choose wisdom over wrath. Marco wrestles with a flirtatious Khutulun at the feast. Jingim complains to Kublai about his humiliation at the feast. Kublai questions Marco, who lies, which has shocking results. Marco rides to Kokachin's message tree, and is attacked by a deadly concealed snake.
4	4	"The Fourth Step"	Alik Sakharov	Brett Conrad	December 12, 2014
As war looms with the walled city of Xiangyang, Prince Jingim tests his diplomacy skills with the Song while Kublai questions Marco's allegiance. Song Chancellor Jia Sidao manipulates politics under the Dowager Empress, regent to the 5-year-old Emperor Apparent. Marco's father and uncle return. Marco seeks a sword from his father to protect Blue Princess Kokachin. Vice Regent Yusuf imprisons Marco, his father, and his uncle for smuggling. In chains they are brought before Kublai for stealing silk worms, a crime punishable by death. Kokachin prepares for escape. Prince Jingim successfully negotiates peace with the Chinese Song envoy. Kublai charges Marco with deciding the punishment for his father and uncle's crime.
5	5	"Hashshashin"	Daniel Minahan	Patrick Macmanus	December 12, 2014
Marco searches for the mastermind behind a murderous plot, while Prince Jingim weighs the risks of retaliation. A group of three Hashshashin assassins infiltrates Kublai's palace and attempts to kill him. He is hit with scorpion poison. Marco knows where the Hashshashin are, and Prince Jingim orders a group to investigate. Kokachin advises Marco to run. Sabbah leads Byamba and Marco to a meeting with the old man of the mountain. The old man asks Marco to join them.
6	6	"White Moon"	Daniel Minahan	Dave Erickson	December 12, 2014
On the eve of an auspicious ceremony, Marco searches for the culprit behind the assassination attempted on Kublai Khan, even as a new one takes shape. Mei Lin attempts to assassinate the Mongol queen Chabi with poisoned lipstick, but instead kisses and kills one of the ladies in the harem. There is a celebration for Kublai upon his return to health, and Mei Lin tries to assassinate Chabi by force. However, she fails and is captured. Brought before Kublai, she claims she did it for Ling Ling, her daughter.
7	7	"The Scholar's Pen"	David Petrarca	Michael Chernuchin	December 12, 2014
Marco and Hundred Eyes take on a dangerous mission to infiltrate the walled city of Xiangyang, while its chancellor struggles to hold on to power. Kublai asks Marco and Hundred Eyes to infiltrate Xiangyang to kill Jia Sidao. Marco draws a plan of the city from inside the city. Hundred Eyes tries to kill Jia but fails and escapes. Marco shows Kublai that there is a weak spot in the wall and that they should mobilize now. Khutulun allows herself to be bested by Byamba and begins a romance as they start to make war plans.
8	8	"Rendering"	John Maybury	Brett Conrad	December 12, 2014
When Kublai sets his sights—and his army—on taking the walled city of Xiangyang, Marco's allegiance is tested. The village of Wu Chang, the primary supply town for Xiangyang, is taken. Za Bing, Kokachin's bodyguard is killed by Tulga. Kokachin shoots Tulga with an arrow. Kublai arrives at Xiangyang and parleys with Jia. Jia thinks that the Mongol Queen Chabi is dead, but Kublai reveals that she is alive and well. Jia realizes that he has been lied to by Zhang Fei who commits suicide in front of Jia. Byamba informs Marco that Prince Jingim suspects Marco of plotting against Kublai. Marco befriends a prisoner but is later horrified when he finds that all prisoners are being butchered and rendered as weapon fuel. He finds Kokachin in his tent, and she confesses that she is not a princess but a peasant girl that just happened to be in the palace when the Mongols invaded. She commits to Marco, and the two consummate their relationship. Kublai attacks the seemingly weak wall, but it was a trap set up by Jia Sidao. Arrows and burning oil are poured on the invaders as they are confined in a narrow wedge. Kublai gives word to retreat.
9	9	"Prisoners"	David Petrarca	Patrick Macmanus	December 12, 2014
Marco finds his fate in the hands of Kublai yet again. Meanwhile, behind the walls of Xiangyang, Chancellor Sidao sets his sights on regaining power. Marco is imprisoned by Kublai and sentenced to death because of Kublai's defeat by Jia's trap. Jingim visits him in his final hours and tells him to have patience. Ling Ling and Chabi talk. Hundred Eyes asks the Khan to pardon Marco. Jia counsels the new Emperor and replaces his Praying Mantis pet, saying there are many lessons it can teach: speed, patience, adaptability, ruthlessness. The young emperor orders the execution of traitors. Marco sketches a trebuchet used by Alexander the Great. Yusuf admits to Kublai of his complicity in the assassination attempt and the loss of troops at WuChang. Marco is freed.
10	10	"The Heavenly and Primal"	John Maybury	John Fusco	December 12, 2014
Marco's ingenuity—and loyalty—is put to the ultimate test when Kublai takes a violent and bold step in his quest to become emperor of the world. Marco helps the Khan's engineers design trebuchets. Kublai intends to attack Xiangyang with the trebuchets. Zuchou pledges 5,000 soldiers to the Chinese emperor. Kaidu of house Ogodei threatens to abandon the assault if he can't lead. Kaidu thinks the trebuchets are a gamble and abandons the Khan. Kublai tells Marco that he is counting on the trebuchets. Kokachin is to be betrothed to Jingim. She asks Marco to run away with her, presenting an anguishing choice between duty and love. The siege begins with the trebuchets outside of arrow range, and at first do not hit the wall. But with adjustments, they do breach the walls. The invasion of Xiangyang is successful. Marco finds Jia but is incapacitated by him. Hundred Eyes defeats Jia using the Praying Mantis style against him.

=== Christmas special (2015) ===
No. overall	No. in season	Title	Directed by	Written by	Original release date
–	–	"One Hundred Eyes"	Alik Sakharov	John Fusco	December 26, 2015
A 30-minute origin story of Hundred Eyes, in which a defiant warrior-monk arrives at Kublai Khan's court in chains and earns his nickname.

=== Season 2 (2016) ===
No. overall	No. in season	Title	Directed by	Written by	Original release date
11	1	"Hunter and the Sable Weaver"	Daniel Minahan	John Fusco	July 1, 2016
Much of the second season premiere is about getting reoriented in this world, establishing who these characters are and where they stand. After flashing back to a young Kublai Khan taking lessons from his grandfather, we see Kublai at home in his role, attending to trade issues while also preparing for his son's wedding. Jingim is set to marry the Blue Princess, the former love interest of Marco Polo, securing more heirs to the throne. It isn't long before the day of celebrations are spoiled, though. Kublai's bastard child Byamba shows up with a message from Kaidu, Kublai's cousin. Kaidu is still angry about not being handed the lead during the sack of Xiangyang, and he's prepared a form of retaliation. He's going to challenge the Kublai's rule as Khan in an attempt to secure the position for himself. Kublai does not accept such a ridiculous claim, but that's not the news Byamba brings back to Kaidu. There's a confrontation on the horizon this season, and it's taking place within filial boundaries. Marco Polo, along with Mei Lin, is looking for the boy emperor, the last heir of the Song Dynasty that Jia Sidao defended last season. The journey leads them past an outpost after Mei Lin uses her ties with the Red Lotus to bargain for safe passage. That leads them to a small house in the middle of the jungle where they believe the emperor is. After encountering a fight with a woman there, they find the boy emperor stashed away under the floorboards.
12	2	"Hug"	David Petrarca	Patrick Macmanus	July 1, 2016
Marco Polo and Mei Lin are traveling through the jungle with the boy emperor in their care. They're delivering the boy to Kublai, as Marco has been instructed, but their travel isn't easy. The boy's protector, who's known only as The Handmaiden, is still chasing after them, somehow able to keep up despite traveling on foot. Meanwhile, Kaidu is doing everything he can to secure support for his claim to Kublai's throne. While on the one hand it's not a difficult sell because many believe Kublai stole the election long ago, there are also those who see going against Kublai as a dangerous act. Back in the new capital of Cambulac, Kublai is taking advice from his wife. She says that he needs to accept the challenge to his throne because Kaidu is operating within the law, and any other approach would suggest weakness or deceit. Next, Marco and Mei Lin return with the boy emperor. The return sparks all kinds of intriguing relationships and power struggles. There's Kublai asserting his power over Mei Lin, even as Marco asks for leniency. There's Marco being "introduced" to the Blue Princess by Jingim and the awkwardness that follows from them being former secret romantic partners. There's also the issue of what to do with the boy emperor. While Jingim and Marco suggest letting the boy fade from the public's memory by stashing him in a safe place, Ahmad suggests killing him and parading his head through the streets to send a message. This is the same man who's working with Mei Lin to overthrow Kublai, even telling her that she could see her daughter in exchange for bringing the boy emperor to the capital. The Blue Princess has a miscarriage, but Jingim is forgiving and understanding. Kaidu has his meeting with Nayan, who's preaching Christianity to the Mongolian masses, but they can't come to an agreement for him to back Kaidu's claim to the throne. Marco also tells Kublai of the many people in south China killing themselves, as they see the Mongolian presence not as liberation but as occupation. The whole episode revolves around a single decision: Will Kublai kill the boy emperor? As Ahmad brings the boy to Kublai, and leaves the two of them alone, it's clear the emperor is conflicted. He first brandishes a dagger but then hugs the boy and consoles him for he knows he's innocent. But, as he's hugging him, he suffocates him, the boy's limp body falling to the floor as Marco stumbles upon the scene. A look of disgust crosses his face before the credits roll.
13	3	"Measure Against the Linchpin"	Daniel Minahan	Elizabeth Sarnoff	July 1, 2016
As the boy emperor hangs from the capital, and the Handmaiden takes the sight in, Kublai awakes from another nightmare, his wife still lambasting him for his decision to kill a child. Marco isn't too happy with him either, and with both in crisis, Kublai takes his Venetian friend on a hike in order to decide what to do about Kaidu's claim to the throne. The Handmaiden confronts Mei Lin - they both agree they have a common enemy. Meanwhile, the mounting pressure on the Blue Princess to produce an heir before Kaidu's claim comes to pass leads the Empress to force a stable boy with similar features to Jingim to impregnate the Blue Princess while the Empress holds her down. The Blue Princess tries to object that the resulting infant would not contain full royal blood to which the Empress responds, "actually, the baby will have no royal blood." While this is happening, Jingim goes to Karakorum to help persuade people to side with his father. That means taking down a large warrior in a wrestling match and earning some respect, though that doesn't stop Kaidu's two children from attacking them on their way home. Furthermore, Kaidu makes a bold decision and insists that his daughter Khutulun, rather than his son, will be the next heir. This episode is focused mainly on the hike. Marco and Kublai discuss death, responsibility, and fate, and they come face-to-face with a wolf several times. Kublai and Marco stare the wolf down, and Marco has to eventually shoot it when it attacks Kublai. This helps Marco's relationship with Kublai. Similarly, Kublai plans to stare down Kaidu's claim until it becomes too dangerous.
14	4	"Let God's Work Begin"	David Petrarca	Kate Barnow	July 1, 2016
Nayan is in Rome, along with Marco's father, to visit the Pope and discuss Kublai. The Pope sees Kublai's rule as a threat, in part because since he's accepting of so many religions, and vows to confront his forces should the Mongols move West. Nayan is less enthused about this idea, but when he proves his religious value to the Pope and the two agree to work together, he's swayed. He washes away his sins and prepares for battle. Meanwhile, the hunt is on for Jingim and Ahmad. Kaidu is pissed at his son because of his actions, which have brought Kublai to his doorstep. Together they all go out to search for the Khan's missing sons. Along the way, Kaidu and Kublai connect with memories of their childhood but also remain divided on the prospects of the Mongol empire. Things get particularly heated when the insults start flying and Kaidu pulls his sword on Kublai. Ultimately, nothing comes of the moment as Jingim and Ahmad are found. The other dangling plot thread is that of the Blue Princess and her potential pregnancy. Here she finds out that the stable boy who impregnated her has been killed, and when she goes to see the body for herself, she stumbles upon his wife and spends the day with her and her baby. It almost seems as if she'll abandon her position, especially if Jingim isn't found. Jingim is found after some bonding with Ahmad, who almost reveals his plans to overthrow the Khan. When Jingim returns, the Blue Princess greets him with the good news of her pregnancy.
15	5	"Lullaby"	Jon Amiel	Bruce Marshall Romans	July 1, 2016
Five rebels execute five different attacks and kill 300 Mongolians, as Ahmad informs the Khan. Kublai states that while he'll still travel to Xanadu to challenge Kaidu, he gives Ahmad control of his forces to strike back. Meanwhile, Khutulun makes it clear to Kaidu that she's not happy about being the heir because it would mean sacrificing her own goals. Byamba, who she's now separated from, is demoted to foot soldier by Ahmad, who's still working on his own plans to dethrone Kublai. Ahmad gains even more control when a guard tells him about the Empress leading a stableboy into Princess Kokachin's chambers. The situation is about to get even more complicated because the real Princess Kokachin shows up, apparently not dead like we all believed, and wants her life back. At the same time, Marco continues to grow suspicious of Ahmad, especially as he decides to send nearly 60,000 troops to battle the uprising and only 7,000 with Kublai to Xanadu. "Lullaby" also spends a bit of time filling in Ahmad's backstory. He was once simply a tax collector for the Khan, wanting to travel and learn about the people in Kublai's empire. He unknowingly has sex with his mother, a prostitute. When he realizes this, he kills her. This explains why he is secretly against Kublai. The Handmaiden and Hundred Eyes have a strange fight/dance showdown, Kublai is leaving for Xanadu with little protection and an uncertain meeting with Kaidu, and Ahmad is gaining more power.
16	6	"Serpent's Terms"	Jon Amiel	Noelle Valdivia	July 1, 2016
First, as the episode opens, we see Kaidu and his mother secretly finding their way to Cambulac. They arrive in the middle of the night shrouded in hoods. The purpose of their meeting in the capital is to discuss the overthrow of the Khan with Ahmad. The Khan's Vice Regent has made it clear that he wants Kublai gone, and he sees Kaidu as his own tool. In addition to Kaidu, he invites Nayan for the meeting, securing both of their opposition to Kublai. The offer of Mei Lin's daughter to the sinful Nayan helps to sway him. Meanwhile, Kublai is in Xanadu petitioning for votes and arguing for his vision of empirical expansion, complete with fireworks, to the people there. There are harbingers of death all around, though. Horses that were gifted to Kublai are attacked, found with their eyes carved out. Marco and Jingim believe it's the work of Kaidu, but Kublai doesn't seem worried. Eventually, after a night of passion with an exotic dancer who's traveled the world, the Blue Princess visits Marco and the mystery of the horses is solved. Under pressure from her pregnancy and guilt over her child and the dead stableboy, the impostor Blue Princess suffers a nervous breakdown; the real Blue Princess that had been demanding her life back was nothing more than her hallucination and it was the impostor Kokachin that had been gouging out the eyes of the Khan's horses. Marco points out to her the blood all over her hands. "Serpent's Terms" ends with Ahmad, Nayan, and Kaidu forming an alliance - one which Khutulun isn't happy about - while Kublai remains unaware. Byamba is off on his own following barrels of black powder that he believes will reveal something corrupt.
17	7	"Lost Crane"	Alik Sakharov	Matthew White	July 1, 2016
We see that Hundred Eyes and the Handmaiden, who he refers to as Lotus, were once friends and lovers. When the Mongolians attacked them, Hundred Eyes thought he saw Lotus die at the hands of an archer. The second attack is undertaken by Khutulun and Orus on the order of Kaidu. He's conducting murderous raids under the banner of Kublai, having his children and warriors wear masks to conceal their identities. Essentially he's framing Kublai in the hopes of drumming up support for his ascension to the throne. Meanwhile, the Blue Princess's visions threaten to reveal the true nature of the baby. Jingim is upset by his wife's condition. However, after Kublai finds out about Kaidu's attacks under his own banner, Jingim is ordered to ride East to engage in their own attacks. That's all part of Ahmad's grand scheme, though: send Jingim east to die while Nayan and Kaidu amass troops in the west. There's a twist that Ahmad doesn't expect: Mei Lin turns on him after he fails to deliver on his promise for her to see her daughter. That sends her to Marco, who gives her time with her daughter, and in return she tells him everything. Marco goes to the Khan and asks for his permission to head west even though he can't reveal why. He's asking for trust, and Kublai gives it. Byamba saves Marco and Jingim from two of Kaidu's men. Additionally, as Marco and Jingim ride West, they discover the gathering forces and one big surprise: Marco's father, Niccolò Polo.
18	8	"Whitehorse"	James McTeigue	Elizabeth Sarnoff & Patrick Macmanus	July 1, 2016
First, Ahmad lies to Kublai about Jingim's attacks in the East - Marco and Jingim are actually headed West - and when Mei Lin goes missing, Kublai questions his Vice Regent's connection to her. At the same time, Niccolò goes missing from Nayan's camp near the Twin Rivers, captured by Marco and Byamba. They spend the entirety of "Whitehorse" hiding in the woods, Marco questioning his father about where they will attack the Khan, and his father essentially calling him a traitor to his Christian people. For a while it looks like Marco has no choice but to kill his father, but a last-minute attack leaves the elder Polo's fate hanging in the balance. As for Mei Lin, she's escaped her entrapment with Ahmad, daughter in tow, and when Mongols attack her on the road, Lotus comes to her aid. That forces Mei Lin to accept that the Mongols will keep coming after her and her daughter until she ends this feud, so she leaves her daughter in the care of Lotus, the same woman who couldn't protect the boy emperor. Essentially, "Whitehorse" is about bringing the conflicts to the forefront before the season's climax. Kublai learns of Ahmad's betrayal when Jingim arrives home safe, and he's devastated, crying in his wife's arms when he realizes Ahmad tricked him into killing the boy emperor. With Nayan and Kaidu set on destroying Kublai, and Kublai realizing it now that Ahmad's been outed, the forces are set to collide in the final two episodes of the season. And Marco's caught in the middle.
19	9	"Heirs"	James McTeigue	Kate Barnow	July 1, 2016
"Heirs" begins with the Khan's force's attack on Nayan and Kaidu's camp. Borrowing an unconventional battle tactic from his grandfather Genghis, the Khan lights all of his white horses on fire and sends them charging through the enemy camp. This ingnites their black powder, which rips through the stronghold. Moments before the Khan's cavalry charge into the camp, Niccolò orders Kaidu to escape to Karakorum in order to preserve their plan of dethroning the Khan at the Kurultai. After some hesitance, Kaidu relents. During the melee, Byamba and Marco fight side by side. Hundred Eyes encounters a knight in chain mail, whom he dispatches with a well-placed jab to the neck. Khutulun and Orus face Jingim but she leaves to save Byamba from a rebel. This allows Jingim to overpower Orus and bash his skull in with a rock. Marco intervenes and saves his father from the Khan's men, allowing him to escape, which the Khan sees from a distance and once again sows doubt about Marco's loyalty in the Khan's mind. When the battle is over, Nayan is crucified and the Khan must reckon with the fact that Ahmad has betrayed him. Ahmad is holed up in Cambulac under the false pretense of the Khan's orders. The Khan also feels betrayed by Marco. The arrival of Jingim's heir - or "Heirs," as the Blue Princess gives birth to both a girl and a boy - should bring some joy to the lives of the Khan and his people, but it's clear there's more darkness on the horizon. Marco is banished from the tent, but only after the Blue Princess whispers her secret to him, and Kublai heads toward a vote that will impact his empire and legacy.
20	10	"The Fellowship"	Alik Sakharov	Elizabeth Sarnoff & Patrick Macmanus	July 1, 2016
At Karakorum, Kublai and Kaidu await the outcome of the Kurultai. Ahmad sits on the Khan's throne in Cambulac. The episode also foreshadows the plot of the show's third season with the arrival of a new adversary: Prester John. Two storylines make up "The Fellowship." The first involves the cases both Kaidu and the Khan give at the Kurultai as to why they should earn the Mongolian noblemen's votes in order to be selected as the Khan of Khans. It looks as if the vote is all but settled, with the people siding with Kublai and protesting Kaidu's aggressive tactics. The Kurultai doesn't go down without a hitch. Ahmad, backed into a corner by the presence of Jingim, Byamba, and Hundred Eyes, sends word to Kaidu revealing the truth about Jingim's son and Kublai's heir. Kaidu uses that knowledge to blackmail the Khan and the Empress, but they're more determined than Kaidu gives them credit for. First, the Empress helps the Blue Princess drown herself, and Kublai attempts to poison Kaidu, hoping to stop the potential leak of the information. Kaidu gets the upper hand, though, and is moments away from killing Kublai when Marco saves him. He has come back from his banishment to inform the Khan about Prester John's approaching Christian army. He kills Kaidu, thereby proving his loyalty to Kublai in the process. Back at Cambulac, Jingim, Hundred Eyes, and Byamba expertly pull off a raid that sees them take back control of the capital as Ahmad runs and hides. Unfortunately for him, Mei Lin is waiting for him in his room. She kills him and, in return, Jingim allows her to leave the capital freely, with Hundred Eyes offering to escort her back to her daughter. Thus, "The Fellowship" re-establishes Kublai as the Khan of Khans, and Ahmad, Kaidu, and the Blue Princess are dead. Ahmad hangs from the entrance to Cambulac, though, things aren't exactly peaceful. As the episode cuts to black, Byamba and Jingim look out at the empty camp where the Kurultai was meant to be held. The camera focuses in on a bloodied cross. Kublai may be back in control, but Prester John and his Crusader army are moving East.

== Reception ==
The first season of Marco Polo received mixed to negative reviews from critics. On Rotten Tomatoes, the first season has a rating of 33%, based on 45 reviews, with an average rating of 4.79/10. The site's critical consensus reads, "An all-around disappointment, Marco Polo is less entertaining than a round of the game that shares its name." On Metacritic, the show's first season has a score of 48 out of 100 based on reviews from 22 critics, indicating "mixed or average reviews".

In his review for Entertainment Weekly, Jeff Jensen gave the first season a "B−" rating, calling the premise "stale", but added "Somewhere in the middle of episode 2, though, Marco Polo becomes surprisingly watchable. The filmmaking becomes bolder." Writing for People, Tom Gliatto praised the series, calling it "... a fun, body-flinging, old-fashioned epic". USA Today reviewer Robert Bianco gave the series 1 1/2 stars out of 4, saying, "Clearly what Netflix hopes you'll see a [sic] big-bucks, prestige entertainment along the lines of that HBO fantasy epic, but in truth, Marco is far closer to one of those cheesy international syndicated adventures."

The second season was met with more positive reviews. On Rotten Tomatoes, it holds a rating of 100%, based on 6 reviews, with a rating average of 7.2/10.

In 2015, the President of Mongolia, Tsakhiagiin Elbegdorj, presented John Fusco and the Marco Polo creative team with an award, honoring their positive portrayal and global presentation of Mongolian subject matter. Fusco himself has described the series as historical fiction based on the accounts of the Italian traveler Marco Polo.

=== Accolades ===
Year	Award	Category	Nominee(s)	Result	Ref.
2015	Primetime Emmy Awards	Outstanding Original Main Title Theme Music	Daniele Luppi	Nominated	
2015	Hollywood Music in Media Awards	Best Main Title – TV Show/Digital Series	Daniele Luppi	Nominated	
2015	Golden Trailer Awards	Best Trailer/Teaser for a TV Series/Mini-Series	Aspect	Nominated	
2015	Australian Production Design Guild Awards	Set Decoration on a Television Drama	Christian Petersen	Won	
2015	SXSW Film Festival	Excellence in Title Design	Nominees: Ben Smith; Bryce Wymer	Nominated	
2016	American Society of Cinematographers Awards	Outstanding Achievement in Cinematography in Regular Series	Vanja Cernjul	Won	
2016	American Society of Cinematographers Awards	Outstanding Achievement in Cinematography in Television Movie/Mini-Series/Pilot	Romain Lacourbas	Nominated	
2017	Golden Reel Awards	Best Sound Editing – Short Form Sound Effects and Foley in Television	Nominees: Dave Paterson; Rachel Chancey; Glenfield Payne; Damian Volpe	Nominated	

== See also ==
- Europeans in Medieval China
- Mongol conquest of the Song dynasty
- History of the Song dynasty
