= Ochirtu Khan =

Khan of the Khoshut Khanate

Ochirtu Khan Очирт Хаан
- Setsen Khan; Protector-ruler of Tibet; Setsen Tayiji
- Coronation: 1666
- Born: Unknown
- Died: 1680; Bortala, China
- Spouse: Puntsugrolma; Dorji-Rabtan; Solmon; Üde-Agas
- Issue: Erdeni Khong Tayiji; Galdamba Batur; Yalguulsan Khutughtu
- House: Borjigin
- Dynasty: Khoshut Khanate
- Father: Baibaghas
- Mother: Gunju Khatun
- Religion: Tibetan Buddhism

Ochirtu Setsen Khan (died 1676 or 1677) was a prominent leader of the Khoshut tribe and a ruler of the Four Oirats Confederation. He was the eldest son of Khoshut's Baibaghas Batur Khan and his consort, as well as a nephew of Güshi Khan. From 1637 to 1676, he led the Four Oirats, initially holding the title of Setsen Tayiji (1637–1666). In 1666, he was granted the title of Khan by the Dalai Lama, after which he ruled as Ochirtu Setsen Khan.

== Overview ==
Ochirtu Setsen Khan's political activities began in 1637 after the Oirat military forces defeated and eliminated Choghtu Khong Tayiji of the Khalkha in the Qinghai region. In 1640, he participated in a gathering of 28 Khalkha and Oirat nobles and religious figures in the Tarbagatai Mountains, where they ratified the Great Code of Forty and Four to unite against foreign threats.

Between 1645 and 1646, a conflict arose between Ochirtu Setsen Khan and his younger brother, Ablai Taishi, over wealth, subjects, and pasturelands. The war involved Erdeni Batur Khong Tayiji on Ochirtu Setsen Khan’s side and Ablai Taishi and Köndölön Ubashi on the opposing side. Despite Ochirtu Setsen Khan’s faction emerging victorious, the struggle caused internal divisions among the Four Oirats. His son Galdamba Batur and the Buddhist scholar Zaya Pandita attempted to mediate peace.

Following Zaya Pandita’s death, Ochirtu Setsen Khan personally traveled to Lhasa to request the recognition of his reincarnation and bring him back to Oirat lands. However, the 5th Dalai Lama denied the request but instead granted Ochirtu Setsen Khan the title of "Khan," solidifying his authority. From that point onward, he was known as Ochirtu Setsen Khan.

In 1671, after the death of Sengge, his younger brother Galdan Boshugtu Khan returned from Tibet to claim the title of Khong Tayiji. Ochirtu Setsen Khan supported him and further strengthened ties by marrying his granddaughter, Anu-Dara, to Galdan.

In the summer of 1674, Ochirtu Setsen Khan launched a military campaign but refrained from attacking Galdan Boshugtu Khan directly. Instead, he retrieved people who had defected to Galdan. This deepened their conflict, culminating in 1676 when Galdan Boshugtu Khan attacked and defeated Ochirtu Setsen Khan, bringing him under his control. This victory marked the foundation of the Dzungar Khanate.

Ochirtu Setsen Khan died in 1680 while residing in Bortala, near the Bij River.

== Family ==
Father: Baibaghas Batur

Mother: Gunju Khatun

Wives: Puntsugrolma, Dorji-Rabtan, Solmon, Üde-Agas

Children: Erdeni Khong Tayiji, Galdamba Batur, Yalguulsan Khutughtu.
