= Battle of Jao Modo =

1696 battle near Ulaanbaatar, Mongolia

Battle of Jao Modo (Zuunmod)
- Part of Dzungar–Qing War
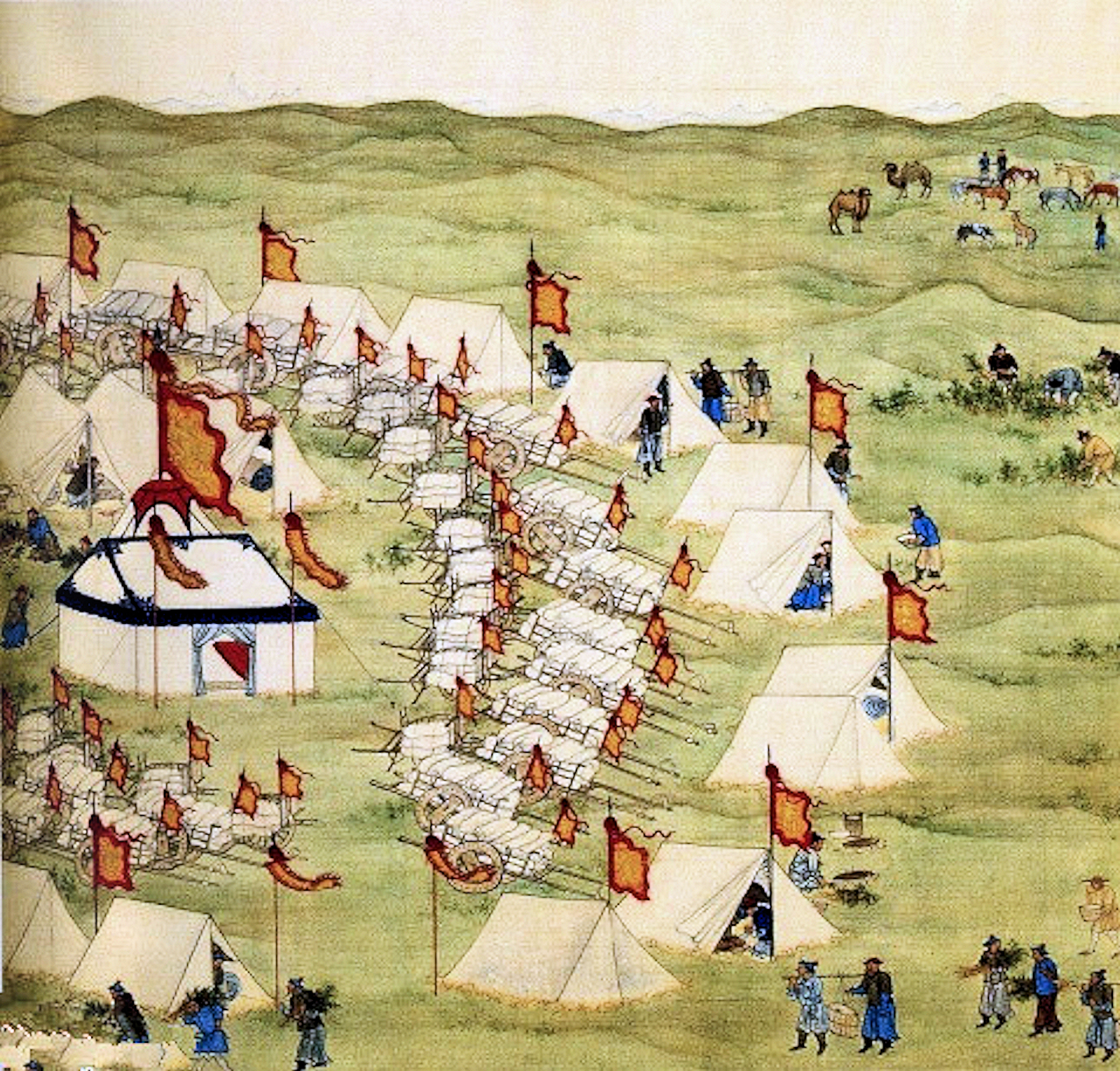
- Kangxi Emperor en route to attack the Dzungar Khan, Galdan Boshugtu Khan, in 1696..
Date	12 June 1696
Location	Zuunmod, southwest of Ulaanbaatar, modern-day Mongolia
Result	Qing victory

Belligerents
Qing dynasty	Dzungar Khanate

Commanders and leaders
(Qing dynasty) Kangxi Emperor (Qing dynasty) Sun Sike (Sun Ssu-k'o)	(Dzungar Khanate) Galdan Boshugtu Khan (Dzungar Khanate) Queen Anu †

Strength
50,000	30,000

Casualties and losses
2,000	8,000

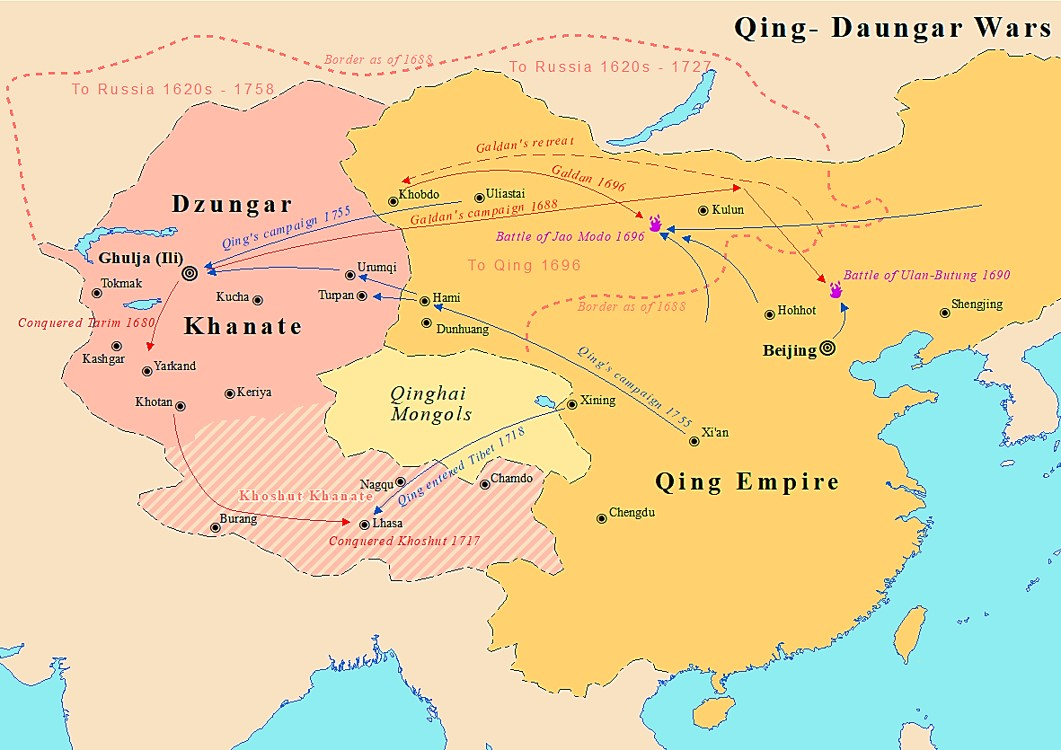
Map showing the Dzungar-Qing wars with the location of Jao Modo

The Battle of Jao Modo (Mongolian: Зуунмод-Тэрэлжийн тулалдаан; Chinese: 昭莫多之戰; pinyin: zhāo mò duō zhī zhàn) also known as the Battle of Zuunmod (literally "Battle of the Hundred Trees"), was fought on June 12, 1696, on the banks of the upper Terelj river 60 kilometres (37 mi) east of the modern-day Mongolian capital Ulaanbaatar. A Dzungar-Mongol army under the command of Galdan Boshugtu Khan was defeated by Qing armies personally led by the Kangxi Emperor. This decisive Qing victory in the early stages of the Dzungar–Qing Wars (1687–1758) effectively incorporated Khalkha Mongolia under Qing rule and relegated Dzungar Mongol forces to Inner Asia until they were finally defeated in 1758.

== Background ==
Attempts by the Qing court to maintain an uneasy peace between the eastern Khalkha and western Dzungar-Oirat Mongols ultimately collapsed when in 1687 forces loyal to the Khalkha Tüsheet Khan killed the brother of the Dzungar Mongol leader Galdan Boshugtu Khan in battle as he attempted to support the rival Zasaghtu Khalkha tribe. In defiance of orders from the Kangxi Emperor and the 5th Dalai Lama, Galdan swept eastward into Khalka territory in 1688, forcing the Khalkha Buddhist spiritual leader, Jebtsundamba Khutuktu Zanabazar and nearly 20,000 Khalkha refugees to flee south into present day Inner Mongolia and seek the protection of the Kangxi Emperor.

Motivated by the threat posed by a strong, unified Mongol state under Dzungar rule, the Kangxi Emperor began preparations to defeat Galdan. After the Qing successfully lured Galdan's forces closer to Beijing with promises of negotiating a peace treaty, Khalkha troops supported by the Qing army ambushed them in September 1690 at the Battle of Ulan Butung, 350 kilometers directly north of Beijing near the western headwaters of the Liao River. Galdan managed to escape to the upper Kherlen River, about 1,000 kilometres (620 mi) northwest of Beijing, where he and his army encamped for the next six years. In 1691, the three Khalkha rulers declared themselves Qing vassals at Dolon Nor, ending the last remnants of the Yuan dynasty and allowing the Qing to assume the mantle of the Genghisid khans and merge the Khalkha forces into the Qing army.

Almost immediately, the Qing set about preparing the complex logistics necessary to support a planned 1696 expedition. This included procuring 1,333 carts, each carrying six dan of grain. In March 1696, the Kangxi Emperor departed Beijing, personally leading 80,000 Eight Banner and Green Standard Army troops and 235 cannon on camel back on an 80-day trek northwest across the Gobi Desert to confront Galdan. A second army was under the command of Fiyanggu, numbering 30,000 and to be reinforced with a further 10,000, was to trap Galdan, while a third, numbering 10,000, halted further to the east and would play no major part in the campaign.

== Battle ==
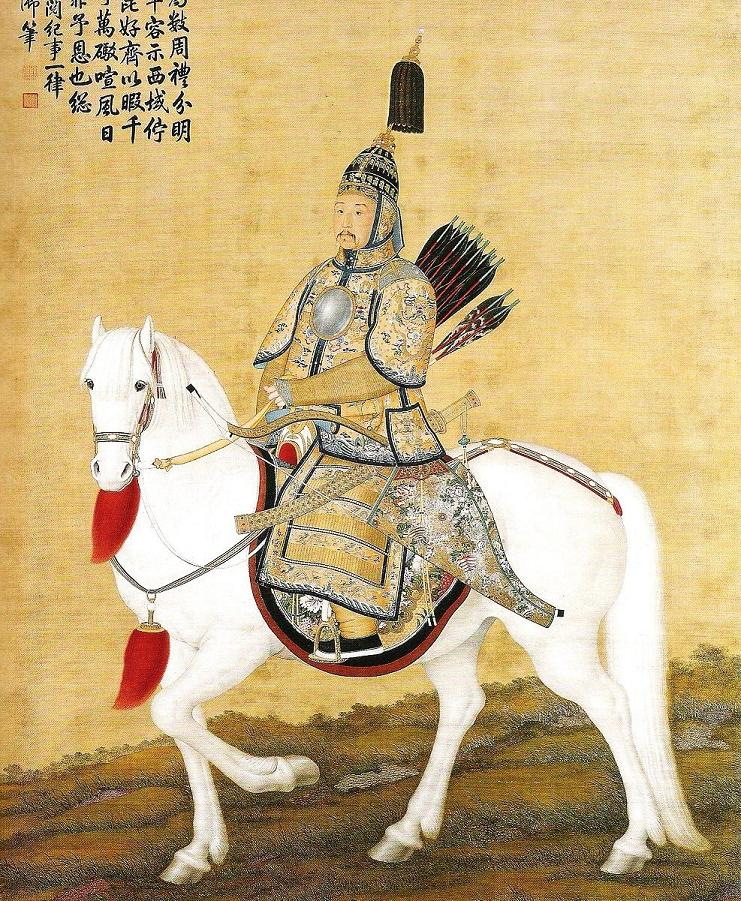
Armoured Kangxi Emperor

The Kangxi Emperor reached the Kherlen river on June 7, discovered Galdan had fled, and was forced to turn back due to dwindling supplies. On June 12, 1696, 5000 of Galdan's troops blundered into the Fiyanggu's western army at the upper Terelj river. Trapped between the Emperor's two armies, the Dzungars had little choice but to fight. The terrain consisted of a small valley with the Terelj at the bottom surrounded by hills. Banner soldiers from Xi'an and Green Standard soldiers from Gansu and Shaanxi formed the center, under the command of Sun Sike. Manchu and Mongol cavalry formed the flanks.

Fighting off sharp shooters, Qing troops successfully seized the surrounding hills and gained a strategic position. They bombarded Dzungar troops with their cannons and then advanced behind a wooden barricade. At noon, Galdan ordered all his troops to the center of the Qing advance, hoping to break their army. Although the Qing ordered dismounted cavalry into the fight, their center began to collapse. Suddenly, a detachment of Manchu cavalry hit the Dzungar camp from behind, capturing their supplies. As the Dzungars wavered, the Qing launched a massive counterattack supported by artillery. Galdan lost control of his troops, many of whom broke ranks and fled. Once encircled, the Dzungars were destroyed. Galdan's wife, Anu was killed by Qing artillery as she led a counterattack which enabled her husband to escape. Defeated, Galdan fled west to the Altai mountains with his remaining guard of 40 or 50 men but died of disease on April 4, 1697, near Khovd.

== Aftermath ==
The Kangxi Emperor's victory at Jao Modo represented the first time the Qing military had successfully tamed warring tribes at its frontier. At the same time it ended Galdan's dreams of reviving a pan-Mongolian central Asian empire. Much of modern-day Mongolia fell under Qing dynasty control where it would remain for the next 200 years. Although Galdan had been defeated, the Dzungars were pushed to the western edges of the Qing dynasty where successive emperors would use Mongol allies, including Galdan's nephew Tsewang Rabtan, a long-time anti-Galdan Oirat chief who succeeded Galdan as the new Dzungar khan, to contain them until their ultimate defeat at the battles of Oroi-Jalatu and Khurungun in 1758. It's also been said that Kangxi Emperor was deeply saddened about the escape of Galdan Boshugtu Khan and issued proclamation that whoever brings Galdan's head will be rewarded with one Tael of meat with one Tael of money and one Tael of bone with one Tael of gold. Queen Anu was also injured and died in the battle.
