= Kaidu =

Leader of the House of Ögedei

Kaidu ᠬᠠᠢ᠌ᠳᠤ
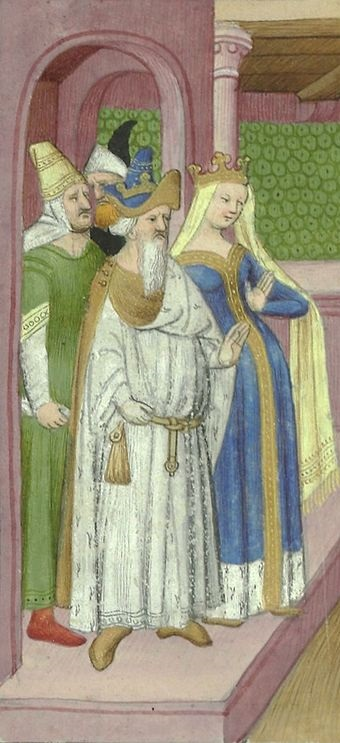
- Kaidu, The Travels of Marco Polo translated by Henry Yule (c. 1410/1412)
- Born: c. 1235
- Died: 1301 (aged 65–66); Karakorum, Yuan China
- Issue: Orus; Chapar; Khutulun; Sarban; Yangichar
- Dynasty: House of Ögedei
- Father: Khashin (Qashi)
- Mother: Sebkine Khatun
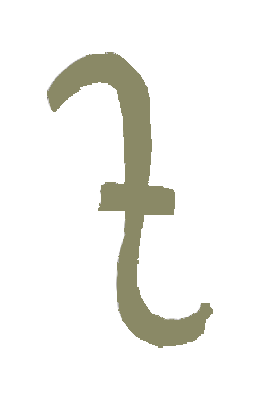
- Tamga

Kaidu (/ˈkaɪdu/; Middle Mongol: ᠬᠠᠢ᠌ᠳᠤ [ˈqʰaɪd̥ʊ], Modern Mongol: Хайду, Khaidu [ˈχæːtʊ̽]; c. 1235 – 1301) was a grandson of Ögedei Khan (1186–1241) and thus leader of the House of Ögedei and the de facto khan of the Chagatai Khanate, a division of the Mongol Empire. He ruled parts of modern-day Xinjiang and Central Asia during the 13th century, and actively opposed his cousin, Kublai, who established the Yuan dynasty. Medieval chroniclers often mistranslated Kadan as Kaidu, mistakenly placing Kaidu at the Battle of Legnica. Kadan was the brother of Güyük, and Kaidu's uncle.

== Early life ==
Kaidu was born in c. 1235 during the reign of his grandfather, the Great Khan Ögedei. Kaidu was the posthumous son of the Mongol Prince Kashin, who was himself the 4th son of Ögedei and his chief consort, the Great Khatun Töregene, and thus a vital part of the House of Ögedei even in his early childhood. His mother was Sebkine Khatun from the Bekrin (Mekrin) tribe of mountaineers, who were "neither Mongols, nor Uighurs". During Kaidu's early years, his grandfather, the Great Khan Ögedei, would die in 1241: leading to his grandmother Töregene becoming regent and thus the de-facto ruler of the Mongol Empire until 1246 when Kaidu's uncle Güyük Khan was elected as Great Khan. Güyük himself would rule the Mongol Empire till his own death in 1248 after merely two years on the throne, and his widow Oghul Qaimish would serve as regent until the election of the next Great Khan, a Toluid named Möngke Khan in 1251.

Following the Toluid accession to the throne of the Great Khans after his aunt's tenure as regent came to a violent end, Kaidu, now around 16 years old, was among the few favored Ögedeid princes in the eyes of the new Toluid regime. As such, Kaidu was invested with Qayaliq (now Qoylık southeast of Lake Balkhash in southeastern Kazakhstan) by Möngke Khan in 1252. Although not a particularly great appanage, Qayaliq is described as a prosperous city with busy markets, churches, and temples by William of Rubruck, who passed through in 1253. In 1260, Marco Polo described Yarkand, part of the area under Kaidu as "five days' journey in extent"; that its inhabitants were mostly Muslim although there were also some Nestorian and Jacobite Assyrians; and that it had plenty of food and other necessities, "especially cotton." Nevertheless, despite benefiting from the favor of Möngke, Kaidu arrested the khan's envoy, the judge Shi Tianlin, in 1256, and held him prisoner for twenty years. In the Toluid Civil War between 1260 and 1264, when Möngke's brothers Kublai Khan and Ariq Böke, who was proclaimed Great Khan at Karakorum, disputed the throne, Kaidu is said to have supported Ariq Böke. This is not entirely certain, as Kublai still apportioned a share of the profits of new conquests in China to Kaidu as late as 1265. At any rate, excluded from Kublai's partition of the Mongol territories among the princes, Kaidu would enter into protracted conflict with Kublai and his Ilkhanid allies. With the Chagatayid Khan Alghu supporting Kublai as great khan and ravaging Kaidu's lands, the latter made an alliance with Berke, the ruler of the Golden Horde, another division of the Mongol Empire following Möngke Khan's demise.

== Conquest of Transoxiana ==
After the defeat of Ariq Böke in 1264, Kublai summoned Kaidu to his court, possibly to discuss the future of the empire and give Kaidu his share of the Ögedeid appanage in China. But Kaidu avoided appearing at his court and said that his horses were too thin to bear long-distance travel. Because Genghis Khan had made a law that all branches of the family had to approve the granting of the title of Great Khan, Kaidu's enmity or non-cooperation was a constant obstacle to Kublai's ambitions.

In 1266 Baraq was dispatched to Central Asia to take the throne of Chagatai. Kublai instigated Baraq to attack Kaidu in 1268. At first Baraq defeated Kaidu, however, subsequently, Kaidu defeated Baraq with the assistance of Berke's successor Möngke-Temür. When Baraq advanced towards Kaidu, the latter set a trap for the invader's troops on the bank of the Jaxartes, and defeated his forces. Transoxiana was then ravaged by Kaidu. Baraq fled to Samarkand, then Bukhara, plundering the cities along the way in an attempt to rebuild his army. These actions alarmed Kaidu, who did not want the region to be further devastated. Kaidu also needed to free up his army for a potential conflict with Kublai. Peace was therefore proposed, and Baraq was pressured by the governors of the sedentary areas of the khanate, Mas'ud Beg and Daifu, to accept. He did, and peace was declared at a kurultai, although sources disagree on the time and location. Rashid al-Din claims that the meeting took place in the spring of 1269 in Talas (then called Yangi), while Wassaf writes that it took place around 1267 to the south of Samarkand. Either way, two-thirds of Transoxiana were granted to Baraq, while the other third went to Kaidu and Möngke-Temür. Kaidu also gained control of the region around Bukhara. Neither side gained control of the cities; the administration of these instead devolved to Mas'ud Beg, while Baraq and Kaidu agreed to reside only in the deserts and mountains.

== Zenith of Kaidu's power ==
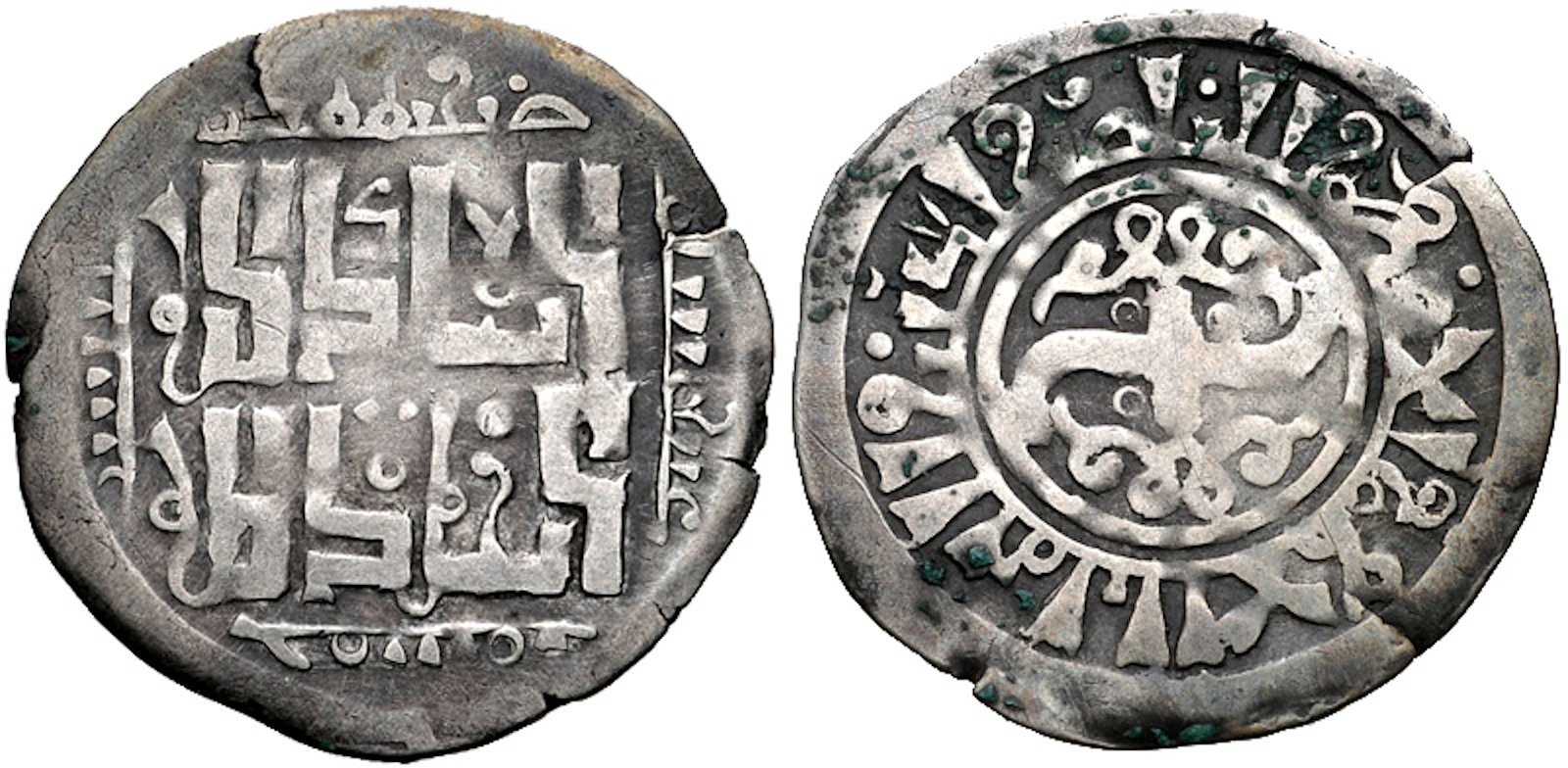
Ögedeids coinage of the time of Qaidu. AH 668-701 AD 1269-1302 Otrar mint. Dated AH 685 (AD 1286).

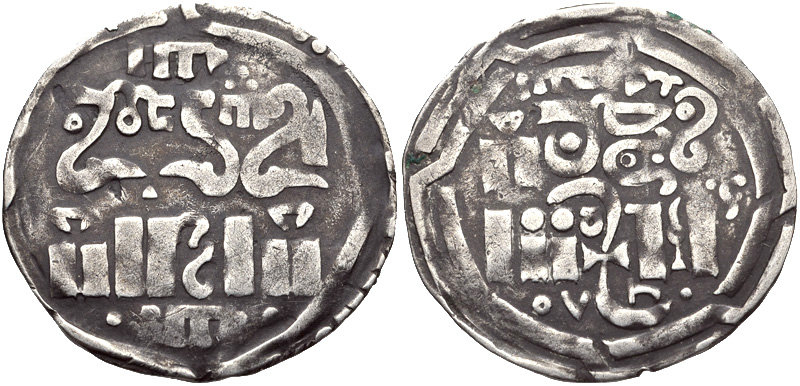
Chaghatayid Khans. temp. Qaidu. Circa AH 668-701 AD 1268-1301. Samarqand mint. Dated AH 685 (AD 1285)

Seeking to rid himself of Baraq, Kaidu encouraged him to attack Ilkhanid Persia. Following some initial success, Baraq suffered a serious defeat at Herat on July 22, 1270 at the hands of the Ilkhan Abaqa, after having been abandoned by Kaidu's troops and Kaidu had advised Abaqa accordingly. Defeated and wounded, Baraq sought Kaidu's help, who reassured him but prepared to encircle and eliminate him. Baraq died before the attack, in August 1271. The Chagatayid princes, including Alghu's sons and Baraq's predecessor Mubarak Shah, submitted to Kaidu, who was invested as ruler of the previously dispersed Ulus of Ögedei at a kurultai at Talas in August/September 1271. Despite this success, Kaidu did eventually encounter opposition: the sons of Alghu and Baraq rebelled in the west and caused much damage, although Kaidu defeated them in the end. Some of the rebels fled to the Ilkhanate, from which they could raid into Kaidu's territory, while others recognized the supremacy of Kublai. Kaidu's early attempt to rule the Chagatayids faced other resistance, even from Negübei, whom Kaidu himself had appointed khan of the Ulus of Chagatai as Baraq's successor in 1271. Kaidu defeated the challenge and Negübei fled, only to be murdered by a cousin, Buqa Temür, in 1272. Kaidu now rewarded Buqa Temür by making him khan of the Ulus of Chagatai. The new khan was no threat to Kaidu, in part because of his physical feebleness, but that also meant that he could not ensure stability in the Ulus by curtailing the attacks of the rebels. Greater stability ensued only after Kaidu appointed Baraq's able and cooperative son Duwa the new khan of the Ulus of Chagatai in 1282.

In 1268, Kaidu had been defeated by the forces of the great khan Kublai in the area of Almaliq, and was forced to regroup in the west, round Talas. To guard against Kaidu, Kublai posted his son Nomukhan and other loyal princes to the region in 1271. The successes of Kublai's general An Tong gave Kaidu pause (or at least he pretended to consider the great khan's demands), but in the end he refused to submit. However, in 1276 a group of princes rebelled, seeking to make Möngke's son Shiregi great khan, and captured Nomukhan, his brother Kököchü, and their general An Tong. Kublai's two sons were then sent off to Möngke Temür in the west, while the general was handed over to Kaidu. Nevertheless, prioritizing his troubles in the west, Kaidu refused to support the rebel princes. They managed to seize Karakorum in 1277, but were quickly driven west of the Altai Mountains by Kublai's generals. The conflict continued until 1282, when the rebels acknowledged defeat; some submitted to the great khan, while others sought refuge with Kaidu.

Kaidu benefited from the princes' revolt against Kublai, as it left him free to deal with opposition from within the Ulus of Chaghatai. Having solidified his position in the west, he was also able to recover control over Almaliq in the east, and further enhanced his military capabilities by the absorption of the forces of the rebel princes who surrendered to him. For his part, Kublai struck back with economic reprisals and ensconced his forces at Beshbaliq from 1278, and proceeded to establish a chain of postal stations and military colonies in Uighuria and along the edge of the Tarim Basin. However, by now Kaidu was stronger than before, and he and his underlings (including the Chagatayid khan Duwa) raided across Kublai's line of stations from 1280. After varied success, Kaidu and Duwa were able to take over Beshbaliq in 1286, forcing Kublai's troops to evacuate Uighuria and the Tarim Basin over the following years. From his newly gained lands, Kaidu could threaten areas within Kublai's area of control, like Qumul and Tibet.

When Nayan rebelled against Kublai in Manchuria in 1287 as head of a coalition of the descendants of Chinggis Khan's brothers, he sought Kaidu's support. Unlike his earlier refusal to support the rebel princes against Kublai, this time Kaidu agreed. Nevertheless, Kublai acted quickly, and was able to defeat, capture, and execute Nayan before the latter could join forces with Kaidu. Undaunted, Kaidu exploited Kublai's preoccupation in Manchuria to raid into northwestern Mongolia proper in 1288, defeating Kublai's grandson Kammala and capturing the old capital Karakorum in 1289. When Kublai himself advanced on Kaidu, however, Kaidu retreated. Kublai's commander Bayan was now stationed in the region, with the aim of expelling any remaining forces of Kaidu's and repulsing future attacks.

== Later defeats and death ==
Kaidu's brief occupation of Karakorum can be seen as the culmination of his success. His retreat, however, was quickly followed by reverses at the hands of Kublai's commanders, especially Bayan (who defeated Ariq Böke's son Melik Temür in 1292) and Tuq Tuqa (who carried operations west of the Altai mountains and captured three thousand of Kaidu's men in 1293). Tuq Tuqa's successes are credited with discouraging Kaidu from trying to take advantage of Kublai's death in 1294. The new great khan, Temür, Öljeitü Khan (1294–1307), abandoned Kublai's distracting ambitions towards Japan and Southeast Asia, and was therefore able to devote more substantial military forces to the campaign against Kaidu. Despite this resurgence, Kaidu and Duwa were able to minimize or even reverse any temporary losses.

After considering a potential coalition against Kaidu and Duwa with the Ilkhan and Bayan of Eastern Qipchaq, the great khan Temür left operations against them to his brother Kammala and nephew Qayishan. Following Duwa's success in a surprise attack in late 1298 (in which Temür's brother-in-law Körküz was captured), Temür adopted a more aggressive policy, and organized a major campaign against Kaidu and his allies. The attack came in 1300, with Qayishan defeating Kaidu and advancing west of the Altai Mountains. Determined to fight again, Kaidu ordered Duwa to join with him, but Duwa initially refused to come, citing the exhaustion and poor health of his troops and herds. Although badly outnumbered and still delaying in the hope of receiving aid from Duwa, Kaidu was forced to make his stand south of the Altai Range, at Mount Tiejiangu, on 3 September 1301. Here, Kaidu was wounded and suffered a serious defeat; only a ruse, lighting numerous camp fires during the night following the battle saved him from pursuit, as the enemy assumed he had received large reinforcements. Eventually, Duwa did come with reinforcements and at a follow-up battle a little farther to the west, at the presently unidentified Qaraqada, Kaidu and Duwa scored some success, although Qayishan managed to relieve them of their booty and prisoners, while Duwa was wounded in a separate engagement. The final battle of the conflict was effectively a draw: both Qayshan and Kaidu had to retreat to their power bases after it. Kaidu had weathered the storm, for the time being; but his forces were badly battered, he himself had been wounded, and he died shortly afterwards, late in 1301.

Sometimes considered to have aimed at nothing less than the position of great khan, Kaidu seems to have been concerned with reestablishing the Ulus of Ögedei and asserting its control over that of Chagatai. His long-term opposition to the great khans allowed the emergence not only of an effectively independent Mongol state in Central Asia (ultimately to the benefit of the Chagatais), but also made possible the corresponding formation of other parts of the Mongol Empire as effectively independent khanates, in Qipchaq and Iran. Nevertheless, Kaidu's relationship with the other Mongol rulers, the great khans apart, was complex. He had asserted his domination over the Ulus of Chagatai by force, and only found significant cooperation, which lasted for two decades, once he installed Duwa as khan in 1282. The Ilkhanids, generally allied to the great khans Kublai and Temür, were usually Kaidu's rivals across a common frontier on or near the Oxus, although Kaidu found it convenient to connive with the Ilkhan Abaqa against Baraq in the early 1270s. By 1288, however, Kaidu was at war with the Ilkhan, raiding into Khurasan and supporting rebels against the Ilkhan there. The conflict continued until after Kaidu's death, his son Sarban invading Khurasan in 1302. The Jochid rulers of Qipchaq, the so-called Golden Horde, Berke and Möngke Temür, were instrumental in Kaidu's rise to power. Although he remained basically friendly, Möngke Temür later exhibited a degree of cooperation to the great khan, effectively adopting a neutral stance; his cousins Qonichi and Bayan, rulers of the eastern wing of the Golden Horde, on the other hand, were Kaidu's neighbors along the Jaxartes, and quickly became his rivals over territory and revenue. Accordingly, Kaidu and Duwa supported another of their kinsmen, Küilük, as rival ruler in the region. During the civil war between Toqta and Nogai, Kaidu enjoyed the friendship of Nogai, whose elimination in 1299 deprived him of a potential ally.

== Legacy ==
Kaidu had perhaps intended for his youngest son by his chief wife Dörbejin, Orus, to succeed him as ruler of the Ulus of Ögedei. The Chagatayid khan Duwa, however, secured the succession of Kaidu's elder son Chapar, either because of friendship, or because Chapar was deemed conveniently weak and pliable. Threatened by another coalition of neighboring Mongol rulers, Duwa and Chapar made peace with the great khan Temür in 1303–1304. Although Duwa had remained loyal to Kaidu until the end, he now sought to exploit his own seniority and position of power vis-a-vis Kaidu's heirs. Chapar fell out with Duwa by 1306, who outmaneuvered him militarily and diplomatically, and finally forced him to surrender by early 1307. Chapar was now retired and replaced by his brother Yangichar. Although Duwa himself died later in 1307 and the Ulus of Chagatai underwent a brief period of instability, Duwa had effectively reversed the situation of Kaidu's reign, largely eliminating the Ulus of Ögedei as a viable Mongol power. It was he and his descendants, who reaped the harvest of Kaidu's establishment of an autonomous Mongol polity in Central Asia. Kaidu's heirs were divided and marginalized, Yangichar and Chapar both submitting to Qayishan, now Külüg Khan (1307–1311) in 1310. Ögedeid princes entered the services of other rulers, and the Chagatai khans allowed the former Ögedeid powerbase in the northeast to pass under the rule of the great khans.

== Family ==
Kaidu (Qayidu) was the posthumous son of Qashi (by Sebkine Khatun), the 5th son of Ögedei Khan (and the 4th by his chief consort Töregene Khatun). The number of his children is reported variously, but only the following are known by name.

Sons:

- Chapar, who succeeded his father in 1301, but was deposed in 1307
- Yangichar, who succeeded his brother in 1307, but died in 1310
- Orus, who was possibly Kaidu's intended heir
- Ürük Temür
- Töde'en
- Il Buyan (or Īl Tūyār or El Nobar)
- ʿUmar Khwājah
- Qahawur (or Qudāwur or Töde'ür)
- Quril
- Sorqa Buqa (or ʿUrqā Tūqā)
- Yisün Buqa (or Eygü Buqa)
- Li Bakhshi (or Tai Bakhshi)
- Sarban
- Könchek
- Bariqi (or Dörji?)
- Shāh
- Köichi
- Burja Ebügen

Daughters:

- Qutulun Chaghan, married Abtaqul.
- Qutuchin Chaghan (or Qortochin Chakha), married Tübshin, the son of Tazai Güregen (who had married a niece of Kublai Khan).

Although Kaidu had many sons, he is said to have relied mostly on his daughter Qutulun for advice and aid in military matters.

== Cultural references ==
Kaidu is often portrayed in historical fiction or dramatic works. He was an antagonist in The Journeyer, a novel by Gary Jennings published in 1984. The character of Kaidu was portrayed by Rick Yune in the Netflix original series, Marco Polo (2015–2016).

Kaido is an antagonist in the series One Piece, "Kaido of the hundred beasts" which is said to be the strongest 'creature' in the One Piece world, Kaido resembles the Mongol warrior Kaidu, and he has a son named "Yamato" that is loosely inspired by the famous Khutulun.

== See also ==
- Kaidu–Kublai war
- Division of the Mongol Empire
