= Khutulun =

Mongolian princess (1260–1306)

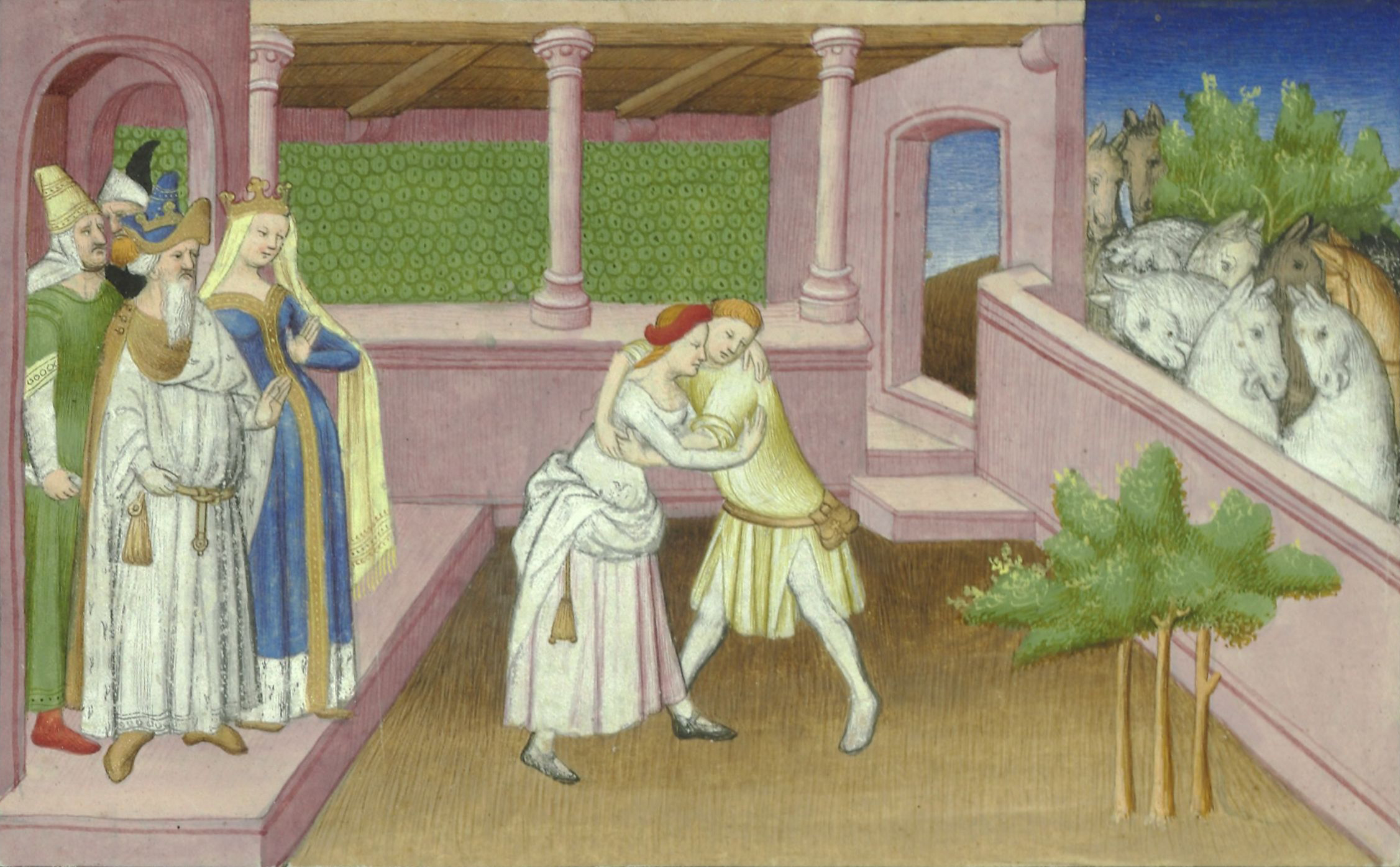
- Khutulun daughter of Qaidu, medieval miniatures, 1410–1412
- Full name: Aigiarne
- Native name: Aiyurug
- Born: Khotol Tsagaan; 1260
- Died: 1306 (aged 45–46)
- Family: Ogedai Dynasty
- Father: Kaidu

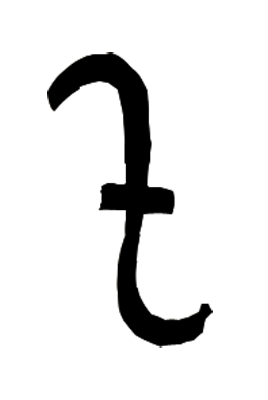
Tamgha of Kaidu, House of Ögedei.

Khutulun (c. 1260 – c. 1306), also known as Aigiarne, Aiyurug, Khotol Tsagaan or Ay Yaruq (lit. 'Moonlight') was a Mongol noblewoman and the daughter of Kaidu, a cousin of Kublai Khan. Both Marco Polo and Rashid al-Din Hamadani wrote accounts of their encounters with her.

== Life ==
Khutulun was born about 1260. By 1280, her father Kaidu became the most powerful ruler of Central Asia, reigning in the realms from western Mongolia to Oxus, and from the Central Siberian Plateau to India.

In historical chronicles, Khutulun was described as a strong warrior princess who participated in the Mongol military campaigns in Central Asia. She was trained in shooting, wrestling and riding since her childhood. Later, when she grew up, she became a skilled wrestler who defeated elite male warriors in traditional wrestling competitions. Khutulun was a hero, chronicled by many medieval authors, one of whom was Marco Polo.

Sources vary about her husband's identity. Some chronicles say her husband was a handsome man who failed to assassinate her father and was taken prisoner; others refer to him as Kaidu's companion from the Choros clan. Rashid al-Din wrote that Khutulun fell in love with Ghazan, Mongol ruler in Persia. Other chronicles say she never married and defeated every man who tried to fight her for a wedding, taking their horse after their defeat. She was rumored to have died with 10,000 horses to her name. Beyond Marco Polo's fanciful story, both Rashīd al-Dīn and Abū'l Qāsim Qāshānī give her husband's name, either Abtaqul or Itqul. Both he and Khutulun's two sons were drowned by relatives of Dua, the Chaghadaid ruler.

Of all Kaidu's children, Khutulun was the favorite, and the one from whom he most often sought advice and political support. According to some accounts, he tried to name her as his successor to the khanate before he died in 1301. However, his choice was refused as she had male relatives. Additionally, she allegedly rejected the offer, saying she was “desirous of leading the military and running affairs” and that she preferred her brother Orus to be heir.When Kaidu died, Khutulun guarded his tomb with the assistance of her brother Orus. She was challenged by her other brothers including Chapar and relative Duwa because she resisted their succession. She died in 1306.

== In popular culture ==
Khutulun is thought to be the basis for the character of Turandot, who has been the subject of a number of Western works. While in Mongol culture she is remembered as a famous athlete and warrior, in Western artistic adaptations she is depicted as a proud woman who finally succumbs to love.

François Pétis de la Croix's 1710 book of Asian tales and fables contains a story in which Khutulun is called Turandot, a Persian word (Turandokht توراندخت) meaning "Central Asian Daughter", and is the nineteen-year-old daughter of Altoun Khan, the Mongol emperor of China. In Pétis de La Croix's story, however, she does not wrestle her suitors, and they do not wager horses; rather, she has them answer three riddles, and they are executed if they cannot solve them.

Carlo Gozzi wrote his own version 50 years later, a stage play in which she was a "tigerish woman" of "unrelenting pride". Friedrich Schiller translated and adapted the play into German as Turandot, Prinzessin von China in 1801.

The most famous version of Turandot is Giacomo Puccini's unfinished operatic version, which he was working on when he died in 1924.

There are many stories and novels about Khutulun presented by Mongolian writers, such as Khotolon by Purev Sanj, Kaidu's wonderful daughter Khutulun by Ch.Janchivdorj, Khotol Tsagaan by Oyungerel Tsedevdamba, The Story of Kaidu Khan by Batjargal Sanjaa, and Princess Khutulun by B. Shuudertsetseg.

Khutulun is portrayed by Claudia Kim in the Netflix series Marco Polo.

Khutulun was the name chosen for a popular racehorse in Australia 2011–2019, which was bought by Grand Syndicates for just A$16,000 and eventually won nearly A$500,000 in prize money.

On 3 December 2021, Shuuder Productions and Voo Broadcasting released the film Princess Khutulun. The movie is based on the novel Khotol Tsagaan Gunj by Mongolian author Baatarsuren Shuudertsetseg and takes place during the Yuan Dynasty. Actress Tsedoo Munkhbat played the starring role. In 2024, the film was released as The Princess Warrior in the US as a streaming video title.
