= Galdan Boshugtu Khan =

Khan of the Dzungar Khanate

Галдан Бошигт Хаан Galdan Boshugtu Khan
- Boshugtu Khan
- Modern presentation of Galdan Boshugtu Khan (1644–1697), painting by D.Mishig, 1994. The original is displayed in Khovd province museum, Hovd city, Mongolia

Khan of the Dzungar Khanate
- Reign: 1671–1697
- Coronation: 1678
- Predecessor: Sengge
- Successor: Tsewang Rabtan
- Born: 1644
- Died: 3 May 1697 (aged 52–53); Acha Amttai, Khovd Province, Mongolia
- Consort: Queen Anu
Names
- Эрдэнийн Галдан
Regnal name
- Boshugtu Khan (ᠪᠤᠱᠤᠭᠲᠤ ᠬᠠᠭᠠᠨ)
- House: Choros
- Dynasty: Dzungar Khanate
- Father: Erdeni Batur
- Mother: Yum Agas
- Religion: Tibetan Buddhism

Galdan Boshugtu Khan (Note: Mongolian: Галдан бошигт хаан, romanized: Galdan boshigt khaan, pronounced [qáɬtəɴ pɔ́ɕɪxtʰ χáːɴ]; Classical Mongolian: ᠭᠠᠯᠳᠠᠨ ᠪᠤᠱᠤᠭᠲᠤ ᠬᠠᠭᠠᠨ; simplified Chinese: 噶尔丹; traditional Chinese: 噶爾丹; pinyin: Gárdān) (1644 – 3 May 1697) was a Choros-Oirat khan of the Dzungar Khanate. As fourth son of Erdeni Batur, founder of the Dzungar Khanate, Galdan was a descendant of Esen Taishi, the powerful Oirat Khan of the Northern Yuan dynasty who united all Mongols in the 15th century. Galdan's mother was a daughter of Güshi Khan, the first Khoshut-Oirat King of Tibet.

== Early years and consolidation of power ==
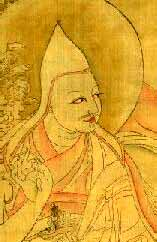
In his early years Galdan studied in Lhasa under the spiritual guidance of the 4th Panchen Lama and the Great 5th Dalai Lama

At the age of 7, Galdan was sent to Lhasa to be educated as a lama under the 5th Dalai Lama at Tashilhunpo Monastery. He spent 20 years studying Buddhist canons, philosophy, astronomy, astrology and basics of medicine and pharmacology. In this sense, he was one of the best educated kings in Mongolian history.

He backed his brother Sengge's claim to the title Khan of the Dzungars against the pretensions of their half-brothers Chechen Tayiji and Zotov Batur. With the support of Ochirtu Khan of the Khoshut, Sengge solidified his rule in 1661. Nevertheless, the two brothers never gave up their royal aspirations, and in 1670 Chechen Tayiji murdered Sengge in a family coup. When Galdan's mother Amin-Dara arrived to Lhasa to inform Galdan of Sengge's death, Galdan immediately renounced his status as a lama and quickly returned to the Irtysh Valley to avenge him. After soundly defeating Chechen Tayiji and Zotov Batur in 1671, the Dalai Lama named Galdan Khong Tayiji "Crown Prince".

After Sengge's death, Galdan took his widow Anu-Dara, granddaughter of Ochirtu, as his bride. Conflict within the family soon erupted again when Ochirtu, fearing Galdan's popularity, supported Galdan's uncle and rival Choqur Ubashi. In 1678 Galdan forced Ochirtu to flee to Kokonur and established hegemony over the Oirats. The following year, the Dalai Lama bestowed on him the highest title of Boshoghtu (or Boshughtu) Khan, or "Divine Khan".

== Altishahr and the Kazakhs ==
Imams of the Naqshbandi lineage had replaced the Chagatayid Khans in the early 17th century. After the defeat of the White Mountain Khoja, their exiled ruler Afaq Khoja approached the 5th Dalai Lama for military assistance in 1677. By the request of the latter, Galdan overthrew the Black Mountain Khoja in the Dzungar conquest of Altishahr and installed Afaq as his client ruler there. Galdan decreed that the Turkestanis would be judged by their own law except in cases affecting the Dzungar Khanate. The Dzungars kept control over the Tarim Basin until 1757.

In 1680 the Black Kyrgyz raided Moghulistan and occupied Yarkant. The inhabitants of Yarkant appealed to Galdan Khan for help. The Dzungars conquered Kashgar and Yarkant and Galdan had its ruler chosen by its inhabitants. Then he invaded the north of Tengeri Mountain in modern Kazakhstan the next year; he defeated Tauke Khan's Kazakhs but failed to take Sayram. He conquered Turfan and Hami the next year. In 1683 Galdan's armies under Rabtan reached Tashkent and the Syr Darya and crushed two armies of the Kazakhs. After that Galdan subjugated the Black Khirgizs and ravaged the Fergana Valley. From 1685 Galdan's forces aggressively pushed the Kazakhs. While his general Rabtan took Taraz, and his main force forced the Kazakhs to migrate westwards.

In 1687, he besieged Turkistan, an important pilgrimage center for the Muslim Kazakhs, but could not take it.

== Rivalry with Khalkha ==
At first the Khalkha and Oirat Mongols were allies, bound by the provisions of the Mongol-Oirat code. To cement this union, Galdan attempted to ally with Zasaghtu Khan Shira who lost part of his subjects to Tushiyetu Khan Chakhun Dorji, and moved his orda near the Altai Mountains. Tushiyetu Khan attacked the right wing of the Khalkhas and killed Shira in 1687. Galdan dispatched troops under his younger brother Dorji-jav against the Tushiyetu Khan the next year, but they were eventually defeated and Dorji-jav was killed in the ensuing battle. Chakhundorji murdered Degdeehei Mergen Ahai of the Zasaghtu Khan who was on the way to Galdan. The Qing court intervened and called all the Mongolian nobles to assemble a conference.

To avenge the death of his brother and expand his influence over other Mongol areas, Galdan prepared for war with the Khalkha of eastern Mongolia. Galdan established a friendly relationship with the Tsardom of Russia, which was at war with Tushiyetu Khan over territories near Lake Baikal in northern Khalkha. Bonded by a common interest in defeating the Khalkha, both Galdan and the Russians simultaneously attacked and conquered most of the territories of Khalkha. Armed with superior firearms provided by the Russians, Galdan attacked the land of the late Zasaghtu Khan, and advanced to the dominion of Tushiyetu Khan. The Russian Cossacks meanwhile attacked and defeated the Khalkha's contingent of 10,000 near Lake Baikal.. In 1688, after two bloody battles with the Dzungar in present-day central Mongolia, Erdene Zuu Monastery and Tomor, Tushiyetu Khan and his son Galdandorji fled to the Ongi River.

Acting in defiance of contrary orders from the Kangxi Emperor and the 5th Dalai Lama, he entered Khalkha territory in 1688. The Zunghars occupied the Khalkha homeland, and forced Jibzundamba Zanabazar to flee. The Qing court strengthened its northern border garrisons, and advised the Khalkhas to resist Galdan. After being reinforced by fresh troops, the Tushiyetu Khan Chakhundorji counterattacked the Zunghars, and fought with them near Olgoi Lake on August 3, 1688. The Oirats won after a 3-day battle. Galdan's conquest of Khalkha Mongolia made Zanabazar and Chakhundorji submit to the Qing dynasty in September.

== War with the Qing ==
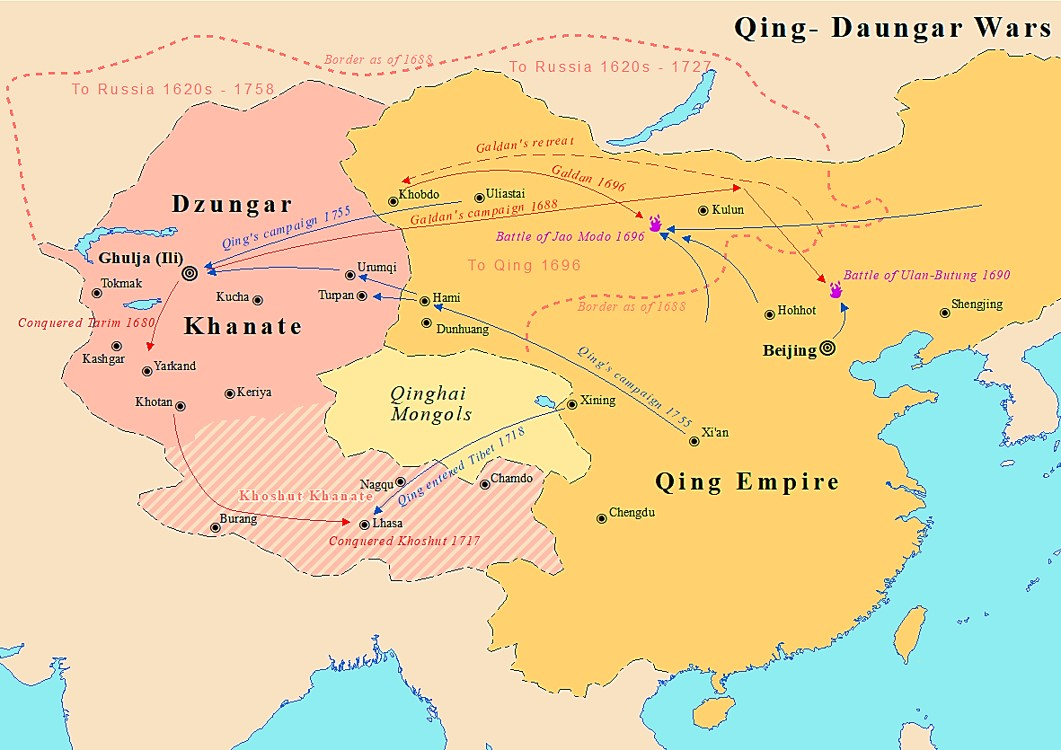
Map showing Dzungar-Qing wars with Galdan's campaigns

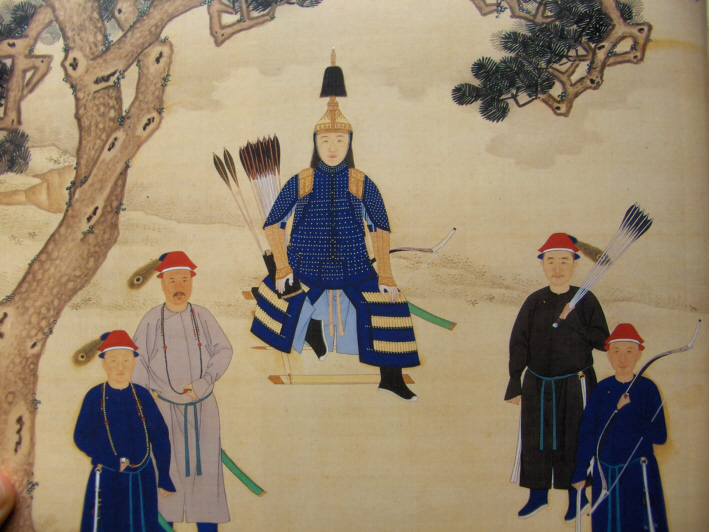
The Kangxi Emperor in ceremonial armor, armed with bow and arrows. The Qing emperor would be the most formidable enemy Galdan faced, and it would be Qing opposition that checked his ambition of uniting the Mongols under his standard

By his victory in 1688, Galdan had driven the Khalkhas into the arms of the Qing and made himself a military threat to the Manchus. Unfortunately for Galdan, the Kangxi Emperor was unusually vigorous and warlike. While he was fighting in Eastern Mongolia, his nephew Tsewang Rabtan seized the Dzungarian throne in 1689 and provided intelligence against Galdan to the Qing at several points during the war. After a series of successful battles in the Khangai Mountains, at Lake Olgoi and Ulahui River, he approached the Great Wall of China. The Khalkha leaders retreated to Inner Mongolia with their troops and the Khalkha territory fell under Galdan's rule. The Qing deceived him to arrive near Beijing saying that they needed a treaty, but ambushed him at the battle of Ulan Butung, which was fought 350 kilometers directly north of Beijing near the western headwaters of the Liao River at the southern end of the Greater Khingan. Galdan's troops were seriously defeated by the Khalkha troops supported by the Qing army and Galdan retreated back to Khalkha.

== Defeat and death ==
In 1696 Galdan was on the upper Kherlen River east of modern Ulaanbaatar. Kangxi's plan was to personally lead an army northwest to Galdan while sending a second army north from the Ordos Desert to block his escape. Kangxi reached the Kherlen, found Galdan gone, but was forced to turn back due to lack of supplies. On 12 June 1696, the same day Kangxi turned back, Galdan blundered into the western army and was disastrously defeated at Terelj's Zuunmod near the upper Tuul River east of Ulan Bator. Galdan's wife, Queen Anu, was killed during the battle and the Manchus captured 20,000 cattle and 40,000 sheep. Galdan fled with his remaining 40 or 50 men. He gathered a few thousand followers who later deserted due to hunger. Failing in his objectives of usurping the Khaan's throne of Mongolia and the dreams of achieving greatness and with nowhere to go but facing imminent threat of being captured by the Manchus or Tsewang Rabtan, he killed himself by taking poison on 4 April 1697 in the Altai Mountains near Khovd with only 300 of his followers staying with him. He was succeeded by Tsewang Rabtan who had revolted against him.

A son and a daughter of Galdan remained in Tsewang Rabtan's household along with a lama wanted by the Kangxi Emperor for desertion and for assisting Galdan. In 1698, Tsewang Rabtan was forced to deliver the three of them to Beijing along with Galdan's ashes, which were then scattered on the military parade ground in the city. Although the lama was executed, Kangxi spared the daughter and son, and Galdan's other son, Septen Bailsur, who had been in prison until this time. They were all pardoned and housed in Beijing where they died.

== Family ==
- Father: Erdeni Batur Khong Tayiji
- Mother: Yum Agas Khatun
- Siblings: Sengge Khong Tayiji
- Wife: Anu Khatun
- Sons: Sebteng Baljur
- Daughters: Zunchikhai, Boum

== In popular culture ==
- Galdan appears as a minor character in the wuxia novel The Deer and the Cauldron by Jin Yong. He becomes sworn brothers with the protagonist Wei Xiaobao and Desi Sangye Gyatso.
- The lyrics of the song "Black Thunder" by the Mongolian band The HU is based on a poem about Galdan Boshogtu Khan. The band later turned the song into "Sugaan Essena" for the EA video game Star Wars Jedi: Fallen Order.

== See also ==
- Dzungar–Qing War
- List of Mongol states

Galdan Boshugtu Khan House of Choros (the 14th century-1755) Died: 1697
Regnal titles
Preceded by Sengge	Khong Tayiji of the Dzungar Khanate; 1670–1697	Succeeded by Tsewang Rabtan
