= Khotont =

District in Arkhangai Province, Mongolia

Coordinates: 47°21′47″N 102°28′16″E

Khotont District Хотонт сум ᠬᠣᠲᠤᠩᠲᠤᠰᠤᠮᠤ
- District
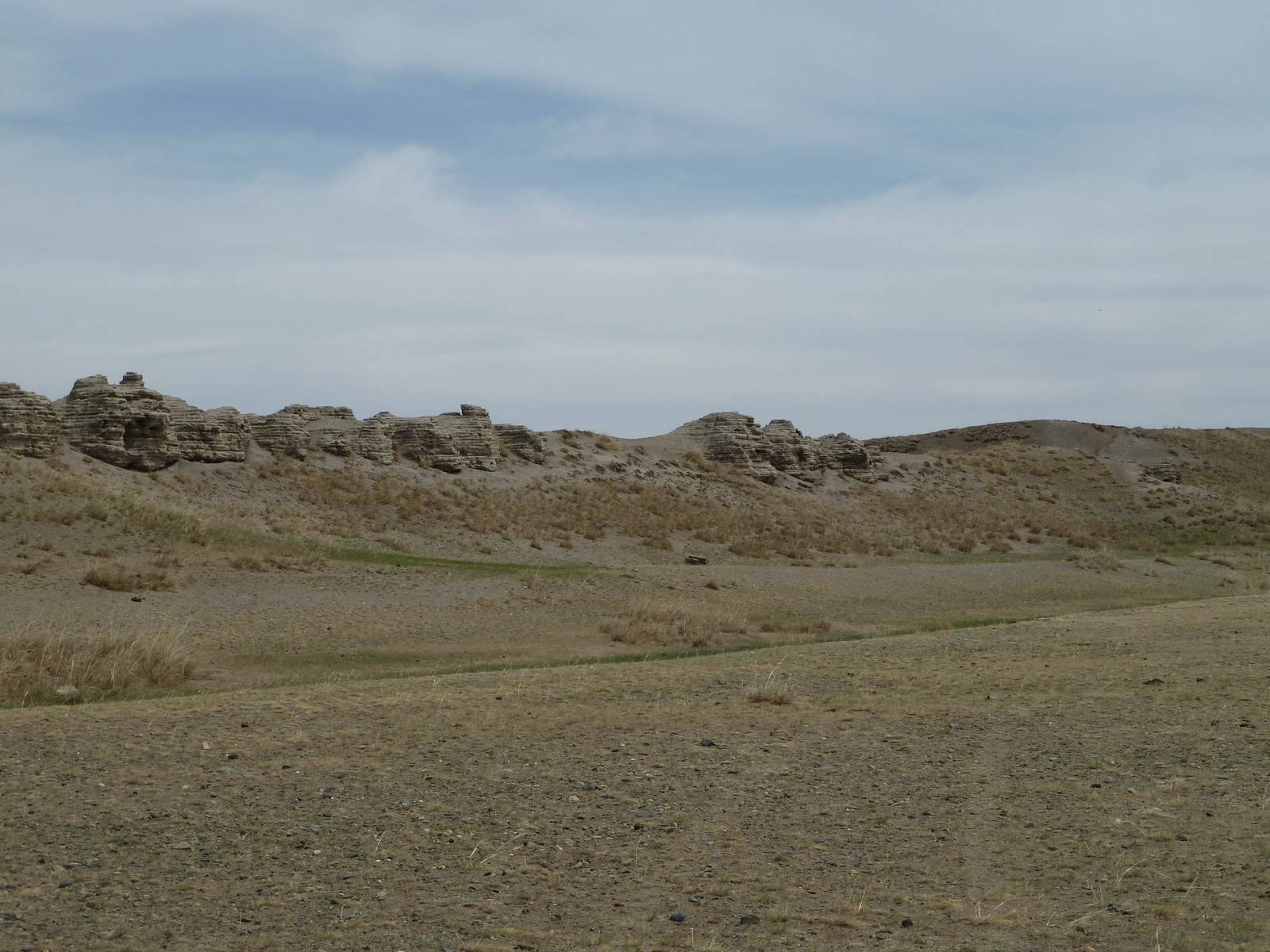

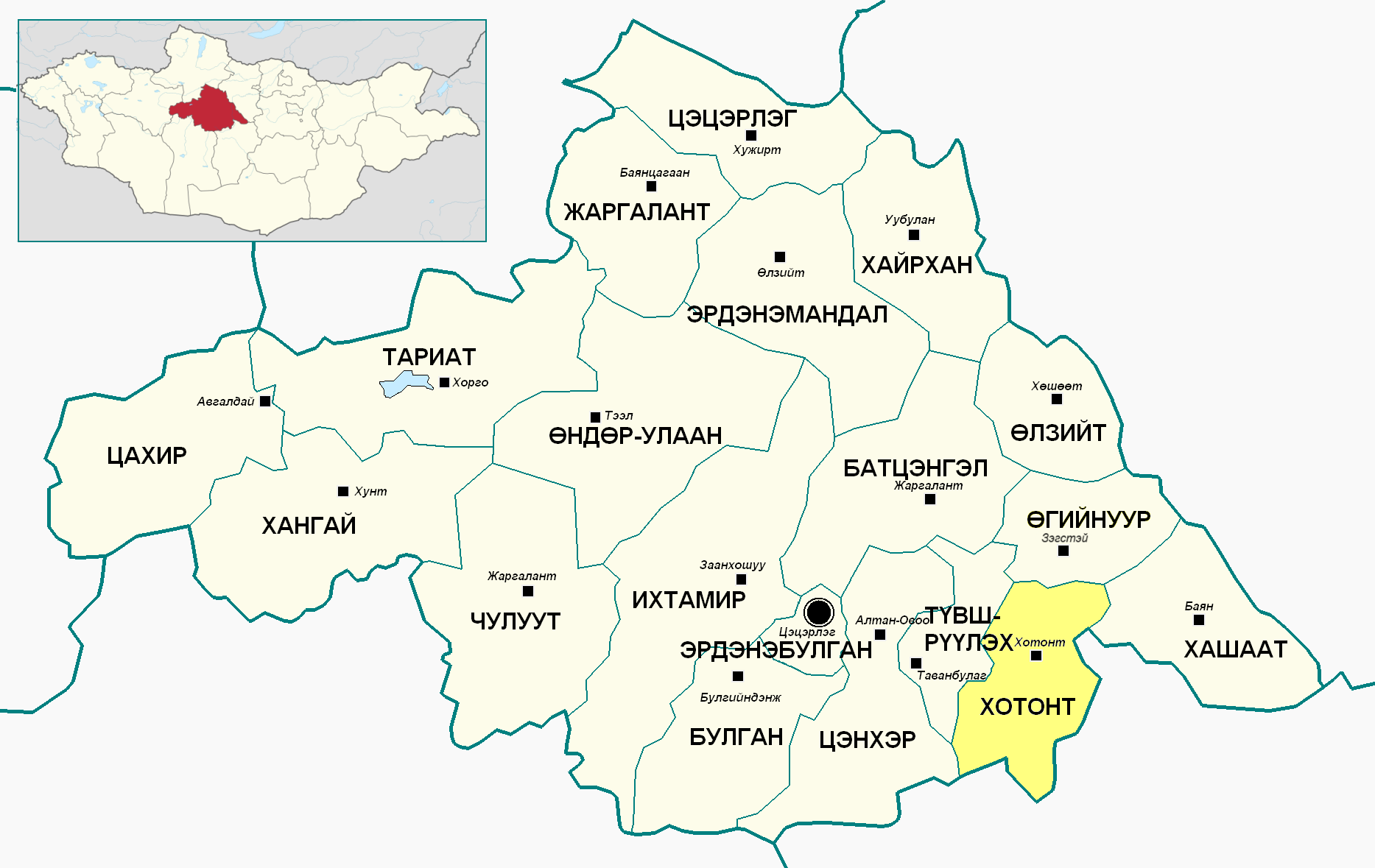
- Khotont District in Arkhangai Province
- Country: Mongolia
- Province: Arkhangai Province

Area
  - Total: 2,200 km^{2} (850 sq mi)
- Time zone: UTC+8 (UTC + 8)

Khotont (Mongolian: Хотонт) is a sum (district) of Arkhangai Province in central Mongolia. In 2009, its population was 4,440. Its population in 2025 was 4,070.

== Administrative divisions ==
The district is divided into six bags, which are:

- Burgaltai
- Khotont
- Khuuvur
- Orkhon
- Ulaan Chuluu
- Undur Sant
