= House of Ögedei =

Mongol noble family

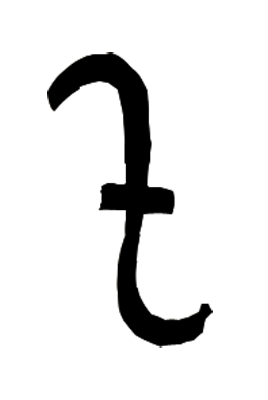
- Tamgha of the House of Ögedei Khan.
- Parent family: House of Borjigin
- Country: Mongol Empire; Chagatai Khanate; Yuan Dynasty
- Current region: Asia; Europe
- Origin: Mongol Empire
- Founded: 13 September 1229
- Founder: Ögedei Khan
- Final ruler: Adai Khan
- Titles: Khan; Khagan; Sultan
- Connected families: House of Jochi; House of Chagatai; House of Tolui
- Traditions: Tengrism; Sunni Islam
- Dissolution: 1438

The House of Ögedei, sometimes called the Ögedeids, was an influential Mongol family and a cadet branch of the Borjigin clan from the 12th to 14th centuries: having been descended from Ögedei Khan (1186-1241) who was the third son and successor of Genghis Khan (1162-1227) that continued the expansion of the Mongol Empire far beyond the East Asian homeland of the Mongols.

When, after the Toluid Möngke Khan's death, the Mongol Empire disintegrated into civil war, the members of the House of Ögedei were influential players in the politics of the region. Among the lines of Genghis Khan's sons — Ögedei, Jochi, Chagatai, and Tolui, the House of Ögedei tended to ally with the Chagataids (descendants of Chagatai) against the House of Jochi, while seeking control for themselves within the Chagatai Khanate at first. The Ögedeids also allied with the Golden Horde against the Yuan founding emperor Kublai (son of Tolui), who was allied with his brother Hulagu, leader of the Ilkhanate in Persia. The Ögedeids attempted to unite the Mongol Empire under their own rule, and Ögedeid princes continued to march against the Yuan dynasty well into the 14th century, such as during the Kaidu–Kublai war.

A peace occurred shortly in 1304, but the war soon resumed. In 1310, Kaidu's successor Chapar Khan surrendered to the Yuan emperor Khayishan, and the territory controlled by the House of Ögedei was divided up by the Chagataids and the Yuan dynasty, after he and his relatives failed to win the Chagatai Khanate. After that, members from this family often appeared as influential contenders or puppet rulers under powerful amirs and noyans in the Northern Yuan dynasty (rump state of the Yuan dynasty) and Transoxiana in the 14th and 15th centuries. Nogai joined Uzbeks and Kazakhs.

== Notable members ==
- Ögedei Khan (1186–1241), son of Genghis Khan, and second Khagan of the Mongol Empire
- Güyük Khan (1206–1248), son of Ögedei, and third Khagan of the Mongol Empire
- Kadan, son of Ögedei, and co-leader of the Mongol force that attacked Poland in the 13th century
- Kaidu (c. 1235 – 1301), grandson of Ögedei, leader of the House of Ögedei, and de facto khan of the Chagatai Khanate
- Khutulun (c. 1260–1306), Kaidu's daughter and warrior princess
- 'Ali-Sultan, the Muslim Khan of the Chagatai Khanate (r.1342/1343)
- Danishmendji (d. 1348), khan of the Chagatai Khanate from 1346 to 1348
- Soyurghatmïsh Khan (d. 1384), khan of the Western Chagatai Khanate
- Sultan Mahmud (Chagatai) (d. 1402), khan of the Western Chagatai Khanate
- Örüg Temür Khan, khan of the Northern Yuan dynasty from 1402 to 1408
- Adai Khan, khan of the Northern Yuan dynasty from 1425 to 1438
- Melig, the judge of the Irtish region
- Arg Temur, rebelled against the Yuan Dynasty

== Descendants of Ögedei ==
=== House of Güyük ===
- Güyük Qan (貴由/guìyóu,گيوك خان/Guyūk khān)
  - Khwaja Oγur (忽察/hūchá,خواجه اغول/Khwaja Āghūl)
    - Tükme (禿苦滅/tūkǔmiè,توکمه/Tūkme)
    - Busju Ebügen (بوسجو ابوکان/Būsjū Ābūkān)
    - Tuqluq (禿魯/tūlŭ,توقلوق/Tūqlūq)
    - Irgendzen (亦児監蔵/yìérjiāncáng)
    - Ölǰei Ebügen (完者也不干/wánzhĕyĕbùgān)
  - Naqu (Güyük family) (腦忽/nǎohū,ناقو/Nāqū)
    - Čabat (چبات/Chabāt)
  - Hoqu (禾忽/héhū,هوقو/Hūqū)

=== House of Köden ===
- Köden (闊端/hédān,كوتان/kūtān)
  - Mergidei (滅里吉歹/mièlǐjídǎi)
    - Yes buqa (也速不花/yěsùbúhuā,ییسوبوقا/yīsū būqā)
  - Möngetü (蒙哥都/mēnggēdōu,مونكاتو/mūnkātū)
    - Irinǰin (亦憐真/yìliánzhēn,ایرنچان/īrinchān)
  - J̌ibig temür (只必帖木児/zhībìtiēmùér,جینك تیمور/jīnk tīmūr)
    - Tebile (帖必烈/tiēbìliè,ممبوله=تیبوله/tībūle)
    - Külük (曲列魯/qūlièlǔ,كورلوك/kūrlūk)
      - Bek temür (別帖木児/biétiēmùér)
        - Yes ebügen (也速也不干/yěsùyěbúgān)
          - Toq temür (脱脱木児/tuōtuōmùér)

=== House of Küčü ===
- Küčü (闊出/kuòchū,کوچو/Kūchū)
  - Širemün (昔列門/xīlièmén,شيرامون/Shīrāmūn)
      - Qunǰi (قونجی/Qūnjī)
      - Qadai (哈歹/hādǎi,قادای/Qādāī)
      - Aluγui (阿魯灰/ālǔhuī,القوی/Ālqūī)
      - Sadur (سادور/Sādūr)
  - Boladči (孛羅赤/bóluochì,بولاوجی/Būlāūjī)
  - Söse (小薛/xiǎoxuē,سوسه/Sūse)

=== House of Qaračar ===
- Qaračar (哈剌察兒/hǎlácháér,قراچار/Qarāchār)
  - Tötaq (脱脱/tuōtuō,توظاق/Tūṭāq)

=== House of Qaši ===
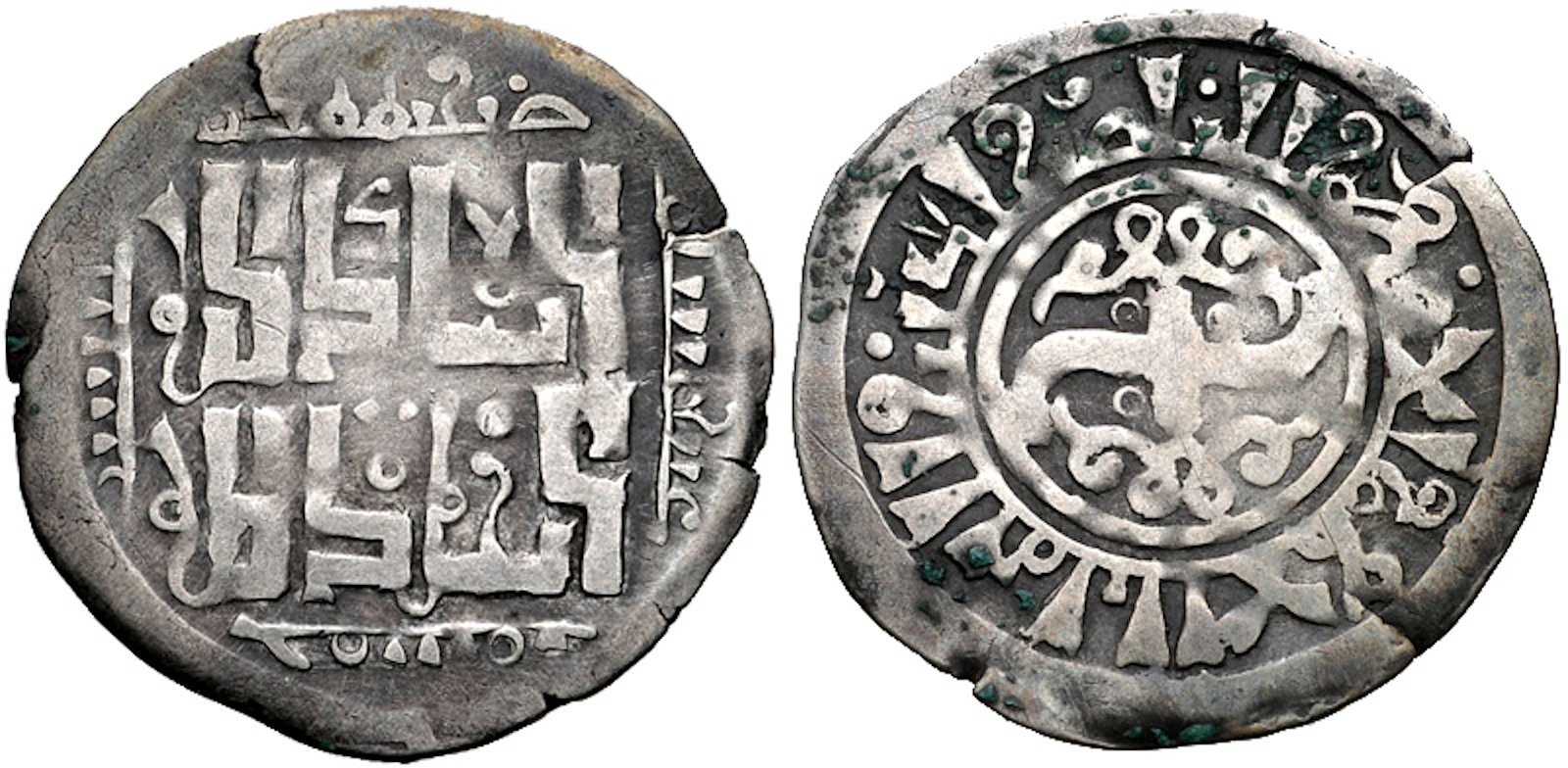
Ögedeids coinage of the time of Qaidu. AH 668-701 AD 1269-1302 Otrar mint. Dated AH 685 (AD 1286).

- Qaši (合失/héshī,قاشی/qāshī)
  - Qaidu (海都/hǎidōu,قايدو/qāīdū)
    - Čapar (察八児/chábāér,چاپار/chāpār)
      - Ölǰei temür (完者帖木児/wánzhětiēmùér)
        - Qulatai (忽剌台/ hūlátái)
    - Yangičar (يانگيچار/yāngīchār)
    - Oros (Kaidu family) (斡羅思/wòluosī, اوروس/ūrūs)
    - Sarban (Kaidu family) (ساربان/sārbān)
    - Qutulun Čaγan (قوتولو ن جغا/qūtūlūn jaghā)

=== House of Qada'an ===
- Qada'an oγul (合丹/hédān,قدان اغور/Qadān āghūr)
  - Dorǰi (覩爾赤/dǔěrchì,دورجی/Dūrjī)
    - Söse (小薛/xiǎoxuē,سوسه/Sūse)
      - Singgibal (星吉班/xīngjíbān)
    - Askiba (اسکبه/Askiba)
  - Yesür (也速児/yěsùér,ییسور/Yīsūr)
  - Qibčaq (قبچاق/Qibchāq)
    - Quril (قوریل/Qūrīl)
  - Qada'an ubuk (قدان اوبوک/Qadān ūbūk)
  - Qurmši oγul (قورمشی/Qūrmshī)
  - Yeye (ییه/Yeye)
    - Örük temür (اورک تیمور/Ūrk tīmūr)
    - Yiš temür (ایش تیمور/Yīsh tīmūr)
  - Ebügen (也不干/yěbúgān,ابوکانAbūkān)
    - Qorangsa (火郎撒/huǒlángsā)
  - Yesün tu'a (也孫脱/yěsūntuō)
  - Qoniči (火你/huǒnǐ)

=== House of Melik ===
- Melig(滅里/mièlǐ,ملک/Melig)
  - Tuman (禿満/tūmǎn,تومان/Tūmān)
    - Küčün (曲春/qūchūn)
      - Temürči (帖木児赤/tiēmùérchì)
        - Aruγ Temür (阿魯輝帖木児/ālŭhuītiēmùér)
        - Qutuq Temür (忽都帖木児/hūdōutiēmùér)
  - Toγan Buqa (تگان بوقا/Togān Būqā)
    - Olqut (اولوکتو/Ūlūktū)
  - Toγančar (توغانچار/Tūghānchār)
  - Torčan (تورجان/Tūrjān)
  - Toqu (脱忽/tuōhū,توقو/Tūqū)
  - Abdullah (俺都剌/ǎndōulà,عبدالله/Abdullah)
    - Ayači (愛牙赤/àiyáchì)
      - Taiping (太平/tàipíng)

== See also ==
- Division of the Mongol Empire
- Chagatai Khanate
- Northern Yuan dynasty
- Melik
