= Sengge =

- Khong Tayiji

Khong Tayiji of the Dzungar Khanate
- Reign: 1653–1671
- Predecessor: Erdeni Batur
- Successor: Galdan Boshugtu Khan
- Died: 1671
- Consort: Queen Anu
- House: Choros
- Dynasty: Dzungar Khanate
- Father: Erdeni Batur

Sengge (Mongolian: Сэнгэ Цэцэн Хунтайж, Chinese: 僧格; died 1671) was a Choros-Oirat prince and the chosen successor of his father Erdeni Batur to rule over the Dzungar. Sengge ruled over a section of the Dzungar from 1653 until his murder in 1671 by his two older half-brothers Chechen Tayiji and Zotov Batur. Sengge is best known for defeating Erinchin Lobsang Tayiji, the third Altan Khan, in 1667 and eliminating the Altan Khanate as a potential future threat to the Dzungar.

Before his death in 1653 Erdeni Batur named his third son Sengge as his successor to the consternation and disbelief of Chechen Tayiji and Zotov Batur. Erdeni Batur's decision to name Sengge as the next ruler of the Dzungar was based on solely on his belief that Sengge was the ablest of his eight sons. As Erdeni Batur's chosen successor, Sengge was given the southern half of the Dzungar lands. The northern half would be split among Erdeni Batur's remaining seven sons.

Sengge's brothers were not content with their inheritance and were also jealous that Sengge may be named Khong Tayiji of the Dzungar. To gain a larger share for themselves both Chechen Tayiji and Zotov Batur made several attempts to assassinate Sengge. In 1657, the succession dispute among the Dzungar led to an all out civil war for Oirat. Its most powerful leaders, Ochirtu and his half-brother Ablai Taishi, chose sides and assembled coalitions to fight against one another. With Ochirtu's support, Sengge and his forces claimed early victories in 1659, but the war dragged on until 1661 when Ablai Taishi and his forces were finally routed and decamped to Russian lands. In 1671, Chechen Tayiji and Zotov Batur finally murdered their younger half-brother Sengge as he slept.

Under Sengge, past commercial trading agreements between Russia and the Dzungar were no longer honored by the Oirat groups roaming the northern border. However, Sengge still forcefully demanded Russia stop claiming tribute from the small Siberian tribes that he deemed to be the vassals of only the Dzungar. This issue would cause several skirmishes between the Cossacks and the Dzungar forces during Sengge's reign and would remain unresolved at the time of his death.

Sengge House of Choros (the 14th century-1755) Died: 1670
Regnal titles
Preceded by Erdeni Batur	Khong Tayiji of the Dzungar Khanate; 1653–1670	Succeeded by Galdan Boshugtu Khan
