= Erdeni Batur =

Founder of the Dzungar Khanate

- Khong Tayiji

Khong Tayiji of the Dzungar Khanate
- Reign: 1634–1653
- Coronation: 1634?
- Predecessor: Kharkhul (The chief of the Oirat Confederation)
- Successor: Sengge
- Spouse: Amin-Dara
- Issue: Sengge, Galdan
Names
- Batur khundtaidji Ba’atur Khongtaiji
- House: Choros
- Dynasty: Dzungar Khanate
- Father: Kharkhul
- Religion: Tibetan Buddhism

Erdeni Batur (Mongolian: Эрдэнэ Баатар Хунтайж; Chinese: 巴圖爾琿台吉; d. 1653) was a Choros-Oirat prince generally considered to be the founder of the Dzungar Khanate, centered in the Dzungaria region, currently in north-westernmost part of China.

== Early life ==
Erdeni Batur was the son of Kharkhul who was taishi (Mongolian: тайш) of the dominant Choros tribe and the leader of the allied Four Oirat, collectively known as "Dzungars." After the death of his father in 1634, Erdeni Batur assumed his father's position and formed the Dzungar Khanate on the Tarbagatai Mountains, marrying Amin Dara.

In so doing, Erdeni Batur led the Dzungars to several victorious military campaigns over the Kazakhs to his west. To the north in southern Siberia, Erdeni Batur gave Russia access to salt mines, thereby ending a 20-year conflict, in exchange for diplomatic and trade relations. The commercial ties, which remained intact throughout his rule, and the prosperity generated by such ties with Russian outposts further solidified Erdeni Batur's prestige and position among the Oirats and the leaders of the adjacent nations.

== Reign ==
Within the Khanate, Erdeni Batur set out on an ambition campaign of empire building activities. For instance, he established the capital city of the Dzungar Khanate, the city of modern-day Yining with a monastery called Khobak Sari south of Lake Zaisan on the Emil River, near the modern city of Tacheng, and built monasteries throughout Dzungar territory. He also promoted Buddhism to his subjects such as the Clear Script, and encouraged them to resettle to the new capital on the new monastery as new buildings were constructed.

He also assisted Güshi Khan and his brother, Kundulun Ubashi, to move a substantial part of the Khoshut-Oirat tribe from the Lake Zaisan area to the area around Qinghai Lake – what the Mongols call Kokonoor and the Tibetans called Amdo – in 1636, where they soon would establish the Khoshut Khanate. As Combined forces the Dzungars and Khoshuts attack the Khalkha prince, Choghtu Khong Taiyiji at the Battle of the Bloody Hills.

The Fifth Dalai Lama granted Erdeni Batur the title, "Khong Tayiji" for military support he provided Güshi Khan to topple the enemies of the Gelug sect — as well by granting this title, the Fifth Dalai Lama had hoped to have another ally protecting and promoting his Gelug lineage above the others.

=== War against the Kazakhs ===
In 1635, Erdeni batur invaded the Kazakh Khanate, and captured Jangir Khan at the Ili river he continued his offensives until 1638 to form a Diplomacy with Mongols, for a pan-Mongolian alliance in 1640. The entente took place inside Dzungar territory at a place called Ulan Buraa, near the Tarbagatai Mountains on the border between what is now the Xinjiang province of China and Kyrgyzstan.

Afterwards, he resumed his campaigns and captured cities and towns on the Syr Darya, including the cities of Tashkent and Turkistan defeating Uzbek relief forces. However his army was soon defeated at the Battle of Orbulaq, facing a large counterinvasion force of 22,600 men, losing heavy casualties of around ten thousand men.

In 1646, he attempted another invasion against the Kazakhs, capturing Sairam and Turkistan as well forcing the Kazakhs and Kyrgyz civilians into a vassalage. But soon Bukharans relieved the captured cities and with another defeat, he requested for Khoshut assistance, with sending Ochirtu Khan's son Galdamba to fight the Kazakhs.

== Decline and death ==
Erdeni Batur continued to consolidate his power, preparing the Dzungar Khanate for its attack upon the Qing for control over Central Asia. Upon his death in 1653, Erdeni Batur was succeeded by his third son, Sengge.

Erdeni Batur House of Choros (the 14th century-1755) Died: 1653
Regnal titles
Preceded by Khara Khula	Khong Tayiji of the Dzungar Khanate; 1634–1653	Succeeded by Sengge
