= Timeline of the Oirats =

This is a timeline of the Oirats, also known as the Kalmyks or Dzungars.

== 6th century ==
Year	Date	Event
6TH - 8TH		ÖLÜ-T or YELÜ-T IN THE EAST. According to Erdeniyin Tobchi (17 century), ÖLÜ-T or YELÜ-T (-t for plural) was one of the leading familial lineages in the Oirat coalition. The first documented reference to ÖLÜ-T (YELÜ-T) was Onginsk "rune" inscriptions dated in the 6th century. The political elite in the Rouran and Tobgach empires were the YELÜ-T Mongolic speakers. Although these two empires encompassed multilingual populations, the language of diplomacy, trade, and culture was a ÖLÜ (YELÜ) dialect of ancient Mongolic descent. ÖLÜ-T or YELÜ-T IN THE CASPIAN STEPPES, 6th - 8th century The YELÜ-AVARS, originally hailing from Mongolia, established their formidable empire known as the Rouran Khanate (330-555 CE). However, in the midst of the sixth century, they faced destruction at the hands of the Turks, who pursued them as far as the Caucasus region. This displacement triggered a series of events. Settling in the Caucasus around 558, the Mongolic Avars intervened in Germanic tribal conflicts, forming alliances such as with the Lombards to overthrow the Gepidae, who were Byzantine allies. Between 550 and 575, they solidified their presence by establishing the Avar Khanate (6th to 8th century) in the Hungarian plain, situated between the Danube and Tisza rivers.

== 13th century ==
Year	Date	Event
1207		Jochi, Genghis Khan's oldest son, subjugates the 'forest peoples' - Oirat, Kyrgyz, and Buryat
1207-1208		Quduqa Bäki, the leader of the Oirats, becomes a QUDA ally, or in-law familial lineage to Genghis Khan and his imperial lineage. Genghis Khan marries his daughter Checheyiken and Jochi's daughter Holuiqan to two Quduqa Bäki's sons
1217-1336		Oirats were prominent in the Middle Eastern Il-Khanate, whose founder Hulegu married two Oirat women in succession TURKEY. An Oirat tümen under the Il-Khans’ kürgens (son-in-laws) settled in the area of Diyarbakır. EGYPT. In 1296, this tümen moved to MAMLUK EGYPT when GHAZAN KHAN favored their local Turkmen rivals. By 1336, Ali-Padshah, a member of the Oirat ruling family, was a contender for power in the disintegrating Il- Khanate. KHORASAN. Arghun Aqa, a famous Oirat bureaucrat, became governor of Khorasan (eastern Iran) and founder of a prominent Oirat family there.
1260-1264		Oirats had strong QUDA ties to the families of Jochi’s sons Hordu and BATU. They also were QUDA to QUBILAI KHAN’s brother ARIQ-BÖKE (d. 1266) and his descendants, whose territory bordered on the Oirats’. Toluid Civil War: The Four Oirat (Choros, Torghut, Dörbet, and Khoid) is formed in support of Ariq Böke against Kublai Khan

== 14th century ==
Year	Date	Event
1388		Jorightu Khan Yesüder, a descendant of Ariq Böke, kills Uskhal Khan Tögüs Temür and occupies the Northern Yuan throne with the backing of the Oirats
1399		The Four Oirat break away from Northern Yuan

== 15th century ==
Year	Date	Event
1414	April	Second Mongol Campaign: Ming forces engage Oirats at the Tuul River, suffering heavy casualties, but ultimately prevail through the use of heavy cannon bombardments
1423	August	Fourth Mongol Campaign: The Yongle Emperor launches an offensive against Arughtai only to find out he had already been defeated by the Oirats
1433		The Oirats install Taisun Khan as leader of the Eastern Mongols
1449	July	Tumu Crisis: Esen Taishi of the Oirats and de facto ruler of the Northern Yuan launches an invasion of the Ming dynasty
1449	4 August	Tumu Crisis: The Zhengtong Emperor departs from Beijing to personally confront Esen Taishi
1449	30 August	Tumu Crisis: The Ming rearguard is defeated
1449	1 September	Tumu Crisis: The Ming army is annihilated and the Zhengtong Emperor is captured by Esen Taishi
1449	27 October	Esen Taishi lays siege to Beijing but fails to take it and withdraws after 5 days
1451		Esen Taishi declares himself Yuan Emperor, which causes widespread dissent among his followers
1454		Esen Taishi is killed and the Northern Yuan is once more split into two portions between the Oirats and Eastern Mongols
1457		Oirat-Uzbek War: The Oirats invade the Uzbek Khanate and defeat Abu'l-Khayr Khan, plundering the cities on the Syr Darya
1469		The Oirats occupy Mobei
1472		The Oirats invade Moghulistan and defeat Yunus Khan
1480		Dayan Khan pushes the Oirats westward

== 16th century ==
Year	Date	Event
1507-82		Altan Khan expels the Oirats from Mongolia
1587		Kharkhul repels an attack by Ubasi Khong Tayiji

== 17th century ==
Year	Date	Event
1607		Oirat emissaries reach the Russians at Tara
1608		A group of Khoshut Oirats raid the Nogai Horde
1616		The first Russian embassy reaches the Oirats
1620		Kharkhul of the Choros clan attacks Ubasi Khong Tayiji but is defeated and the Oirats are forced to retreat into Siberia
1622		Oirats lay siege to Kuznetsk but fail to take it
1623		Kharkhul unites the Four Oirat and defeat Ubasi Khong Tayiji
1625		Kalmyk Khanate: The Torghut chieftain Kho Orluk moves 50,000 families west
1628		Kalmyk Khanate: The Kalmyks attack the Nogai Horde, displacing them
1634		Dzungar Khanate: Kharkhul dies and is succeeded by his son Erdeni Batur, who establishes the Dzungars on the upper Emil River south of the Tarbagatai Mountains
1636		Güshi Khan of the Khoshut responds to a Gelug invitation and invades Qinghai with 10,000 troops
1637		Güshi Khan kills Choghtu Khong Tayiji in the Battle of the Bloody Hills and proceeds to invade Tibet
1642		Khoshut Khanate: Güshi Khan conquers Tibet and bestows supreme authority over the region to the 5th Dalai Lama, who reciprocates by granting him the title of Chogyal (Dharma King)
1644		Kalmyk Khanate: Kho Orluk is killed while pursuing the fleeing Nogais and is succeeded by Shukhur Daichin
1646		Shukhur Daichin, Erdeni Batur and Güshi Khan send tribute to the Qing dynasty
1651		Kalmyk Khanate: The Kalmyks inflict a massive defeat on the Crimean Khanate and Nogais
1653		Dzungar Khanate: Erdeni Batur dies and is succeeded by his son Sengge
1661		Kalmyk Khanate: Shukhur Daichin is succeeded by Puntsug
1665–1667		Invasion of Yenisei: Dzungars and Khakas invade Yenisei river against the Tsardom of Russia and Altan Khanate and subjugate the Kyrgyz.
1668		Kalmyk Khanate: Puntsug joins the Russians in attacking the Crimean Khanate
1670		Kalmyk Khanate: Puntsug is succeeded by Ayuka Khan
1671		Dzungar Khanate: Sengge is assassinated and succeeded by his younger brother Galdan Boshugtu Khan
1678		Dzungar conquest of Altishahr: Ismail Khan drives out to the Aq Taghliq Khoja Afaq Khoja, who seeks help from the 5th Dalai Lama, who in turn writes a letter to the Dzungar Khanate for help.
1679		Dzungar conquest of Altishahr: Galdan Boshugtu Khan conquers Hami and Turpan
1680		Dzungar conquest of Altishahr: Galdan Boshugtu Khan conquers Kashgar, Yarkand, and Khotan, killing Ismail's family. Abd ar-Rashid Khan II is installed as ruler.
1682		Dzungar Khanate: Riots break out, forcing Abd ar-Rashid Khan II to flee; his brother Muhammad Imin Khan succeeds him
1684		Dzungar Khanate: Galdan Boshugtu Khan takes Tashkent and Sairam
1686		Dzungar Khanate: Galdan Boshugtu Khan attacks Andijan
1688		Dzungar–Qing Wars: Galdan Boshugtu Khan invades Mongolia with 30,000 troops and defeats the Tüsheet Khan Chikhundorj, annexing the region
1689		Dzungar Khanate: While Galdan Boshugtu Khan was at war, his nephew Tsewang Rabtan seized the throne in Dzungaria
1690	3 September	Battle of Ulan Butung: Galdan Boshugtu Khan leads 20,000 troops into battle with a Qing army 300 km north of Beijing, ending with Dzungar withdrawal
1693		Dzungar Khanate: Muhammad Imin Khan attacks the Dzungars but is overthrown by Afaq Khoja, whose son Yahiya Khoja is enthroned
1695		Dzungar Khanate: Afaq Khoja and Yahiya Khoja are killed in a rebellion
1696		Battle of Jao Modo: The Qing dynasty invades Mongolia with 100,000 troops in three columns. Galdan Boshugtu Khan suffers defeat against the Western Route Army but manages to escape.
1696		Dzungar Khanate: Akbash Khan is enthroned but the begs of Kashgar refuse to acknowledge him. Dzungar troops are brought in by Akbash to enforce his rule. However the Dzungars install Mirza Alim Shah Beg; so ends the Yarkent Khanate and Chagatai rule.
1697	4 April	Dzungar–Qing Wars: Galdan Boshugtu Khan dies in the Altai Mountains
1697		Dzungar–Qing Wars: ʿAbdu l-Lāh Tarkhān Beg rebels against the Dzungar Khanate in Hami
1698		Dzungar–Qing Wars: Qing dynasty occupies Hami

== 18th century ==
Year	Date	Event
1710		Dzungar Khanate: Dzungars demolish a Russian fort on the Biya River
1717		Khoshut Khanate: The Dzungars invade and kill Lha-bzang Khan, ending the Khoshut Khanate
1720		Chinese expedition to Tibet (1720): The Qing dynasty expels the Dzungars from Tibet, beginning the period of Tibet under Qing rule
1720		Dzungar–Qing Wars: Amin Khoja leads a rebellion in Turpan against the Dzungar Khanate and defects to the Qing dynasty
1724		Kalmyk Khanate: Ayuka Khan is succeeded by Tseren Donduk Khan
1727		Dzungar Khanate: Tsewang Rabtan dies and is succeeded by his son Galdan Tseren
1732		Dzungar–Qing Wars: The Dzungars attack Amin Khoja, who takes his people to settle in Guazhou
1735		Kalmyk Khanate: Tseren Donduk Khan is succeeded by Donduk Ombo Khan
1737		Dzungar–Qing Wars: Abuse by the Dzungars cause residents of the Tarim Basin to flee to the Qing dynasty
1741		Kalmyk Khanate: Donduk Ombo Khan is succeeded by Donduk Dashi Khan
1745		Dzungar Khanate: Galdan Tseren dies and is succeeded by his son Tsewang Dorji Namjal
1750		Dzungar Khanate: Tsewang Dorji Namjal is overthrown by his cousin Lama Dorji
1752		Dzungar Khanate: Dawachi takes control of the khanate with the aid of Amursana
1754		Dzungar–Qing Wars: The Dörbet and Amursana defect to the Qing dynasty
1755		Dzungar–Qing Wars: The Qing dynasty sends 50,000 troops in two columns against the Dzungars, meeting little resistance, and complete the destruction of the khanate in just 100 days, however Amursana revolts in the aftermath
1757		Amursana flees the Qing dynasty, dying in Tobolsk
1761		Kalmyk Khanate: Donduk Dashi Khan is succeeded by Ubashi Khan
1771		Kalmyk Khanate: Ubashi Khan leads 170,000 Kalmyks on a return migration to Dzungaria with less than 70,000 reaching their destination where they are received as Qing subjects; after failing to stop the Kalmyk migration, Catherine the Great abolishes the khanate

== Gallery ==
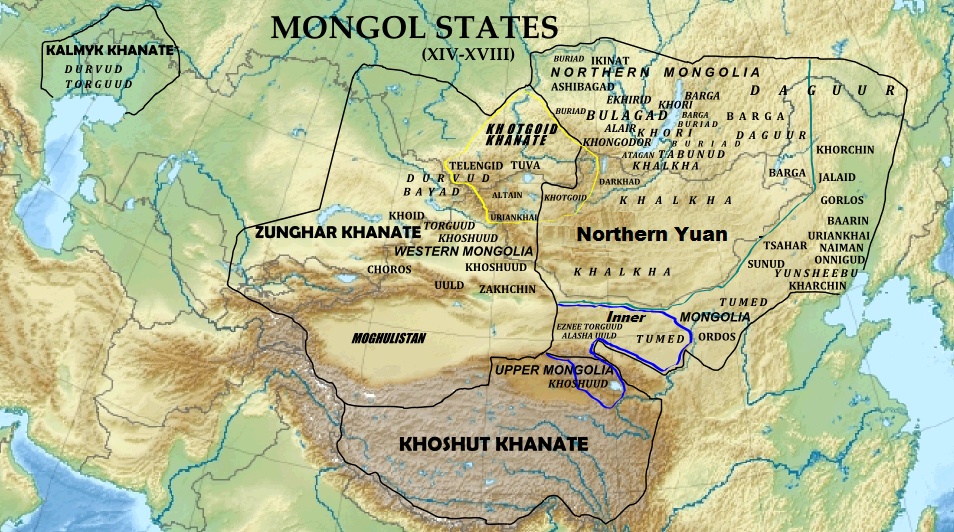
The Kalmyk Khanate (1630–1771), Dzungar Khanate (1634–1758), and Khoshut Khanate (1642–1717)

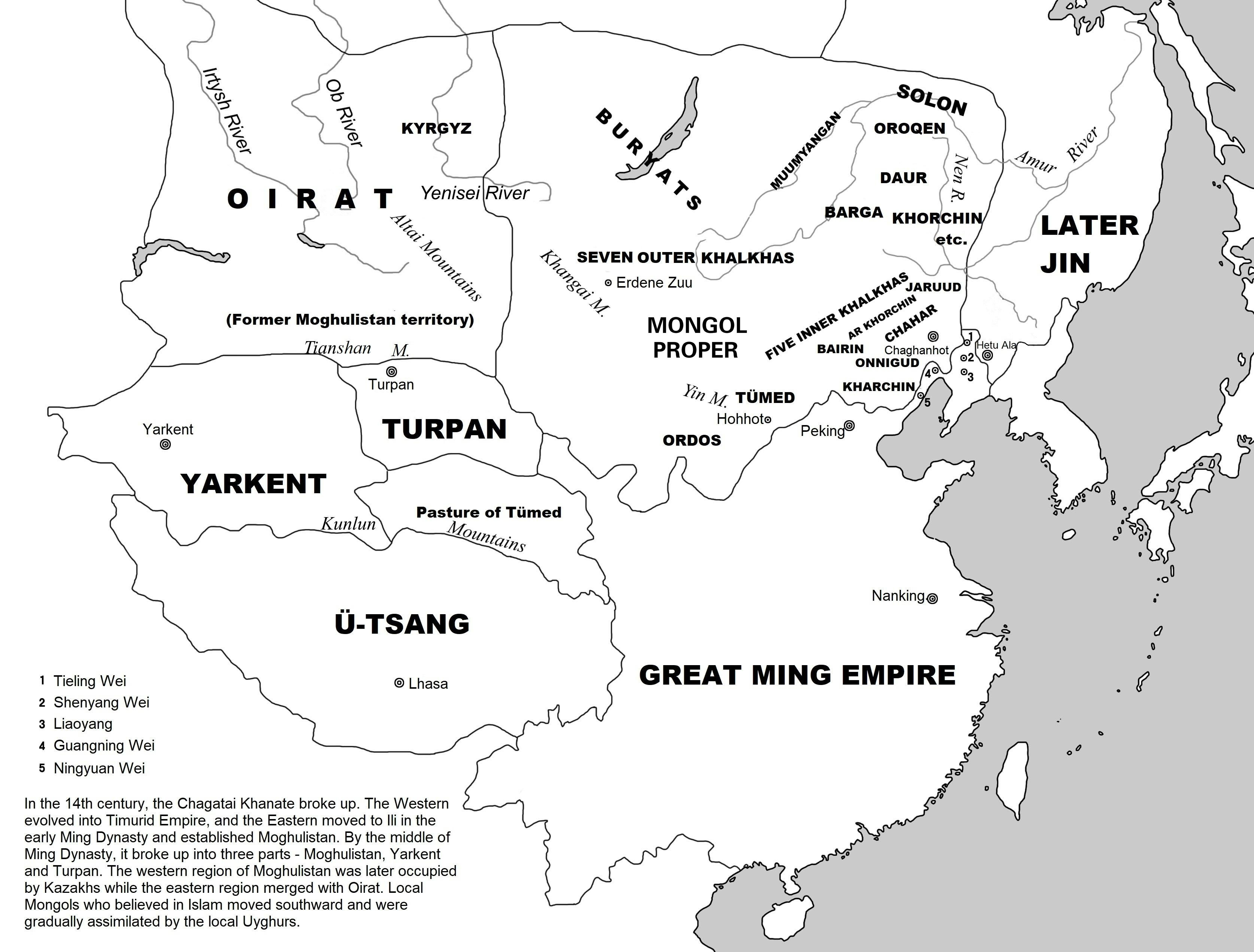
Mainland East Asia in 1616

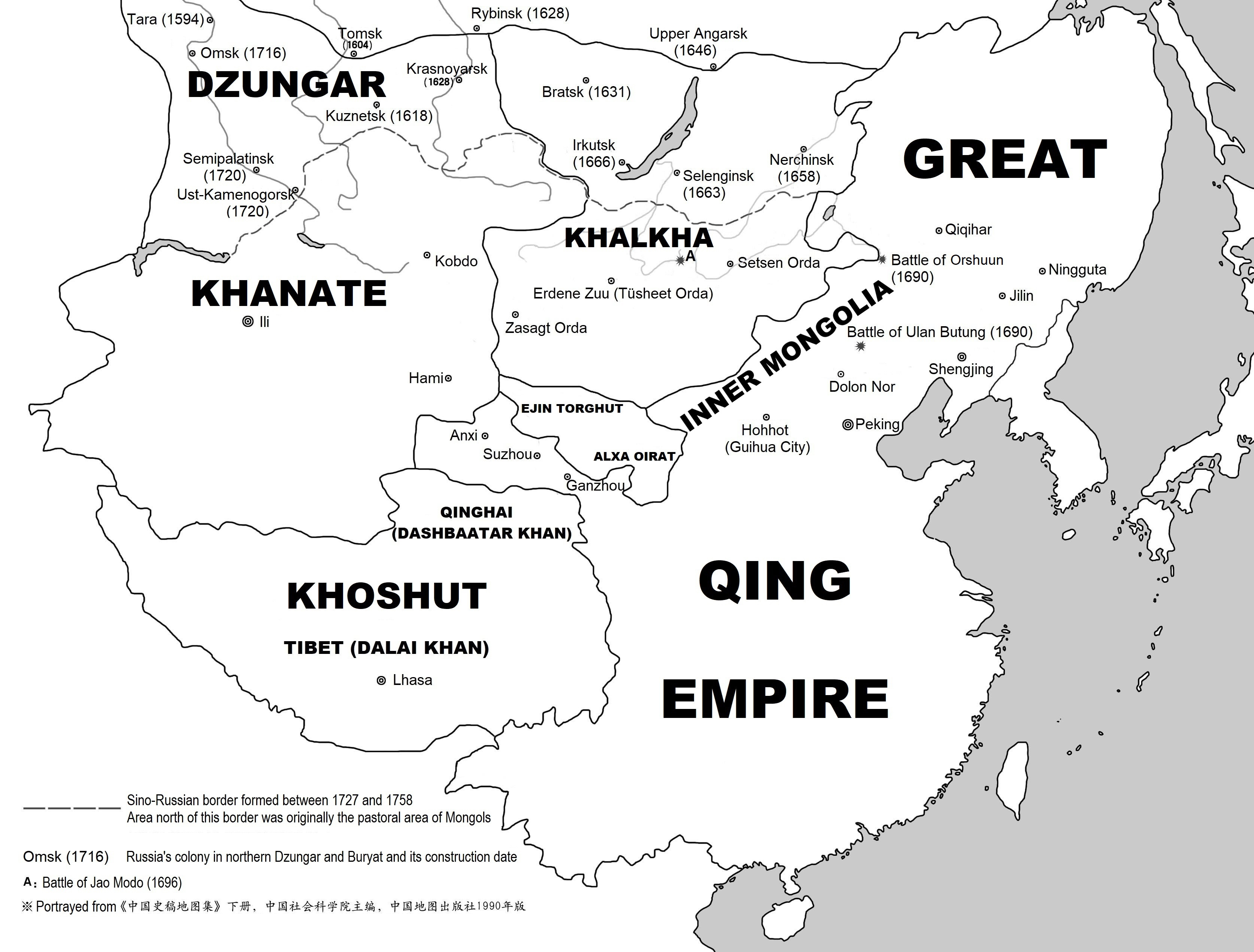
Mainland East Asia in 1688

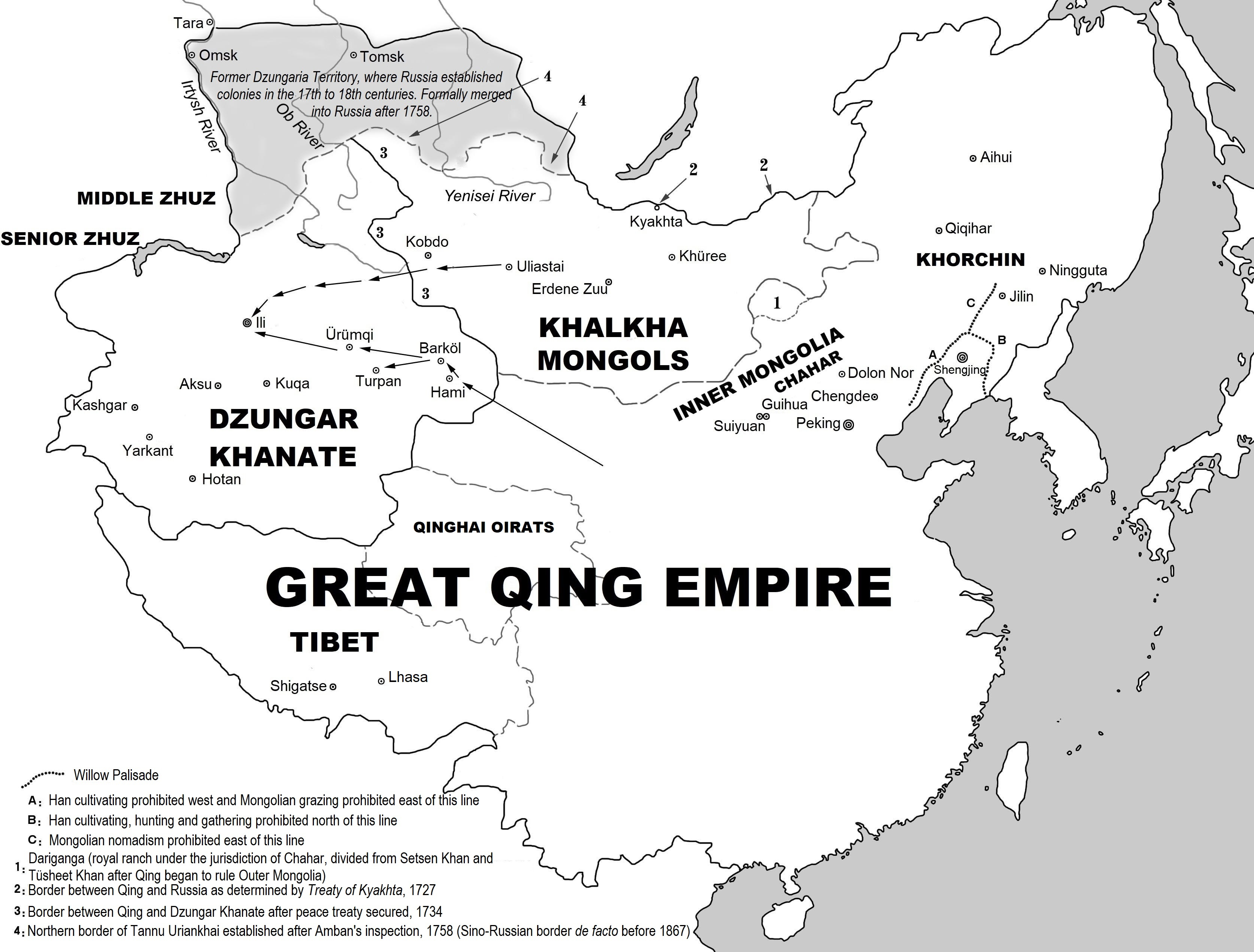
Mainland East Asia in 1757

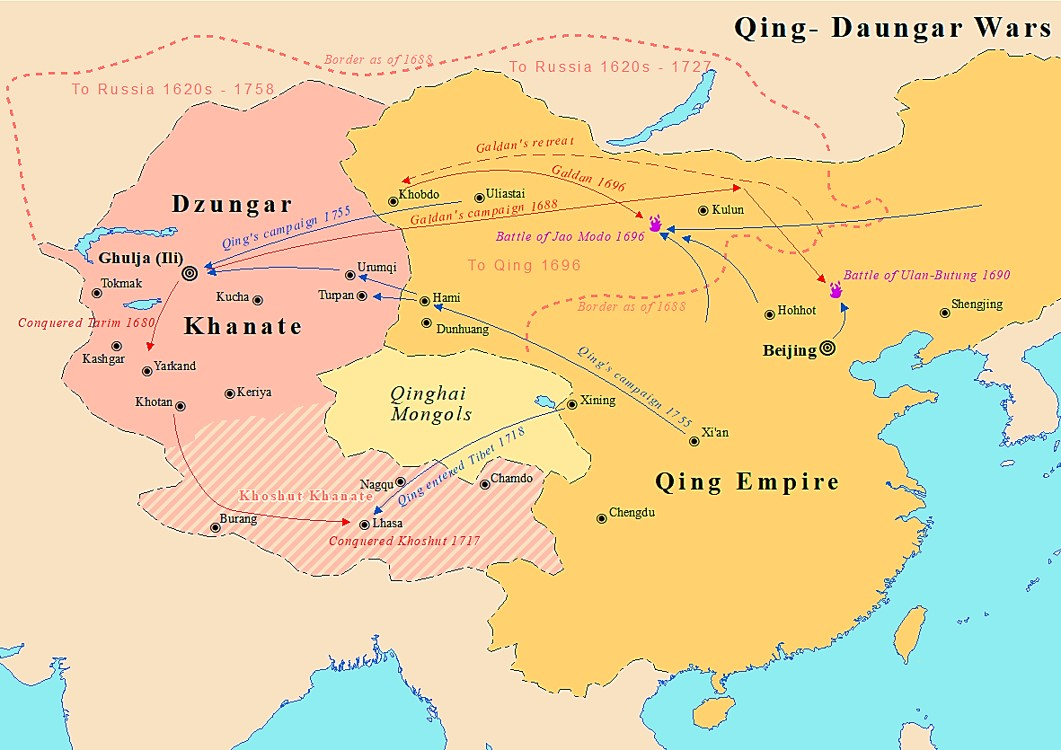
Dzungar–Qing Wars (1687–1757)

== Bibliography ==
- Adle, Chahryar (2003), History of Civilizations of Central Asia 5
- Bregel, Yuri (2003), An Historical Atlas of Central Asia, Brill
- Christian, David (2018), A History of Russia, Central Asia and Mongolia 2, Wiley Blackwell
- Grousset, Rene (1970), Empire of the Steppes
- Sinor, Denis (1990), The Cambridge History of Early Inner Asia, Volume 1, Cambridge University Press
- Twitchett, Denis (1998), The Cambridge History of China Volume 7 The Ming Dynasty, 1368—1644, Part I, Cambridge University Press
