= Dawachi =

Dawachi 達瓦齊 Даваач
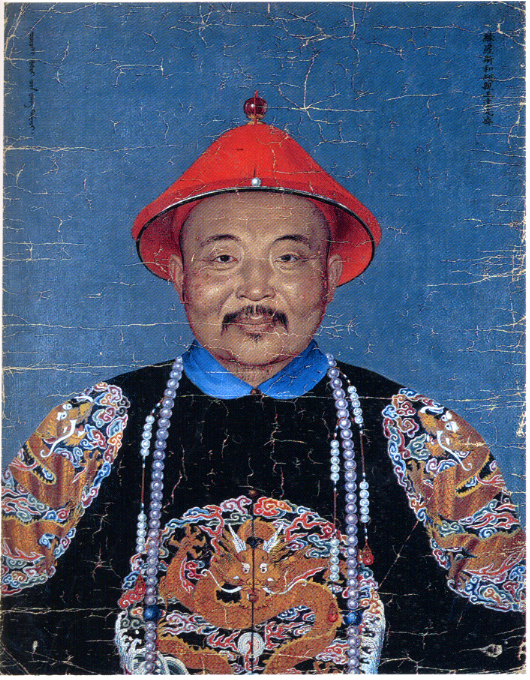
- Dawachi in Qing costume. Painted by Jean Denis Attiret at the Qing court in Beijing, between 1755 and 1759.

Khong Tayiji of the Dzungar Khanate
- Reign: 1753–1755
- Coronation: 1753
- Predecessor: Lama Dorji
- Died: 1759; Kalgan
- House: Choros
- Dynasty: Dzungar Khanate

Dawachi (Chinese: 達瓦齊; pinyin: Dáwǎqí; Mongolian: Даваач; died 1759) was the last ruler of the Dzungar Khanate from 1753 until his defeat at the hands of Qing and Mongol forces at Ili in 1755.

Dawachi belonged to the highest rank of Dzungar aristocracy. He traced his ancestry back directly to Erdeni Batur (died 1635), the founder of the Dzungar Khanate. His grandfather was Tsering Dhondup. His brother, Tsewang Rabtan (1643-1727), led the Dzungar invasion and occupation of Tibet in 1717. His father was the second cousin of Galdan Tseren, the Khong Tayiji of the Dzungar Khanate from 1727 to 1745.

== Biography ==
Noyon Dawachi, who roamed with his nomadic camps in Tarbagatai and the Mongolian Altai, had over 30,000 people under his rule. Dawachi and his Khoit-Oirat ally Amursana opposed the rule of Lama Dorji (1728-1753), who had seized the Dzungar throne after assassinating his brother Tsewang Dorji Namjal in 1750. The reign of Lama Dorji's father, Galdan Tseren, represented a resurgence of the Dzungar Khanate's political, military and economic influence in central Asia after the defeats of Galdan Boshugtu Khan's forces by the Qing army fifty years earlier.

When Galdan Tseren died in 1745, his three sons battled over succession. The political anarchy that ensued all but eliminated the gains made under Galdan Tseren. In 1751, Lama Dorji's pre-emptive military strike defeated forces loyal to Dawachi, who was forced to flee across the border into Kazakh Khanate territory. With a thousand of his men, he and Amursana marched to Ili where they surprised Lama Dorji and killed him on 13 January 1753. Other sources claim that Lama Dorji was killed by his own troops in December 1752.

== Dawachi seizes power ==
Following the death of Lama Dorji, Dawachi claimed the title taisha of the Dzungars based on his aristocratic lineage. Amursana, although a prince, was of considerably simpler descent and was of Khoit rather than Dzungar origin. Nevertheless, Amursana, who had married the daughter of Ablai Khan, leader of the neighboring Kazakh Khanate, and had negotiated the support of various Oirat clan leaders, called on Dawachi to divide the Khanate's lands between them as Amursana said he was promised.

Dawachi refused and instead attacked Amursana in 1754, forcing him to flee east to Khovd where he swore allegiance to the Qianlong Emperor of the Qing Empire. The Qianlong Emperor agreed to support Amursana's plans to defeat Dawachi, which included the retaking of Ili and neighboring Kashgar. Meanwhile, most of the Oirat Khoshut had followed Amursana and had defected to the Qing, leaving Dawachi with only the Dzungars under his control.

== The Ili Campaign ==
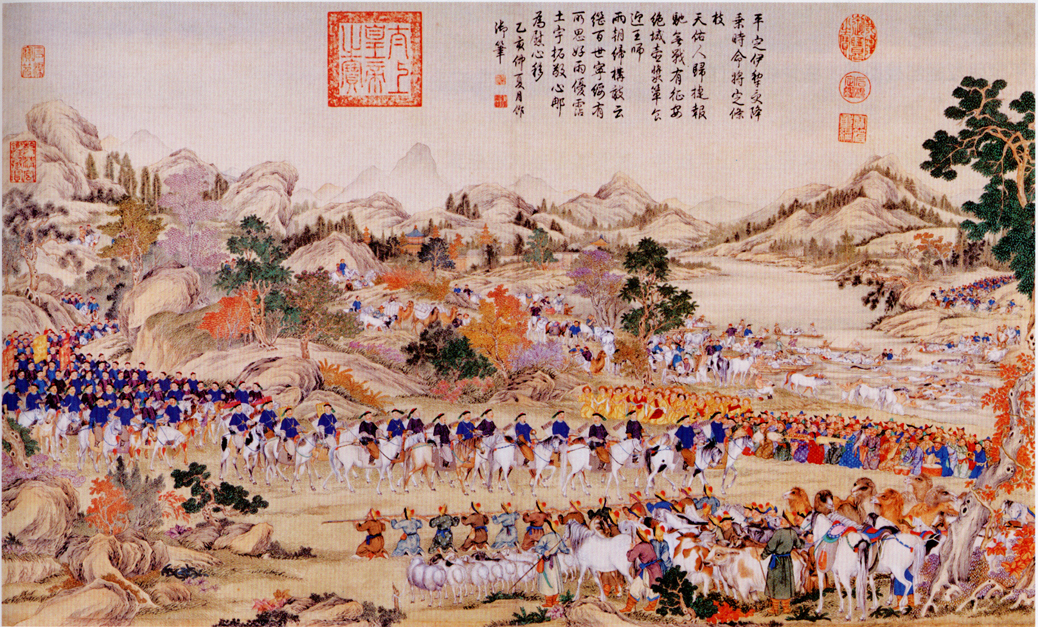
Qing troops enter Ili

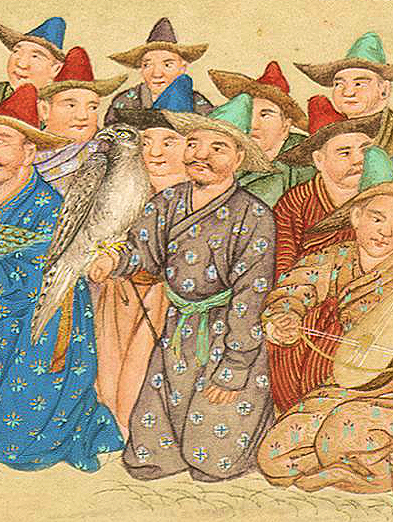
Dawachi surrendering to Qing general Zhaohui at Ili in 1755. Painting by Jesuit painter at the Qing court, Ignatius Sichelbart, 1764

Late 1754 and early 1755, in an attempt to definitively settle the 60-year-old Dzungaria problem, the Qianlong Emperor gave orders for a final advance on Ili. Approximately 200,000 soldiers were mobilized for a campaign against Dawachi. Many were Khalkha Mongols, who contributed tens of thousands of horses and mules to the effort. Amursana was made Border Pacification Vice-general of the Left of the Northern Route Army. General Ban Di took supreme command of the army, which set out from Uliastai in March 1755 and linked up with the Western Route Army under Yong Chang and Salar (薩喇勒) three months later. The combined forces reached Bortala in June 1755. Militarily, the campaign was much more successful than expected.

There were mass desertions among Dawachi's forces when they learned that Amursana was part of the approaching army. In desperation, Dawachi sent a delegation to Beijing led by his son, who expressed his father's desire to become a vassal of the Qing Empire. The Qing army did not respond and continued the campaign. After several skirmishes and small scale battles along the Ili River, the Qing army led by Zhaohui approached Ili and forced Dawachi to withdraw south west to the Gedeng Mountains where he made a last stand with his remaining 10,000 men. Dawachi's army was routed. Dawachi was captured by Hakim Beg Khojis, Muslim Governor of Us-Turfan, who sent him on to Beijing.

There, the Qianlong Emperor showed leniency, granting Dawachi a princely title and permitting him to marry a princess from the Qing imperial family. The last years of Dawachi's life were spent in Kalgan where, in 1759, he died from excessive alcohol consumption.

Dawachi House of Choros (the 14th century-1755) Died: 1759
Regnal titles
Preceded by Lama Dorji	Khong Tayiji of the Dzungar Khanate; 1753-1755	Succeeded by Amursana
