= Amursana =

Dzungar Leader

- ᠠᠮᠤᠷᠰᠠᠨᠠᠭ᠎ᠠ
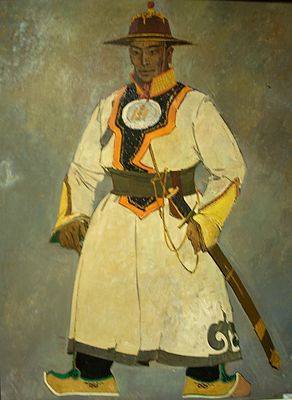
- Born: c. 1723; Dzungar Khanate
- Died: 21 September 1757 (aged 34); Tobolsk, Russia
- Occupation: Khong Tayiji
- Known for: Alliance with and revolt against Qing China

Amursana (Mongolian: Амарсанаа; Classical Mongolian: ᠠᠮᠤᠷᠰᠠᠨᠠᠭ᠎ᠠ; Chinese: 阿睦爾撒納; 1723 – 21 September 1757) was an 18th-century taishi (太师; 太師) or prince of the Khoit-Oirat tribe that ruled over parts of Dzungaria and Altishahr in present-day northwest China. Known as the last great Oirat hero, Amursana was the last of the Dzungar rulers. The defeat of his rebel forces by Qing dynasty Manchu armies in the late 1750s signaled the final extinction of Mongol influence and power in Inner Asia, ensured the incorporation of Mongol territory into the Qing Manchu Empire, and brought about the Dzungar genocide.

== Family ==
Amursana was born in 1723 to a noble mother from the Dzungar-Oirat tribe and taisha or crown prince of the Khoit-Oirat clan. Amursana's mother, Boitalak (博託洛克), was the daughter of Tsewang Rabtan, leader of the Dzungar-Oirat tribe following the death of Galdan Boshugtu Khan. She first married Danjung (丹衷), the eldest son of Lha-bzang Khan, ruler of the Khoshut-Oirat tribe. Following Danjung's death c. 1717, allegedly at the hands of his father-in-law, Boitalak married Amursana's father, a taisha or crown prince of the Khoit-Oirat clan.

== Alliance and split with Dawachi ==
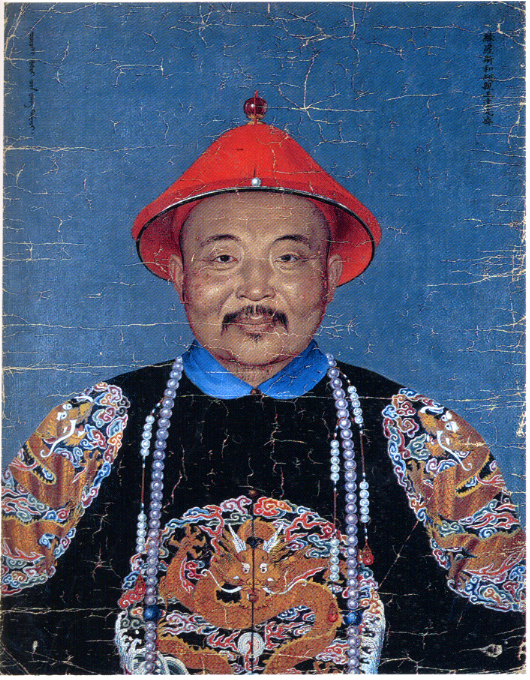
Dawachi in Manchu full dress

The Khoits ranked lower within the Oirat tribal hierarchy — their taishi answered to the Dorbet Oirats — and by the time Amursana became khan, the power of the Dzungars was on the wane. The death of Tsewang Rabtan's son Galdan Tseren and the succession of Tsewang Dorji Namjal in 1745 led to a fierce internecine struggle for Dzungar leadership. Tsewang Dorji was subsequently blinded and imprisoned in Aksu by his elder brother Lama Dorji (喇嘛達爾札; d. 1752), who then usurped the khanship. Although a Khoit, Lama Dorji's only opposition came from the Dzungar Khan, Dawachi, grandson of Khong Tayiji Tsewang Rabtan's cousin Tsering Dhondup (大策凌敦多布). In 1751, Lama Dorji defeated Dawachi who was forced to flee across the border into the Kazakh Khanate territory with about a dozen men. Amursana was one of Dawachi's few followers who returned to Tarbagatai to join up with his Khoit clansmen. With a thousand of his men, he then marched to Ili where they surprised Lama Dorji and killed him on 13 January 1752. Other sources claim that Lama Dorji was killed by his own troops in December 1752. Dawachi then assumed the title 'of taisha of the Dzungars and richly rewarded Amursana for his efforts.

As a Khoit, Amursana did not rank as part of the Dzungar Khanate's hierarchy and relied on Dawachi for influence among the various Oirat clans. Nevertheless, marriage to the daughter of Ablai Khan, leader of the neighboring Kazakh Khanate, and alliances with various Oirat clan leaders enabled him to build up enough support to call on Dawachi to divide the Khanate's lands between them. Dawachi refused and instead attacked his former ally, forcing him to flee east to Khovd. There, Amursana swore allegiance to the Qing Qianlong Emperor, bringing with him 5,000 soldiers and 20,000 women and children. He then traveled to Beijing to seek the emperor's assistance in defeating Dawachi and retaking Ili and neighboring Kashgar. Amursana's persuaded the ambitious and glory-seeking Qianlong to back his plan, in addition to granting him a princedom of the first degree (雙親王; 双亲王), which entitled Amursana to double stipends and privileges, as a bonus.

Meanwhile, most of the Oirat Khoshut had also defected to the Qing leaving Dawachi—reportedly a "drunken and incompetent" ruler—with only the Dzungars under his control.

== Capture of Ili ==
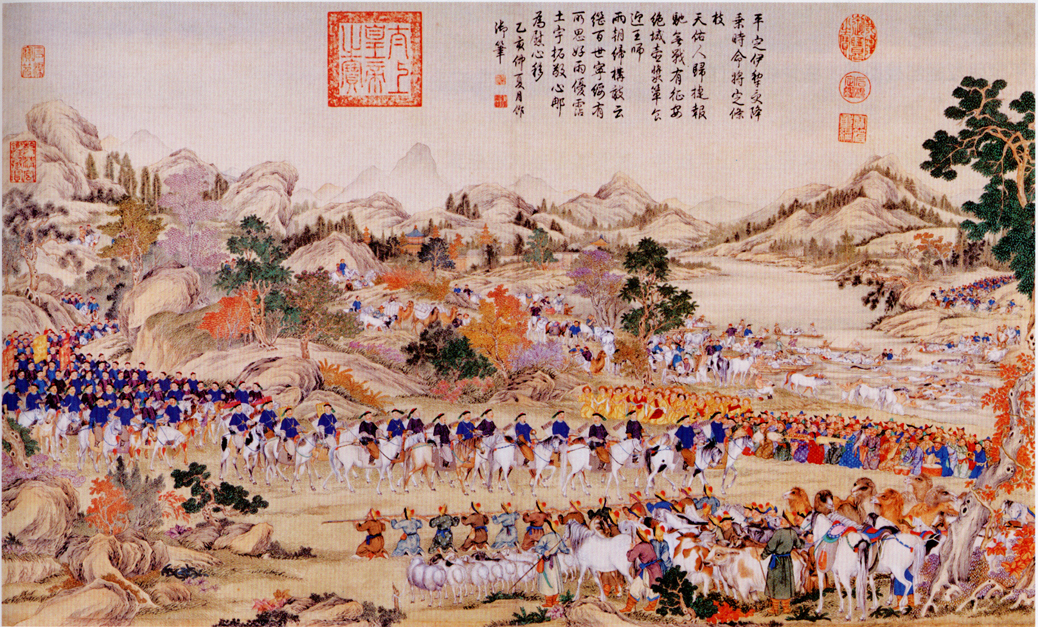
Qing troops enter Ili

Late in 1754, in an attempt to definitively settle the 60-year-old Dzungaria problem, Qianlong gave orders for a final advance on Ili. Amursana was made Border Pacification Vice-general of the Left of the Northern Route Army. General Ban Di took command of the army, which set out from Uliastai in March 1755 and linked up with the Western Route Army under Yong Chang and Salar (薩喇勒) three months later. The combined forces reached Bortala, in June 1755.

Qing forces captured Ili without a fight and Dawachi withdrew south-west to the Gedeng Mountains where he made a last stand with his 10,000 men. Dawachi's army was routed and he was captured and dispatched to Beijing. Amursana had hoped to usurp Dawachi's position as head of the Dzungars but Qianlong had already pre-empted such a move. Before the expedition to Ili had set out and fearing the rise of a new Mongolian empire, Qianlong had proclaimed that the four Oirat clans of Dzungaria would be resettled in their own territory each with their own Khan appointed directly by Beijing. Amursana spurned the offer of Khan over the Khoits and demanded to be khan of all Oirats. Amursana was instructed to return to Beijing but sensing danger, he escaped from his escort en route to the Qing imperial resort of Chengde on 24 September 1755.

== Amursana rebellion (1755–1758) ==
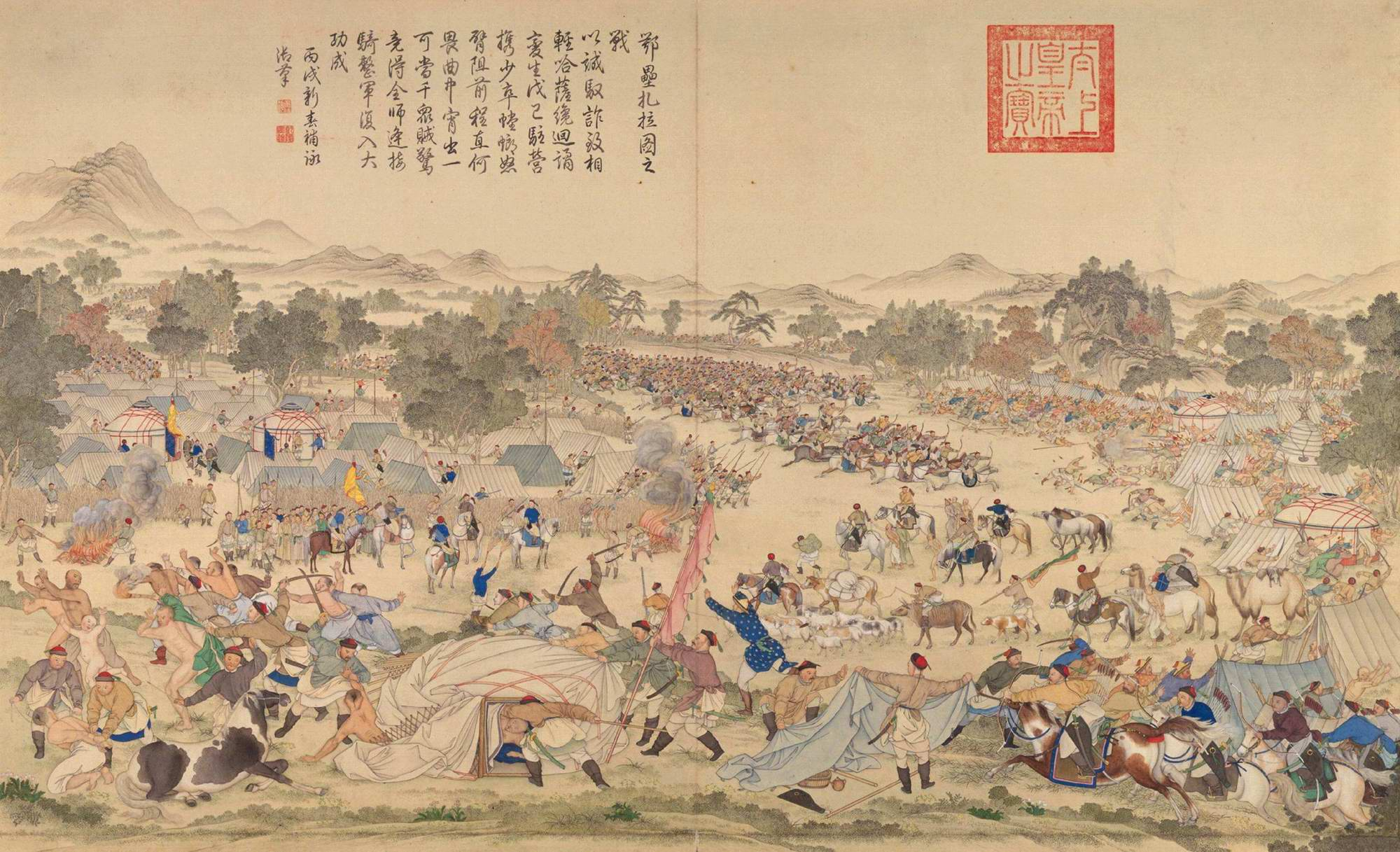
Qing general Zhaohui attacks Amursana's forces in a night battle in present-day Wusu, Xinjiang

Amursana rallied the majority of the remaining Oirats and launched his rebellion against the Qing. The Manchu armies had by now withdrawn leaving behind only a skeleton force under Ban Di. Helpless and unable to do anything, Ban Di died by suicide on 4 October 1755. For the following eight months, Amursana was the sole leader of the Oirats and the de facto Dzungar Khan.

Meanwhile, as he had promised, Qianlong appointed Khans for each of the four Oirat clans in a move designed to prevent them joining the rebellion. Qing troops were once more dispatched in late March, 1756 retook Ili. Amursana escaped and fled to the Kazakh Khanate where his father-in-law, Ablai Khan (who happened to be a descendant of Genghis Khan), refused to hand him over, despite the threat of a Qing invasion of his territory. Ultimately, this act of sheltering Amursana also triggered a war between Qing China and Kazakh Khanate, and putting the resurrected Dzungar Khanate on the side of the Kazakhs for the first time.

Qianlong railed at his generals for their failure to capture the fugitive, saying they were a waste of time and money. He dismissed them and ordered the withdrawal of all troops then appointed Zhaohui commander of a small expeditionary force that was sent to garrison Ili.

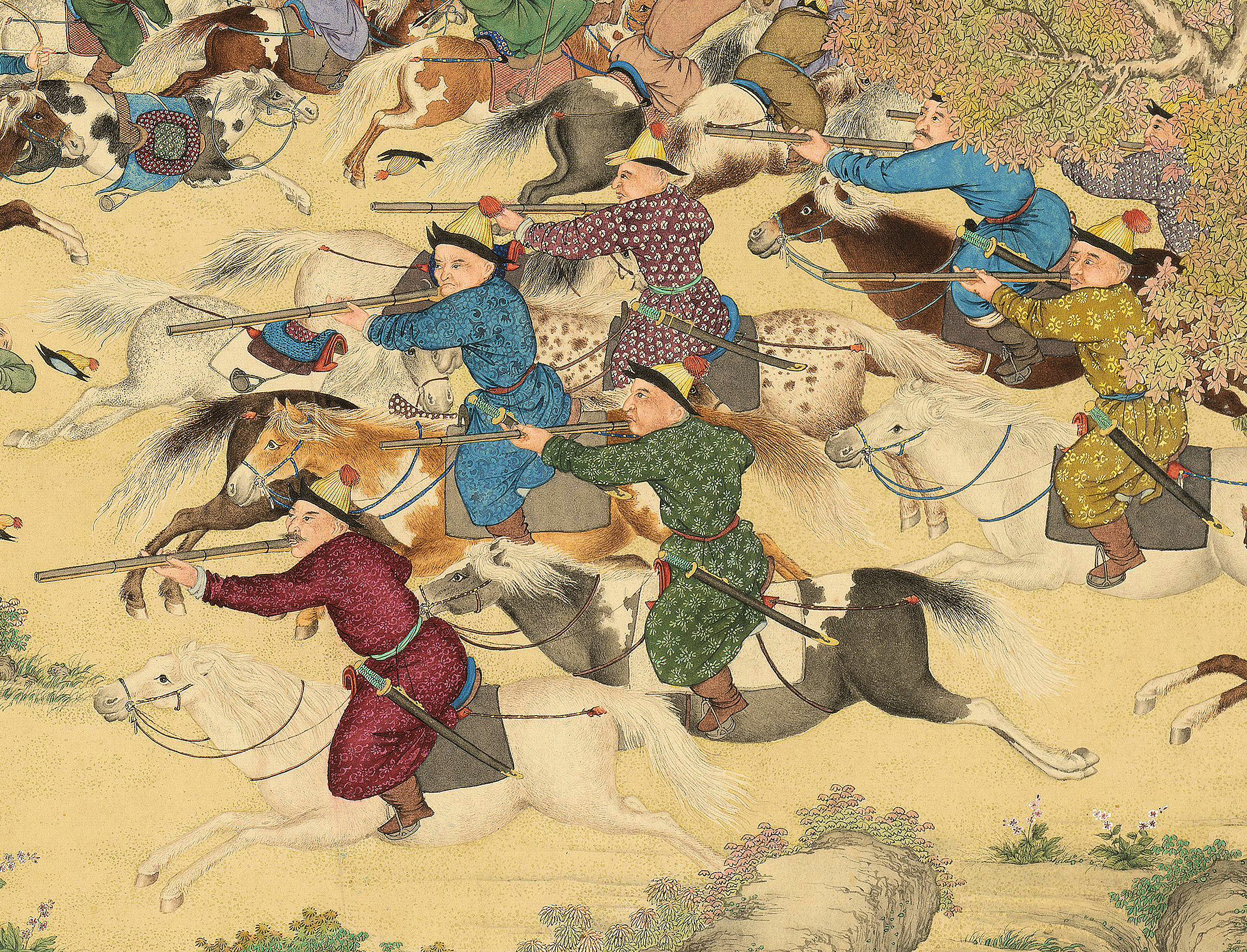
Partisans of Amursana, in the Battle of Khorgos against Qing China (1758)

Amursana returned to Ili to rally the insurgents and almost annihilated Zhaohui's forces. The hopelessly outnumbered Manchu general, despite putting up a spirited defence, was forced to retreat with 500 soldiers. The rebels cut the post routes to the capital but Zhaohui managed to fight his way back to Barkul, where he pleaded with Qianlong to take more drastic measures against the rebels.

Meanwhile, Qing attention became temporarily focused on the Khalkha prince Chingünjav, another descendant of Genghis Khan, who between the summer of 1756 and January 1757 mounted the most serious Khalka Mongol rebellion against the Qing until its demise in 1911. Before dealing with Amursana, the majority of Qianlong's forces were reassigned to ensure stability in Khalka until Chingünjav's army was crushed by the Qing in a ferocious battle near Lake Khövsgöl in January, 1757.

After the victory, Qianlong dispatched additional forces to Ili where they quickly routed the rebels. Amursana escaped for a third time to the Kazakh Khanate, but not long afterwards Ablai Khan pledged tributary status to the Manchu, which meant Amursana was no longer safe.

== Death and aftermath ==
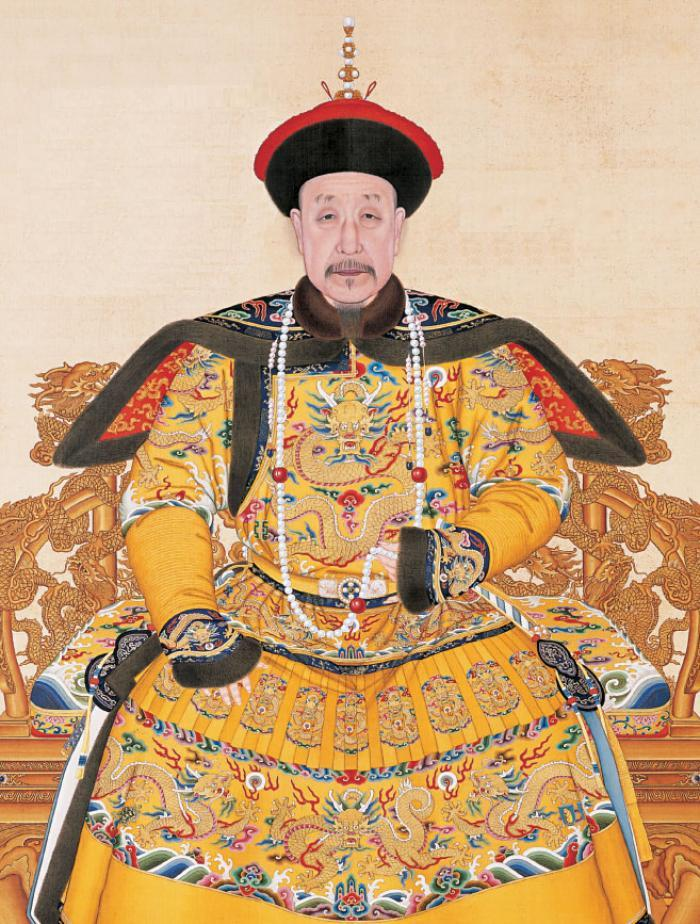
Portrait of the Qianlong Emperor

Amursana fled west to Siberia and sought asylum from the Russians at their fortress in Semipalatinsk (modern Semey, Kazakhstan). He was then taken to Tobolsk, where he died of smallpox on 21 September 1757, aged 35.

The Manchus demanded the return of the fugitive and his followers under the terms of Article X to the Treaty of Kiakhta, but the Russians hid the facts behind his flight and death hoping to gain leverage through the possession of his body. After Qing envoys were told that Amursana had died crossing the Irtysh River, they spent the next month dredging it but found nothing. After a long period of wrangling, the Russians finally agreed to ship Amursana's frozen body from Tobolsk to Kiakhta for viewing but refused a request that it be handed over for "posthumous punishment"; they instead buried it. Repeated Qing requests to St. Petersburg for the return of Amursana's corpse were rebutted by the Russians on the grounds that their amicable relations should not be upset by "a few rotten bones". Qianlong piled on the pressure: he placed Russian Orthodox monks in Beijing under house arrest and threatened to cut off trade altogether. In the end, Amursana's body was not returned. Qianlong's insistence that "The state only needs to capture Amursana. When he has died, and his body is retrieved, the entire [D]zungar affair can be called a success", failed to convince the Russians to return the body.

Qianlong's obsession with the matter appears to have been influenced by his grandfather Kangxi's treatment of the body of his arch-enemy Galdan Boshugtu Khan, whose head was placed on public display and his ashes crushed on the military parade ground in the Manchu capital.

On 18 October 1768, both parties signed an amendment to Article X of the Treaty of Kiakhta in the Russian, Manchu and Mongol languages prescribing punishments that would apply to future criminals, including defectors. However, as the border with Dzungaria had not been defined at the time of the original 1727 treaty, Amursana and his compatriots did not qualify.

== Legacy ==
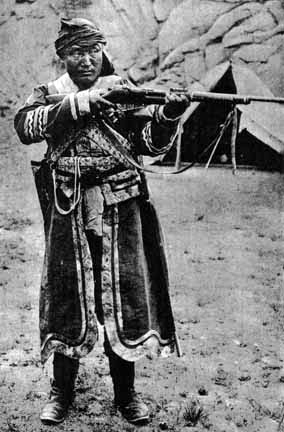
Ja Lama, who claimed to be the reincarnation of Amursana

Amursana's revolt and the subsequent subjugation of the Oirats led to the Revolt of the Altishahr Khojas (1757–1759) south of the Tian Shan range and the final Qing conquest of the Tarim Basin. The abortive rebellion also dealt the death blow to Dzungaria and the Dzungar people.

Ja Lama, who fought successive campaigns against Chinese rule in western Mongolia between 1890 and 1922, at first claimed to be the grandson and later the reincarnation of Amursana. He was also the inspiration behind the Ak Jang new religious movement.

== See also ==
- Dzungaria
- Dzungar people
- Revolt of the Altishahr Khojas

== Notes ==
1. Original Chinese: 料伊亦不敢遽爾妄行

== Sources ==
- Alikuzai, Hamid Wahed (2013). A Concise History of Afghanistan in 25 Volumes. Vol. 14. Trafford Publishing. ISBN 978-1-4907-1441-7.
- Dani, Ahmad Hasan; Masson, Vadim Mikhaĭlovich (2003). History of Civilizations of Central Asia: Development in contrast : from the sixteenth to the mid-nineteenth century. UNESCO. ISBN 978-92-3-103876-1.
- Hummel, Arthur W. Sr., ed. (1943). "Amursana" . Eminent Chinese of the Ch'ing Period. United States Government Printing Office.
- March, Patrick (1996). Eastern Destiny: Russia in Asia and the North Pacific. Greenwood Publishing Group. ISBN 978-0-275-95566-3.
- Perdue, Peter C (2009). China Marches West: The Qing Conquest of Central Eurasia. Harvard University Press. ISBN 978-0-674-04202-5.
