= Lama Dorji =

Khong Tayiji of the Dzungar Khanate 1750–1753

Lama Dorji Лам Даржаа
- Khong Tayiji

Khong Tayiji of the Dzungar Khanate
- Reign: 1750–1753
- Coronation: 1750
- Predecessor: Tsewang Dorji Namjal
- Successor: Dawachi
- Born: 1726 or 1728
- Died: 1750
- House: Choros
- Dynasty: Dzungar Khanate
- Father: Galdan Tseren Khan
- Religion: Tibetan Buddhism

Lama Dorji, or Lama Darja (Mongolian: Лам Даржаа; Chinese: 喇嘛達爾札; 1726 or 1728–1753) was a ruler of the Dzungar Khanate, a confederation of Mongol tribes that ruled over most of present-day Xinjiang and part of eastern Kazakhstan, Kyrgyzstan and southern Siberia. He was the eldest son of Galdan Tseren, Khong Tayiji of the Dzungar Khanate from 1727 until his death in 1745. Before his death, Galdan Tseren had designated his second son Tsewang Dorji Namjal to succeed him. However, a succession dispute soon erupted among Galdan Tseren's three sons.

Lama Dorji conspired with the husband of his sister Ulam Bayar, the Baghatur Sayin Bolek and other saisans or high officials (宰桑), to kill Tsewang Dorji Namjal while he was on a hunting trip. During an abortive attack on the plotters in 1750, Tsewang Dorji Namjal was captured and blinded then sent as a prisoner to Aksu, Xinjiang along with his brother, Tsewang Dashi.

Despite his low birth as a Choros tribe, Lama Dorji's encountered little opposition except from the Dawachi, grandson of Khong Tayiji and Tsewang Rabtan's cousin Tsering Dhondup (大策凌敦多布). In 1751, Lama Dorji defeated Dawachi, who was forced to flee across the border into Kazakh Khanate territory with about a dozen men. Amursana was one of Dawachi's few followers who returned to Tarbagatai to join up with his Khoit clansmen. With a thousand men, he then marched to Ili where they surprised Lama Dorji and killed him on 13 January 1753. Other sources claim that Lama Dorji was killed by his own troops in December 1752. Dawachi then assumed the title Khong Tayiji of the Dzungars.

== See also ==
- Dzungar–Qing Wars

Lama Dorji House of Choros (the 14th century-1755) Died: 1753
Regnal titles
Preceded by Tsewang Dorji Namjal	Khong Tayiji of the Dzungar Khanate; 1750–1753	Succeeded by Dawachi
