= Raid on Septenya Ulus =

The Raid on the Septenya Ulus occurred in 1741, when the Kazakhs made an unexpected raid on the Septen ulus and defeated it.

== Background ==
The third Dzungar campaign took place in the second half of 1740. Kazakh military leaders prepared their militia in advance and mounted a decisive and organized resistance against the enemy. Fierce battles continued until early 1741. In January 1741, Galdan Tseren sent his envoys to the Siberian governor-general P. Buturlin to clarify Russia's position on the Dzungar claims to the Middle Zhuz. Buturlin assured the envoys that Russia would not allow Kazakh nomads to cross the fortress line.

Taking advantage of this, the Dzungars, in late February 1741, mobilized a 30,000-strong army led by General Septen and Galdan Tseren’s son Lama Dorji. Their troops advanced in three key directions: along the Ishim River, from the Tashkent area, and from Turkestan. The powerful offensive of the Dzungar forces forced the Middle Zhuz Khan, Abulmambet, to retreat with his people to the Ilek and Ural rivers. Many Kazakh settlements were completely destroyed, with livestock and people taken to Dzungaria. Kazakh sultans and warriors, including Sultan Ablai, who commanded a reconnaissance detachment of 200 men, were captured.

== Raid ==
In 1741, fierce battles unfolded on the territory of the Middle Zhuz, including the banks of the Irtysh River. Under the leadership of the renowned batyr Olzhabai, the Kazakhs launched a raid and dealt a crushing blow to the ulus of the Oirat commander-in-chief, Septen, marking a significant success in the war.

Despite the fragmentation of the Kazakh forces, which led to defeats in certain battles and the capture of Sultan Abylai, subsequent events turned the tide of the confrontation. The Dzungar command's attempts to strike from the south ended in failure. On June 10, 1741, Yenisei Kyrgyz Kychyk Chyuganov, who had escaped from Dzungar captivity, reported in Kuznetsk: “With that Kalmyk force, the Kazakh Horde fought in the past half-winter, according to their naming, in the month of Chegan Tsara (February), and the Kazakh Horde overcame the Kalmyk force and inflicted heavy losses on the Kalmyks’ right wing.”

Batyr Olzhabai particularly distinguished himself in this war, and his descendants settled in the Bayanaul region. Folk legends and historical chronicles remember him as the victor over Galdan Tseren, whose actions played a pivotal role in defending the Middle Zhuz.

== Result of war ==
In May 1741, the last Kazakh-Dzungar war ended. Despite some victories for the Kazakhs, who were also fighting the Volga Kalmyks at the time, they suffered defeat.

However, in 1742, hostilities resumed. In the spring, the Oirats launched a campaign against the Syr Darya. As a result of the military campaign of 1741–1742, a significant portion of the territory and population of the Middle Zhuz fell under the control of Dzungaria. Sultan Abylai was captured. Sultans Barak, Batyr, and several others defected to the victors, offering hostages and promising to pay tribute. Abilmambet Khan and his inner circle were also inclined to offer their sons as hostages and pay tribute. I. Neplyuev reported to the State Collegium of Foreign Affairs that Galdan-Tseren, through his ambassadors, was demanding both hostages and tribute from Abilmambet and the noble sultans of the Middle Zhuz. Otherwise, he threatened a new war.

The Khan of the Middle Zhuz Abulmambet and the sultans Ablai, Abulfeiz, and Niyaz were also forced to send hostages to Dzungaria. The Russian lieutenant D. Gladyshev, who returned from a trip to Abulkhair in Orenburg in the spring of 1742, reported on a meeting of the nobility of the Younger Zhuz, at which a decision was made to recognize the citizenship of the Dzungar khuntaiji. Soon, the Khan of the Younger Zhuz Abulkhair also sent his son to Dzungaria.

== Sources ==
- Chimitdorzhiev, Shirap (1979). Relations between Mongolia and Central Asia in the 17th and 18th centuries (in Russian). Science. Editorial office of Eastern Literature (publishing house). p. 32.
- Kadyrbaev, Alexander (2023). "On the History of Relations between the Volga Kalmyks and the Oirats of Dzungaria with the Nogais, Turkmens, and Kazakhs in the 17th–18th Centuries". Bulletin of Kalmyk University (in Russian). 3 (59): 6–16. doi:10.53315/1995-0713-2023-59-3-6-16.
