= Tarbagatai =

Tarbagatai, Tarbagatay or Tarvagatai may refer to:

- Tarbagatai Mountains in the north-western parts of Xinjiang, China and East Kazakhstan
- Tarvagatai, a sub-range of the Khangai massif, Khövsgöl Province, Mongolia
- Tarvagatai River, in the Teshig sum of Bulgan aimag in Mongolia
- Tacheng Prefecture or Tarbagatai, a prefecture in the Ili Kazakh autonomous prefecture, Xinjiang, China
- Tacheng, sometimes Tarbagatai, in northern Ili Kazakh autonomous prefecture, Xinjiang, China
- Tarbagatay, Russia, the name of several inhabited localities in Russia
- Tarbagatay District, a district of East Kazakhstan Region, Kazakhstan

== See also ==
- Tarbagataysky District, a district of the Buryat Republic, Russia
