= Dzungar genocide =

1755–1758 extermination in Dzungar Khanate

- Part of the Conquest of Dzungaria
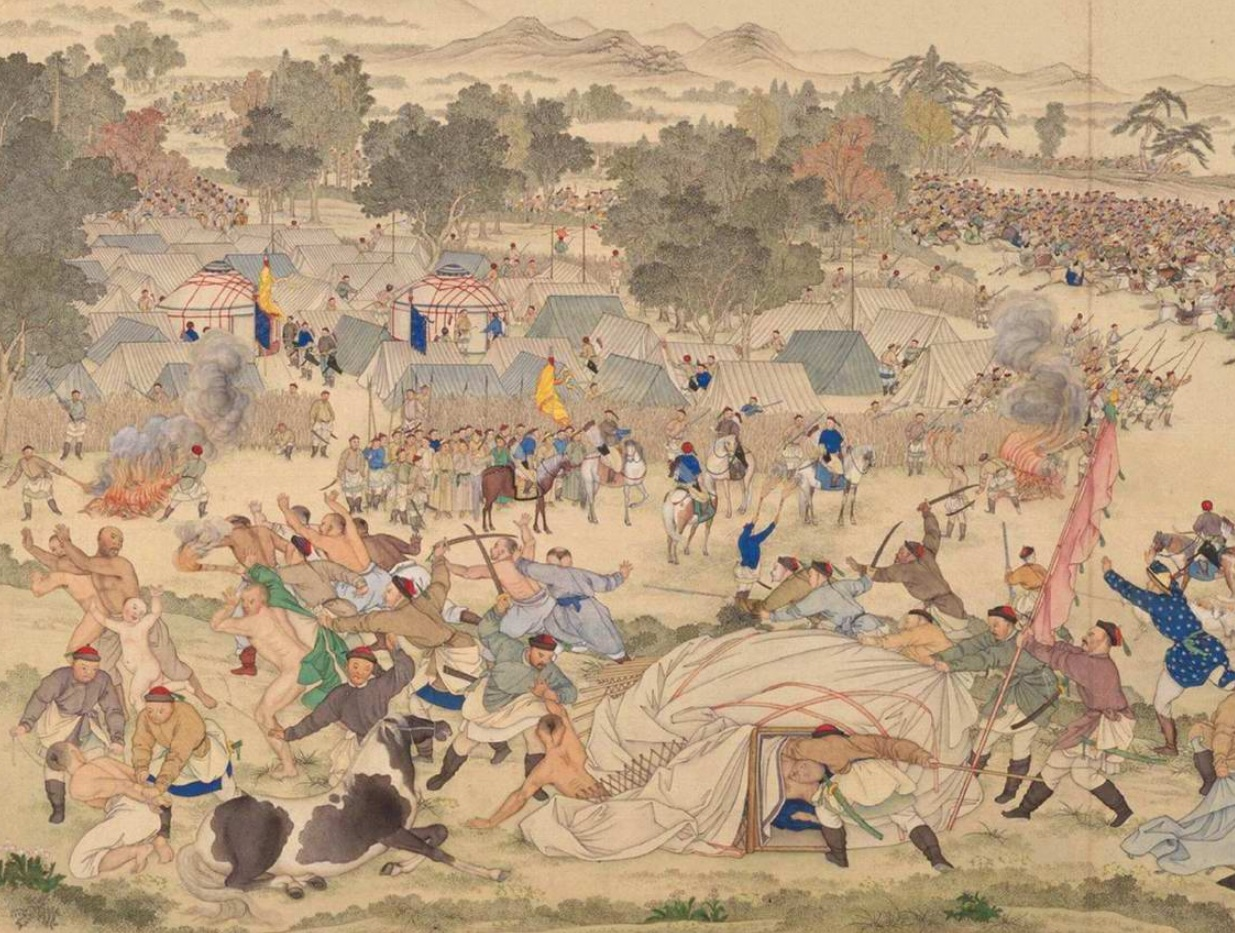
- The Battle of Oroi-Jalatu (1756). Chinese general Zhao Hui attacked the Dzungar camp at night, in present Wusu, Xinjiang.
- Location: Dzungar Khanate (modern-day Dzungaria, Western Mongolia, Kazakhstan, northern Kyrgyzstan, southern Siberia, Xinjiang)
- Date: 1755–1758
- Target: Dzungars
- Attack type: Genocide, mass murder, ethnic cleansing
- Deaths: Several estimates: 420,000–480,000; 600,000; 500,000–800,000; (70%–80% of the Dzungar population, from both warfare and disease)
- Perpetrators: Qing dynasty Eight Banners, Khalkha Mongols, Kazakhs, Uyghurs, and Hui rebels
- Motive: Anti-Mongolian sentiment, consolidation of Qing authority

The Dzungar genocide (Chinese: 準噶爾滅族; pinyin: Zhǔngáěr mièzú) was the mass extermination of the Dzungar people, a confederation of Oirat Mongol tribes, by the Qing dynasty. The Qianlong Emperor ordered the genocide after the rebellion in 1755 by Dzungar leader Amursana against Qing rule, after the dynasty first conquered the Dzungar Khanate with Amursana's support. The genocide was perpetrated by Manchu, Han, and Khalkha Mongol troops of the Qing army, supported by Turkic oasis dwellers of Altishahr, now known as Uyghurs, who rebelled against Dzungar rule.

The Dzungar Khanate was a confederation of several Tibetan Buddhist Oirat Mongol tribes that emerged in the early 17th century, and the last great nomadic empire in Asia. Some scholars estimate that about 70–80% of the Dzungar population, or around 420,000 to 480,000 people (with other estimates putting it at 600,000 to as high as 800,000), were killed by a combination of warfare and disease during or after the Qing conquest in 1755–1757. After wiping out the native population of Dzungaria, the Qing government then resettled Han, Hui, Uyghur, and Sibe people on state farms in Dzungaria, along with Manchu Bannermen, to repopulate the area.

== Background ==
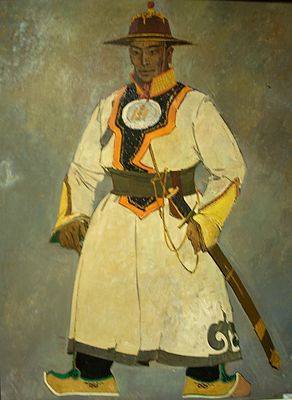
Dzungar leader Amursana

The Qing dynasty went to war against the Dzungars in the Dzungar–Qing War. The Dzungars lived in the area stretching from the west end of the Great Wall of China to present-day eastern Kazakhstan and from present-day northern Kyrgyzstan to southern Siberia (most of which is located in present-day Xinjiang). They were the last nomadic empire to threaten China, which they did from the early 17th century through the middle of the 18th century.

During this time, the Dzungar pioneered the local manifestation of the ‘Military Revolution’ in Central Eurasia after perfecting a process of manufacturing indigenously created gunpowder weapons. They also created a mixed agro-pastoral economy, as well as complementary mining and manufacturing industries on their lands. Additionally, the Dzungar managed to enact an empire-wide system of laws and policies to boost the use of the Oirat language in the region.

After a series of inconclusive military conflicts that started in the 1680s, the Dzungars were subjugated by the Manchu-led Qing dynasty (1644–1911) in the late 1750s. Michael Clarke argued that the Qing campaign in 1757–58 "amounted to the complete destruction of not only the Zunghar state, but of the Zunghars as a people". After the Qianlong Emperor led Qing forces to victory over the Dzungars in 1755, he originally planned to split the Dzungar Khanate into four tribes headed by four Khans, the Khoit tribe was to have the Dzungar leader Amursana as its Khan.

Amursana rejected the Qing arrangement and rebelled because he wanted to be leader of a united Dzungar nation. The enraged Qianlong Emperor then issued orders for the eradication of the entire Dzungar nation and name. Mongol banners and Manchus would receive Dzungar women and children as slaves. The remaining Dzungars were to be killed.

The Outer Mongol Khalkha Prince Chingünjav conspired with Amursana to revolt against the Qing in 1755. Chingünjav then started his own rebellion in Outer Mongolia against the Qing in 1756, but it was crushed by the Qing in 1757. Chingünjav and his entire family were executed by the Qing after the rebellion was put down. The Manchu Eight Banners were then ordered by the Qing Qianlong Emperor to conquer the Dzungars.

== Qing conquest of the Dzungars ==
=== Policies of extermination ===
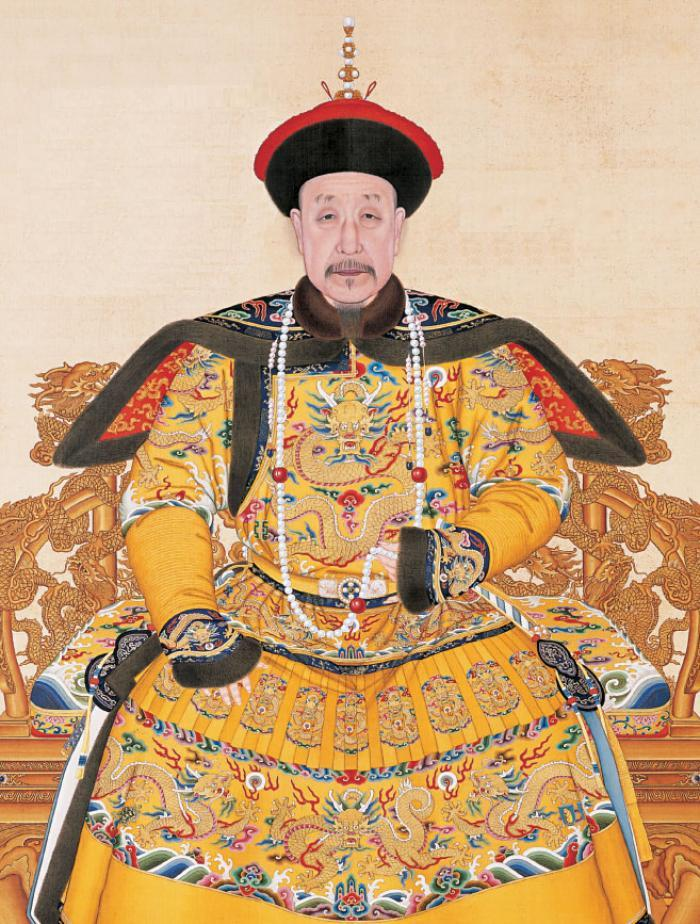
The Qianlong Emperor

The Qianlong Emperor issued the following orders, as translated by Peter C. Perdue:

Show no mercy at all to these rebels. Only the old and weak should be saved. Our previous military campaigns were too lenient. If we act as before, our troops will withdraw, and further trouble will occur. If a rebel is captured and his followers wish to surrender, he must personally come to the garrison, prostrate himself before the commander, and request surrender. If he only sends someone to request submission, it is undoubtedly a trick. Tell Tsengünjav to massacre these crafty Zunghars. Do not believe what they say.

Deaths in the Dzungar genocide are estimated at between 70 and 80 percent of the 600,000 or more Dzungars, who were destroyed by disease and warfare between 1755 and 1758, which Michael Clarke describes as "the complete destruction of not only the Dzungar state but of the Dzungars as a people". According to the Qing scholar Wei Yuan (1794–1857), the Dzungar population before the Qing conquest was around 600,000 in 200,000 households.

Wei Yuan wrote that about 40 percent of the Dzungar households were killed by smallpox, 20 percent fled to Russia or Kazakh tribes, and 30 percent were killed by Manchu bannermen. For several thousands of li, there were no gers except of those who had surrendered. According to Russian accounts, all the men, women, and children of the Dzungars were slaughtered by the Manchu troops. The population of Dzungaria did not rebound for several generations.

The destruction of the Dzungars has been attributed to an explicit policy of extermination, described as "ethnic genocide", by the Qianlong Emperor which lasted for two years. He ordered the massacre of the majority of the Dzungar population and the enslavement or banishment of the remainder, resulting in the destruction of the Dzungars. The Encyclopedia of Genocide and Crimes Against Humanity classifies the Qianlong Emperor's actions against the Dzungars as genocide under the definition given by the United Nations Convention on the Prevention and Punishment of the Crime of Genocide.

The Emperor saw no conflict between his order of extermination and upholding the peaceful principles of Confucianism. He supported his position by portraying the Dzungars as barbarians and subhuman. The Qianlong Emperor proclaimed that "to sweep away barbarians is the way to bring stability to the interior", that the Dzungars "turned their back on civilization", and "Heaven supported the emperor", in their destruction.

Capture and execution of Dzungar troops
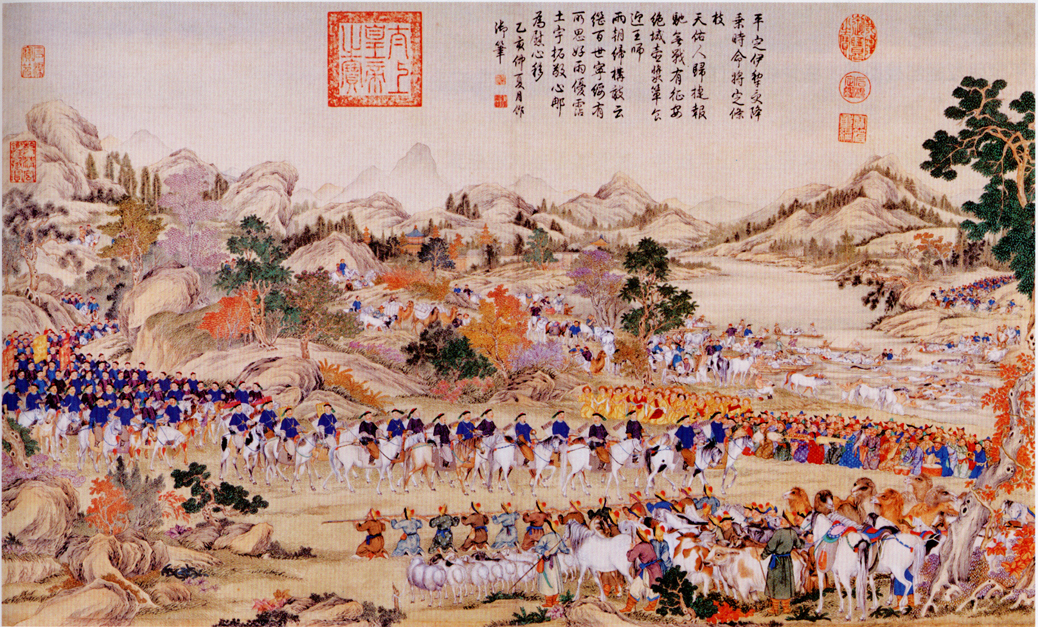
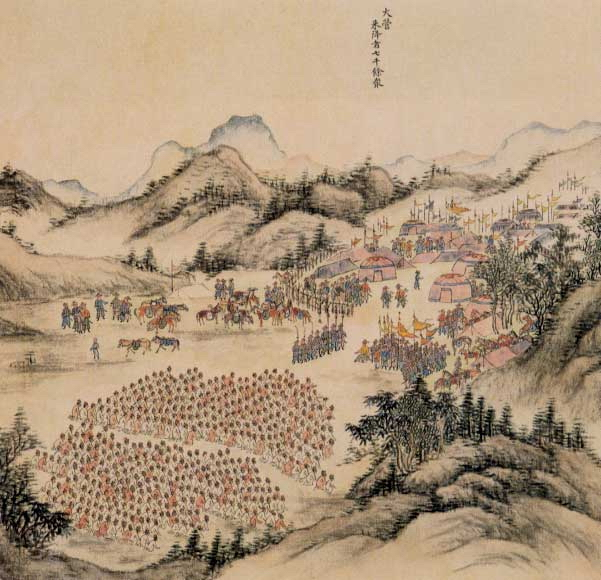
Scrolls and paintings of surrendered Dzungar fighters. Most surrendered fighters were later killed

His commanders were reluctant to carry out his orders, which he repeated several times using the term jiao (extermination) over and over again. The commanders Hadaha and Agui were punished for only occupying Dzungar lands but letting the people escape. The generals Jaohui and Shuhede were punished for not showing sufficient zeal in exterminating rebels. Others, such as Tangkelu, were rewarded for their participation in the slaughter. Qianlong explicitly ordered the Khalkha Mongols to "take the young and strong and massacre them". The elderly, children, and women were spared but they could not preserve their former names or titles.

Many Oirats fell victim to Kazakh raids and were taken into slavery. They were also enslaved by the Muslims of the Tarim Basin (modern-day Uyghurs). Loyalist Khalkhas received Dzungar Khoit women as slaves from Chebudengzhabu, and orders to deprive the starving Dzungars of food were issued. Manchu Bannermen and loyalist Mongols received Dzungar women, children, and old men as bondservants, and their Dzungar identity was wiped out. Mark Levene, a historian whose recent research interests focus on genocide, states that the extermination of the Dzungars was "arguably the eighteenth century genocide par excellence".

=== Khoja Emin alliance with Qing ===
Prior to the genocide, the Dzungars had conquered and subjugated the Chagatayan Uyghurs during the Dzungar conquest of Altishahr, after being invited by the Afaqi Khoja to invade. The Dzungar rule soon turned increasingly tyrannical, where heavy taxes were imposed upon the Uyghurs by the Dzungars, with women and refreshments provided by the Uyghurs to the tax collectors. Uyghur women were allegedly gang raped by the tax collectors when the amount of tax was not satisfactory.

Anti-Dzungar Uyghur rebels from the Turfan and Hami oases submitted to Qing rule as vassals and requested Qing help for overthrowing Dzungar rule. Uyghur leaders like Emin Khoja were granted titles within the Qing nobility, and these Uyghurs helped supply the Qing military forces during the anti-Dzungar campaign. The Qing employed Khoja Emin in its campaign against the Dzungars and used him as an intermediary with Muslims from the Tarim Basin, to inform them that the Qing only sought to kill Oirats (Dzungars), and that they would leave the Muslims alone. To convince them to kill the Dzungars themselves and side with the Qing, the Qing noted the Muslims' resentment of their former Dzungar rulers at the hands of Tsewang Araptan. Oirats were given as slaves to the Turfani Turkic Muslims of Emin Khoja by the Qing during the Qing conquest of the Dzungars.

Since the crushing of the Buddhist Öölöd (Dzungars) by the Qing led to promotion of Islam and the empowerment of the Muslim Begs in southern Xinjiang, and migration of Muslim Taranchis/Chagatayans to northern Xinjiang, it was proposed by Henry Schwarz that "the Qing victory was, in a certain sense, a victory for Islam". It was Qing rule that led to the predominance of Islam in the region, which increased after the defeat of the Buddhist Dzungars. The Qing tolerated or even promoted Muslim culture and identity, at least for strategic manipulation of the Uyghurs for a time being. The Qing gave the name Xinjiang to Dzungaria after conquering it, with 1 million mu (17,000 acres) being turned from steppe grassland to farmland from 1760 to 1820 by the new colonies of Han Chinese agriculturalists.

However, the joy of the Uyghurs was short-lived. Despite having helped the Qing Chinese to crush the Dzungars and even massacred fellow Kazakh and Kyrgyz nomads, disputes quickly flared up as the promise for autonomy of the Uyghurs was not honoured by Qianlong; in turn, it quickly broke out into the Revolt of the Altishahr Khojas and widespread Turkic Muslim unrests in Tarim Basin against Chinese rule that would continue for the next 100 years before final pacification, by force, came during the 1860s.

== Qing view of the Dzungar campaign ==
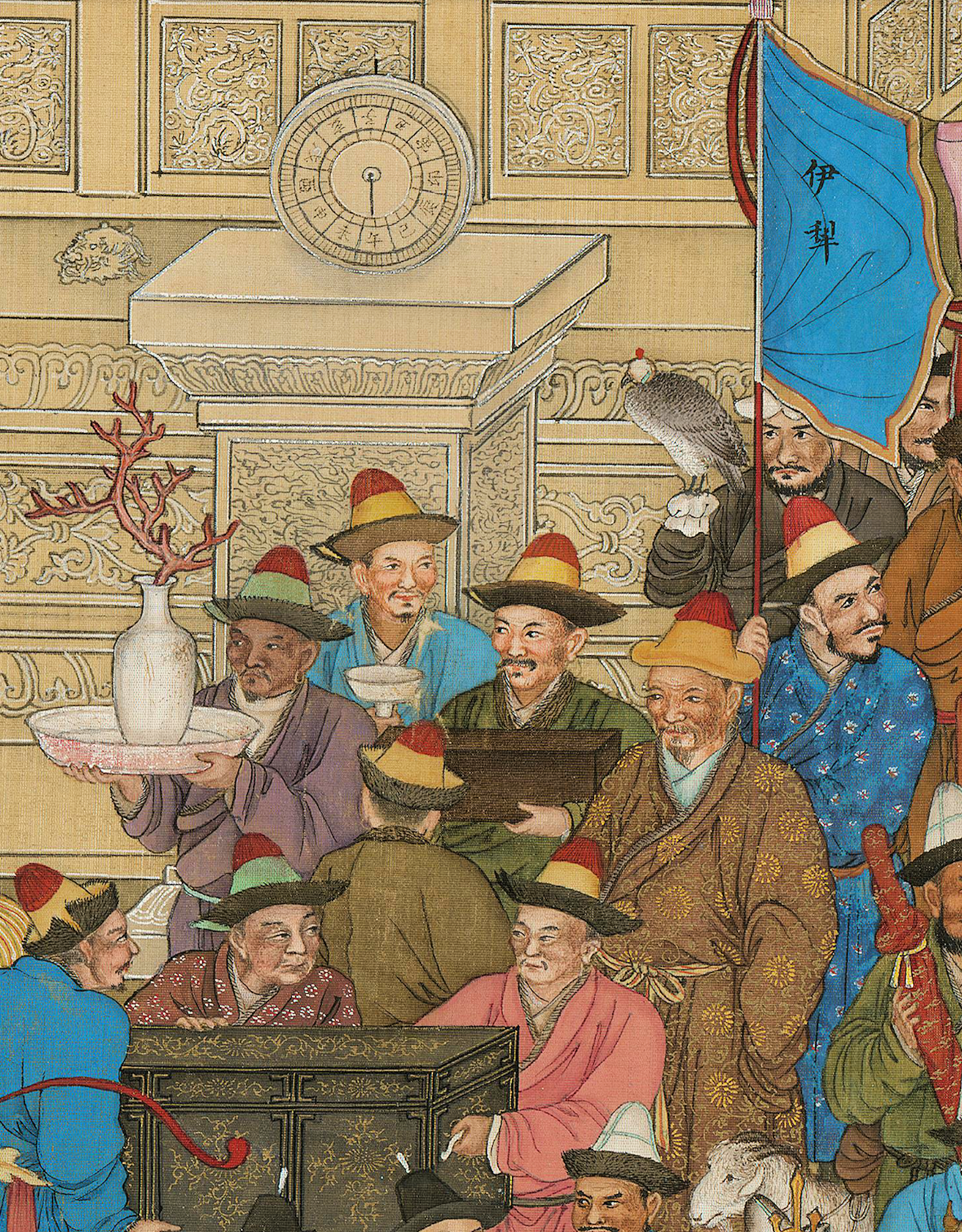
Ili delegates (flag with "伊犁") in Peking in 1761 as depicted in Ten Thousand Nations Coming to Pay Tribute.

The Qianlong Emperor commemorated the Qing conquest of the Dzungars as having added new territory in Xinjiang to "China", defining China as a multi ethnic state, and rejecting the idea that China only meant Han areas in "China proper". According to the Qing, both Han and non-Han peoples were part of "China", which included the new territory of "Xinjiang" which the Qing conquered from the Dzungars. After the Qing conquered Dzungaria in 1759, they proclaimed that the land which formerly belonged to the Dzungars was now absorbed into "China" (Dulimbai Gurun) in a Manchu language memorial.

The Qing expounded on their ideology that they were bringing together the "outer" non-Han Chinese (like the Inner Mongols, Eastern Mongols, Oirat Mongols, and Tibetans) together with the "inner" Han Chinese into "one family" united in the Qing state, showing that the diverse subjects of the Qing were all part of one family The Qing used the phrase "Zhong Wai Yi Jia" (中外一家) or "Nei Wai Yi Jia" (內外一家, "interior and exterior as one family"), to convey this idea of unification.

Xinjiang people were not allowed to be called foreigners (夷; yí) under the Qing. In the Manchu official Tulisen's Manchu language account of his meeting with the Torghut leader Ayuka Khan, it was written that, while the Torghuts were unlike the Russians, the "people of the Central Kingdom" (Manchu: dulimba-i gurun, Chinese: 中國) were like the Torghut Mongols, with the "people of the Central Kingdom" referring to the Manchus.

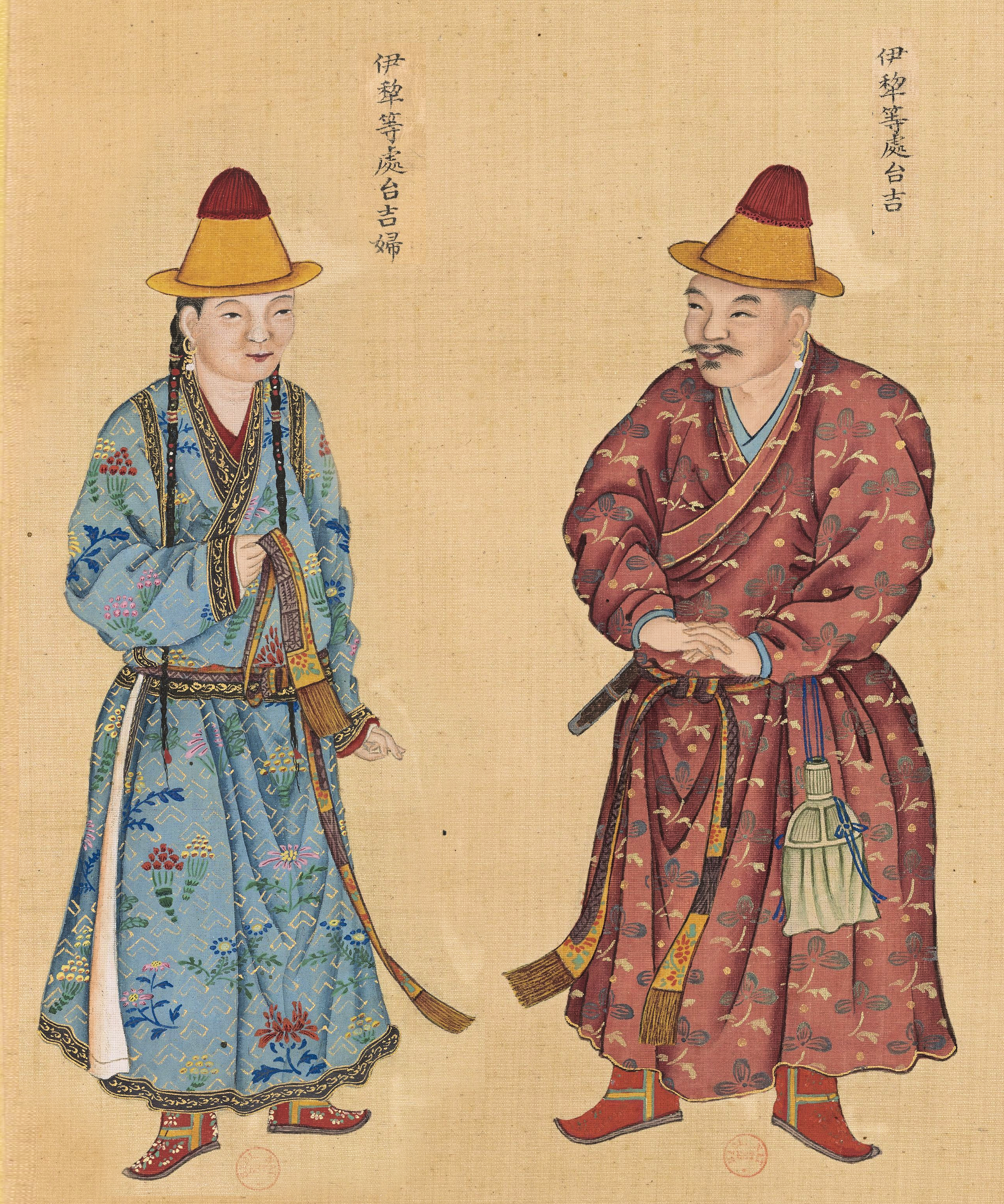
Mongol Prince (Taiji) from Ili and other regions, and his wife. Huang Qing Zhigong Tu, 1769.

The Qianlong Emperor rejected earlier ideas that only Han could be subjects of China and only Han land could be considered as part of China, instead he redefined China as multiethnic. In 1755 he said, "There exists a view of China (zhongxia), according to which non-Han people cannot become China's subjects and their land cannot be integrated into the territory of China. This does not represent our dynasty's understanding of China, but is instead that of the earlier Han, Tang, Song, and Ming dynasties."

The Manchu Qianlong Emperor rejected the views of Han officials who said Xinjiang was not part of China and that he should not conquer it, putting forth the view that China was multiethnic and did not just refer to Han. Han migration to Xinjiang was permitted by the Manchu Qianlong Emperor, who also gave Chinese names to cities to replace their Mongol names, instituting civil service exams in the area. He implemented the counties and prefectures of the Chinese style administrative system, and promoted Han migration to Xinjiang to solidify Qing control.

A proposal was written in The Imperial Gazetteer of the Western Regions (Xiyu tuzhi) to use state-funded schools to promote Confucianism among Muslims in Xinjiang, by Fuheng and his team of Manchu officials and the Qianlong Emperor. Confucian names were given to towns and cities in Xinjiang by the Emperor, like "Dihua" for Ürümqi in 1760, and Changji, Fengqing, Fukang, Huifu, and Suilai for other cities in Xinjiang.

The Qing Qianlong Emperor compared his achievements with that of the Han and Tang ventures into Central Asia. Qianlong's conquest of Xinjiang was driven by his mindfulness of the examples set by the Han and Tang. Qing scholars who wrote the official Imperial Qing gazetteer for Xinjiang made frequent references to the Han and Tang era names of the region. The Qing conqueror of Xinjiang, Zhao Hui, is ranked for his achievements with the Tang dynasty General Gao Xianzhi and the Han dynasty Generals Ban Chao and Li Guangli.

Both aspects of the Han and Tang models for ruling Xinjiang were adopted by the Qing. The Qing system also superficially resembled that of nomadic powers like the Qara Khitay (Western Liao), but in reality the Qing system was different from that of the nomads, both in terms of territory conquered geographically and their centralized administrative system, resembling a Western (European and Russian) system of rule. The Qing portrayed their conquest of Xinjiang in official works as a continuation and restoration of the Han and Tang accomplishments in the region.

The Qing justified their conquest by claiming that the Han and Tang era borders were being restored, and identifying the Han and Tang's grandeur and authority with the Qing. Manchu and Mongol Qing writers who wrote about Xinjiang did so in the Chinese language, from a culturally Chinese point of view. Han and Tang era stories about Xinjiang were recounted and ancient Chinese places names were reused and circulated. Han and Tang era records and accounts of Xinjiang were the only writings on the region available to Qing era Chinese in the 18th century and had to be replaced with updated accounts by the literati.

== Demographic changes ==
The Qing genocide against the Dzungars depopulated northern Xinjiang. The Qing sponsored the settlement of millions of ethnic Han Chinese, Hui, Central Asian oasis people (Uyghurs and Uzbeks), and Manchu Bannermen in Dzungaria. Professor Stanley W. Toops noted that the modern demographic situation is similar to that of the early Qing period in Xinjiang. In northern Xinjiang, the Qing brought in Han, Hui, Uyghur, Xibe, and Manchu colonists after they exterminated the Dzungars and other nomadic tribes in the region. As a result of these demographic changes, Xinjiang during the Qing period was made up of 62 percent Uyghurs concentrated in the south, 30 percent Han and Hui in the north, and 8 percent various other minorities.

Xinjiang, as a unified, defined geographic identity, was created and developed by the Qing (though it received the modern name only in 1884). The depopulation of northern Xinjiang led to the Qing settling Manchu, Sibo (Xibe), Daurs, Solons, Han Chinese, Hui Muslims, Salar, and Muslim Taranchis in the north, with Han Chinese and Hui migrants making up the greatest number of settlers. In Dzungaria, the Qing established new cities like Ürümqi and Yining. After the Qing defeated Jahangir Khoja in the 1820s, 12,000 Uyghur Taranchi families were deported by China from the Tarim Basin to Dzungaria to colonize and repopulate the area. The Dzungarian basin, which used to be inhabited by Dzungars, is currently inhabited by Kazakhs and Kyrgyz (who happened to be also minorities relative to Uyghurs and Hans), mostly around Ili and Kizilsu, though a small portion of Dzungar Oirat descendants still persist to even today, mainly around Bortala and Bayingholin.

While some have tried to represent Qing actions such as the creation of settlements and state farms as an anti-Uyghur plot to replace them in their land in light of the contemporary situation in Xinjiang with Han migration, James A. Millward points out that the Qing agricultural colonies had nothing to do with Uyghurs and their land. The Qing actually banned the settlement of Han Chinese in the Uyghur populated Tarim Basin oases area, and in fact, directed Han settlers instead to settle in the non-Uyghur Dzungaria and the new city of Ürümqi. Of the state farms settled with 155,000 Han Chinese from 1760 to 1830, all were in Dzungaria and Ürümqi, where only an insignificant amount of Uyghurs lived.

== See also ==
- List of genocides
- Genocides in history
- List of massacres in China
- Deportation of the Kalmyks
- Xinjiang
