= Tarbagatay, Russia =

Tarbagatay (Russian: Тарбагатай) is the name of several inhabited localities in Russia.

Urban localities

- Tarbagatay, Zabaykalsky Krai, an urban-type settlement in Petrovsk-Zabaykalsky District of Zabaykalsky Krai

Rural localities

- Tarbagatay, Khorinsky District, Republic of Buryatia, a selo in Khorinsky District of the Republic of Buryatia
- Tarbagatay, Tarbagataysky District, Republic of Buryatia, a selo in Tarbagataysky District of the Republic of Buryatia
- Tarbagatay, Zaigrayevsky District, Republic of Buryatia, an ulus in Zaigrayevsky District of the Republic of Buryatia
