= Tarbagatay, Zaigrayevsky District, Republic of Buryatia =

Village in Zaigrayevsky District, Buryatia, Russia

Coordinates: 51°45′29″N 109°16′57″E

Tarbagatay (Russian: Тарбагатай; Buryat: Тарбагата, Tarbagata) is a rural locality (an ulus) in Zaigrayevsky District of the Republic of Buryatia, Russia. Population: 30 (2010 census); 52 (2002 census);
