= Tsewang Rabtan Khan =

Khan of the Dzungar Khanate 1697–1727

- Khan

Khan of the Dzungar Khanate
- Reign: 1697–1727
- Coronation: 1697
- Predecessor: Galdan Boshugtu Khan
- Successor: Galdan Tseren
- Died: 1727
- Spouse: Lha-bzang Khan's sister Seterjap
- Issue: Galdan Tseren; Lobsangsür
- House: Choros
- Dynasty: Dzungar Khanate
- Father: Sengge
- Religion: Tibetan Buddhism
- Occupation: Military commander(1683–1727)

Tsewang Rabtan Khan

Chinese name
- Chinese: 策妄阿拉布坦
Transcriptions
Standard Mandarin
- Hanyu Pinyin: Cèwàng Ālābùtǎn

Alternative Chinese name
- Chinese: 策旺阿拉布坦
Transcriptions
Standard Mandarin
- Hanyu Pinyin: Cèwàng Ālābùtǎn

Second alternative Chinese name
- Chinese: 策妄阿喇布坦
Transcriptions
Standard Mandarin
- Hanyu Pinyin: Cèwàng Ālābùtǎn

Tibetan name
- Tibetan: ཚེ་དབང་རབ་བརྟན
Transcriptions
- Wylie: tshe dbang rab brtan

Mongolian name
- Mongolian Cyrillic: Цэвээн Равдан
- Mongolian script: ᠴᠡᠸᠡᠩᠷᠠᠪᠳᠠᠨ

Manchu name
- Manchu script: ᡮᡝᠸᠠᠩ ᠠᡵᠠᠪᡨᠠᠨ
- Abkai: Cewang Arabtan
- Möllendorff: Tsewang Arabtan

Russian name
- Russian: Цэван Рабдан
- Romanization: Tsevan Rabdan

Oirat name
- Oirat: ᡒᡄᡖᠠᡊ ᠠᠷᠠᡋᡐᠠᠨ

Tsewang Rabtan Khan (from Tibetan: ཚེ་དབང་རབ་བརྟན Tsewang Rapten; Chinese: 策妄阿拉布坦; Mongolian: ᠴᠡᠸᠡᠩᠷᠠᠪᠳᠠᠨ; 1643–1727) was the Choros prince and Khan of the Dzungar Khanate from 1697 (following the death of his uncle and rival Galdan Boshugtu Khan) until his death in 1727. He was married to Lha-bzang Khan's sister.

== Early life ==
Tsewang Rabtan was the son of Sengge, the brother of Galdan and the Khong tayiji of the Dzungar Khanate until his death on 1670 which he was killed by their half-uncles, Chechen tayiji and Zotov Batur. His uncle, Galdan mobilized to the Irtysh river, in which Galdan renounced his identity as a Lama and took revenge against Chechen tayiji and Zotov Batur. Onwards, Galdan had invaded Yarkent Khanate and the Kazakh Khanate and later invasion of the Khalkhas.

During which, Tsewang had revolted against Galdan and defecting to the Qing side on 1689, and soon consolidating himself as the Khong tayiji of the Dzungar Khanate in 1697.

== Reign ==
After his consolidation of power, he declared war to the Kazakh Khanate in 1698, in response to the Kazakhs raid — which killed Urkudei batur tayiji and 500 civilians. As he routed the Kazakh army in the Chu and Talas rivers, killing thousands and taking about 10,000 men as POW. Another war continued against the Kazakhs with ordering a detachment of Dzungars to invade Kazakhs on 1708, however the Kazakhs retaliated and went deep into Dzungaria, led by Bogembai batyr.

Later Tsewang Rabtan let Danjung (丹衷), the eldest son of Lha-bzang Khan marry to his daughter, Boitalak (博託洛克) in 1714. In the same year, he sent his son Lobsangtur and Galdan Tseren to attack recapture lost territories against the Kazakhs, in which they succeeded. He consolidated Dzungar power by 1715 with attacking recapturing city of Hami in the previous year, which was lost in 1698.

In 1716, He sent an army to 1716, to continue his war against the Kazakhs, they attacked and plundered during the campaign, however they had counterattacked on the Ili river valley. But with Kaip Khan and Abulkhair khan's disagremeents and a later campaign — the Dzungars managed to win over the Kazakhs. He also send his brother Tseren Dhondup to siege Yamyshev fortress forcing them to withdraw from huge casualty and losses.

In 1717, which the Dzungars managed to defeat the Kazakhs again on the Ayagoz river, he also sent one army of 300 into Amdo to retrieve the 7th Dalai Lama, planning to consolidate Tibetan support by bringing him to Lhasa, and another army of 6000, led by his brother Tseren Dhondup, that successfully took Lhasa from the Khoshut and killed Lha-bzang Khan. The Dzungar occupation of Tibet became more difficult to sustain as time passed, and though they managed to defeat a poorly organized Chinese invasion at the Battle of the Salween River in 1718, Qing troops took Lhasa in 1720 during their second and larger expedition.

After Danjung died circa 1717, allegedly at the hands of Tsewang Rabtan, Boitalak married a taisha or prince of the Khoid, a section of the Dzungar people, and later gave birth to Amursana (1723–1757), who would grow up to be Khan of Dzungaria during the reign of the Qianlong Emperor. Later that his forces sent earlier had managed to ravage Turkistan, although the results are disputed.

In 1719, another Russian expedition occurred, in which he sent Galdan Tseren to attack them at Zaysan lake, in which succeeded. Later, the Qing Dynasty sent a larger force to Tibet, in which removed the Dzungar occupation of Tibet and established the Qing rule in Tibet soon. After the war with the Qing Dynasty, He was now able to focus his troops unto Kazakh Khanate which he declared war and started the fifth war, in which his commander and son — Lobsangtur managed to ravage the Kazakh Steppe and form an occupation.

== Death and aftermath ==
In 1727, he died, causing a war between his two sons Galdan Tseren and Lobsangtur, which Galdan Tseren had won and killed Lobsangtur in the process and inherited the Dzungar Khanate as his successor.

== See also ==
- Dzungar–Qing War

Tsewang Rabtan Khan House of Choros (the 14th century-1755) Died: 1727
Regnal titles
Preceded by Galdan Boshugtu Khan	Khan of the Dzungar Khanate; 1697–1727	Succeeded by Galdan Tseren
