= Khoid =

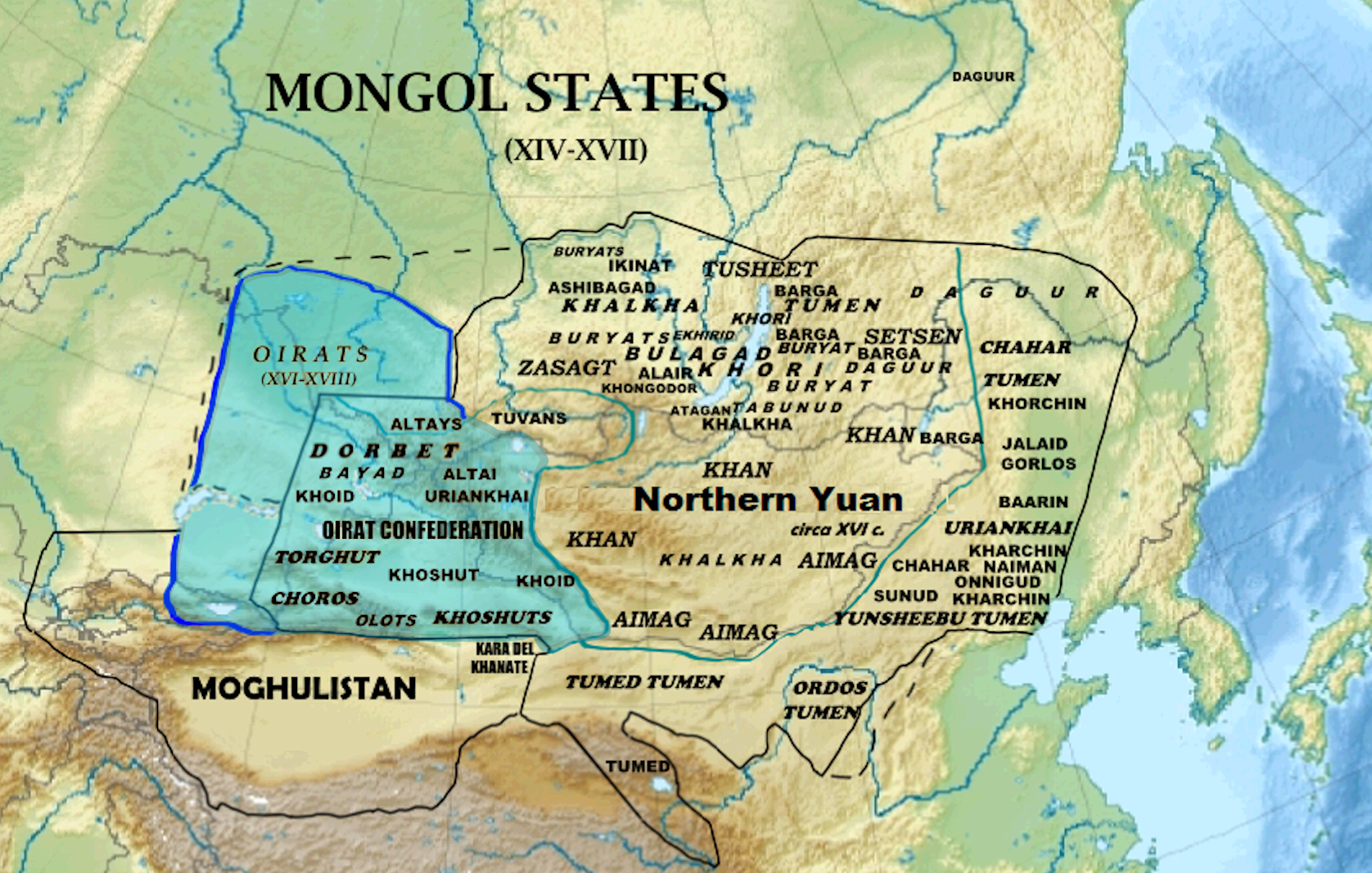
- Location of the Khoid in the Oirat Confederation

Regions with significant populations
- Mongolia: 5 000
- China: 15 000
- Kalmykia: a few thousands?

Languages
- Oirat dialect

Religion
- Tibetan Buddhism, Mongolian shamanism

Related ethnic groups
- Mongols, especially Oirats

The Khoid, also Khoyd or Khoit (Chinese: 辉特; "Northern ones/people") people are an Oirat subgroup of the Choros clan. Once one of largest tribes of the Oirats.

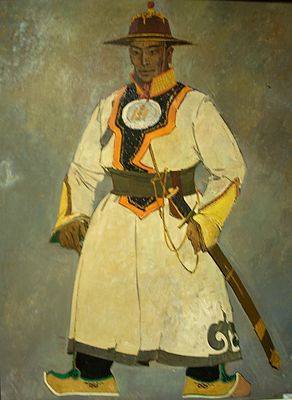
Amursana was a Khoid Oirat

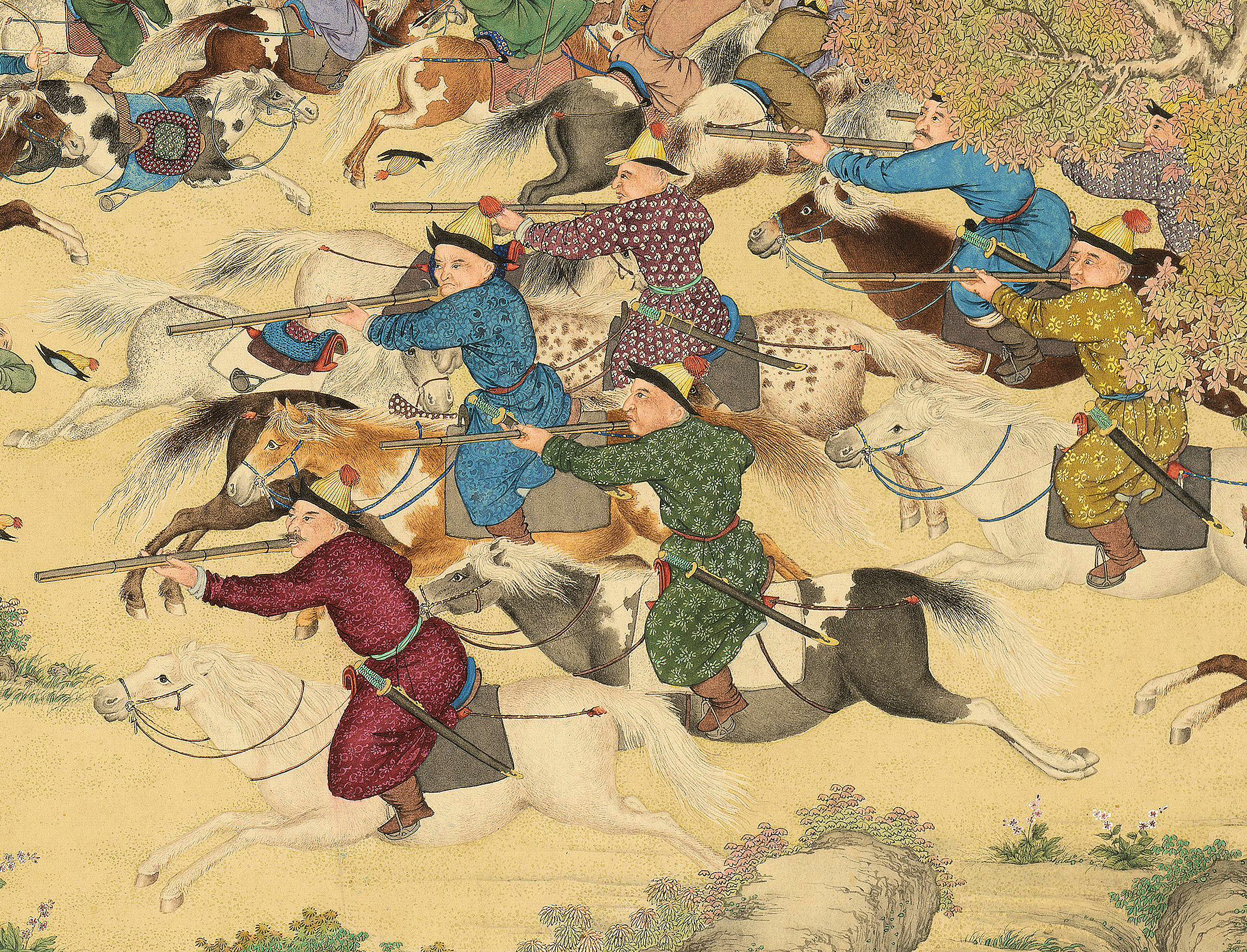
Partisans of Amursana, in the Battle of Khorgos against Qing China (1758)
