= Tsewang Dorji Namjal =

Khong Tayiji of the Dzungar Khanate 1745–1750

Tsewang Dorji Namjal Цэвээндоржнамжил
- Khong Tayiji

Khong Tayiji of the Dzungar Khanate
- Reign: 1745–1750
- Coronation: 1745
- Predecessor: Galdan Tseren Khan
- Successor: Lama Dorji
- Born: 1732
- Died: 1750 (aged 17–18)
- House: Choros
- Dynasty: Dzungar Khanate

Tsewang Dorji Namjal (Note: Mongolian: ᠴᠡᠸᠡᠩᠳᠣᠷᠵᠢ ᠨᠠᠮᠵᠠᠯ Цэвээндоржнамжил; Chinese: 策妄多尔济·那木扎尔) (1732–1750) was the ruler of the Dzungar Khanate, which covered most of present-day Xinjiang and part of eastern Kazakhstan, Kyrgyzstan and southern Siberia.

== Background ==
Tsewang Dorji Namjal became khan on the death of his father, Galdan Tseren in 1745. The Khanate was in political, military and economic terms an important power in Central Asia. Since 1739 there had been a form of peace with the Chinese Qing dynasty. As a result, trade opportunities between Dzungaria and China expanded significantly and had a positive impact on the economic base of the Khanate. Galdan Tseren had implemented modern irrigation systems in the fertile oases of his empire by bringing in Turkic Taranchi people who possessed the requisite skills for such innovations. He also improved trade and productivity in the local economy.

In the last years of Galdan Tseren era there was talk of increasing tension with Imperial Russia, but bipartisan relations were not beyond repair; an influential faction within the Russian political elite saw the maintenance of an independent khanate in Dzungaria as an important counterbalance to Chinese influence on the southeastern border with Siberia.

In the period after the death of Galdan Tseren an unprecedented internal power-struggle broke out within the Khanate, which resulted in total anarchy and its eventual destruction.

== Succession ==
Galdan Tseren had three sons and a daughter. At his death, the eldest son Lama Dorji (d. 1752) was 17 years old, the middle son, Tsewang Dorji Namjal, 13 years old and the youngest son, Tsewang Dashi just seven years old.

In his will Galdan Tseren determined that it should be Tsewang Dorji Namjal who succeeded him. In 1746, he was also proclaimed by the nobility of the Dzungars as their new leader.

Little is known about Tsewang Dorji Namjal. However, available sources describe him as someone who was seen in his youth as a perverse, cruel and paranoid man who drank copious amounts of alcohol and was "more interested in killing dogs than attending to affairs of state". According to one source, "The king's favorite ways were to roam around in the villages, drinking chang, seducing girls and indulging in carnal pleasures".

== Decline in power and death ==
Several missions to Tibet had depleted Tsewang Dorji Namjal's influence amongst the Dzungarian elite. At the same time, his elder brother Lama Dorji conspired with their sister Ulam Bayar's husband, the Baghatur Sayin Bolek and other saisans or high officials (宰桑), to kill Tsewang Dorji Namjal while he was on a hunting trip. During an abortive attack on the plotters, Tsewang Dorji Namjal was captured and blinded then sent as a prisoner to Aksu, Xinjiang along with his brother, Tsewang Dashi. He died in 1750.

== Notes ==
1. A type of barley beer

Tsewang Dorji Namjal House of Choros (the 14th century-1755) Died: 1750
Regnal titles
Preceded by Galdan Tseren	Khong Tayiji of the Dzungar Khanate; 1745–1750	Succeeded by Lama Dorji
