= Khong Tayiji =

Title of Mongolian nobility

Khong Tayiji (Mongolian: ᠬᠤᠩ
ᠲᠠᠶᠢᠵᠢ, хун тайж; simplified Chinese: 浑台吉; traditional Chinese: 渾台吉; pinyin: Húntáijí), also spelled Qong Tayiji, was a title of the Mongols, derived from the Chinese term Huangtaizi (皇太子; "crown prince").

At first it also meant crown prince in the Mongolian language. It was originally given only to descendants of Genghis Khan. In the Mongol tradition, a khan was unable to appoint the successor, instead the successor was elected in the kurultai after the khan's death. However, Kublai Khan (who founded the Yuan Dynasty) broke this tradition and installed his second son Zhenjin (Chingem) as Crown Prince. After Chingem died in 1286, the seal of the Crown prince was passed to Chingem's third son Temür in 1293. However, Temür was never formally appointed as the Crown Prince and still not the definite successor. He was only confirmed as successor in a kurultai held after Kublai's death.

The Khong Tayiji became sub-Khan when Altan Khan of the Tümed tümen installed the Khong Tayiji as assistant khan.

In 1630s the head of the Dzungars was given the title of Baatur Khong Tayiji by the 5th Dalai Lama. Thereafter the style "Khong Tayiji" was adopted by Dzungar leader Tsewang Dorji Namjal, son of Galdan Tseren. As the Dzungars got stronger, the title rose in importance. By the mid-18th century it was ranked higher than that of khan among the Oirats.

== See also ==
- Jasagh
- Mongolian nobility
