= Galdan Tseren Khan =

Khan of the Dzungar Khanate 1727–1745

Galdan Tseren Khan Галдан Цэрэн Хаан
- Khan
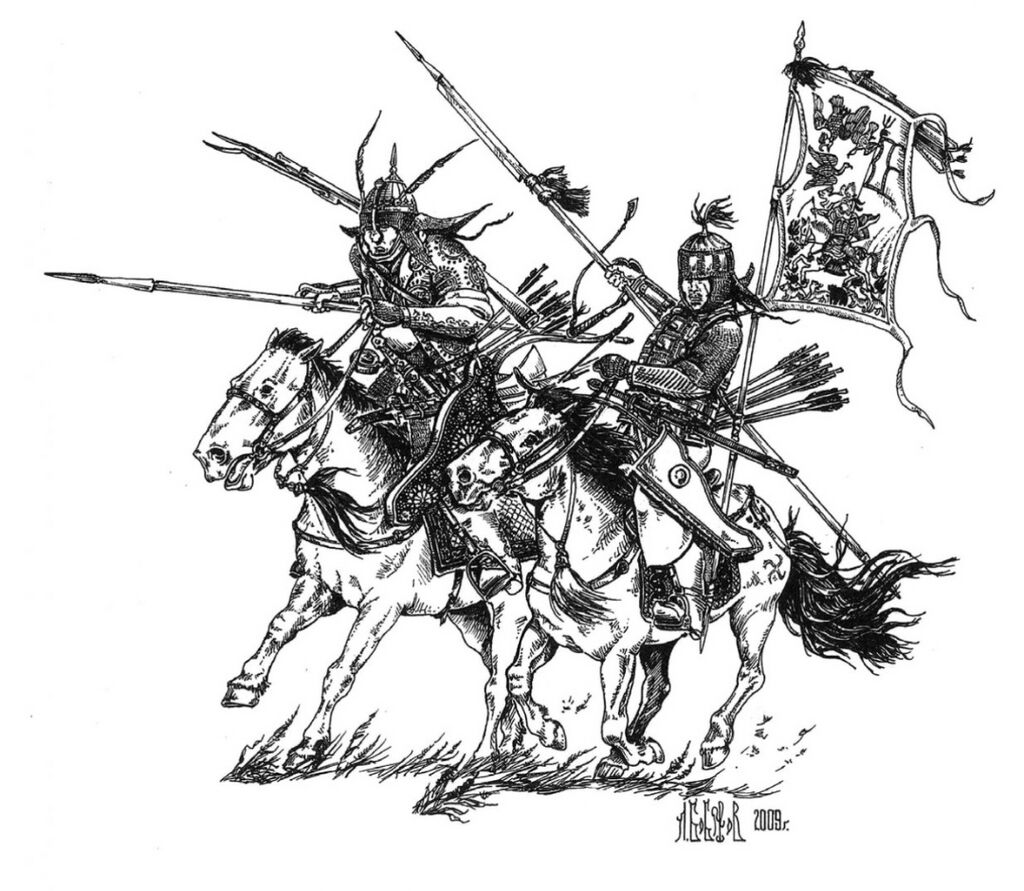
- The Dzungar army during his rule.

Khan of the Dzungar Khanate
- Reign: 1727–1745
- Coronation: 1727
- Predecessor: Tsewang Rabtan
- Successor: Tsewang Dorji Namjal
- Born: 1693
- Died: 1745 (aged 51–52)
- Issue: Lama Dorji; Tsewang Dorji Namjal; Tsewang Dashi; Ulam Bayar
- House: Choros
- Dynasty: Dzungar Khanate
- Father: Tsewang Rabtan
- Mother: Gonggara
- Religion: Tibetan Buddhism

Galdan Tseren Khan (Mongolian: Галдан Цэрэн Хаан; Chinese: 噶爾丹策零; 1693–1745) was a Choros–Khoshut prince and the Khan of the Dzungar Khanate from 1727 until his death in 1745.

Galdan Tseren was the eldest son of Tsewang Rabtan and the Sister of Lha-bzang Khan, Gonggara. After the assassination of his father by rival factions, a civil war followed between Galdan Tseren's half brother, Lobsangsür of which Galdan Tseren emerged victorious and crowned himself the new Dzungar Khan.

== Reign ==
After coronation, Galdan Tseren continued his fathers policies of confrontation with the Qing dynasty. He refused to surrender Lobsang Danjing, the leader of the revolt of the Kokonor Khoshuts of 1723, and he led a campaign against the Khalkha Mongols, the vassal of the Qing dynasty.

In the spring of 1729, war broke out against the Qing dynasty and Galdan Tseren's forces obtained numerous victories against the Qing. The war dragged on until 1739. Peace negotiations had already started in 1734. According to Dai, in 1737 both sides finally made peace and the Galdan Tseren accepted the condition of tributary. However, Arthur states that in 1739 the peace treaty formed Dzungar–Qing border on the Altai Mountains and the Uvs Lake.

Galdan Tseren not only viewed war as the only medium to strengthen his kingdom, he also worked to improve its economic and technological base. On his campaigns he captured many learned men and put them to work for the benefit of his state. Turkic oasis dwellers worked on developing irrigation projects for agriculture, he built factories to produce velvet, paper and cloth.

Galdan Tseren possessed a powerful army of 80,000–100,000 cavalrymen, all armed with firearms and with sufficient mounts. He also developed his own small military industry with the help of captured officers like the Swedish Johan Gustaf Renat.

But the base of Galdan Tseren's finances lay in the profits gained from his control of the trade route between Russia and Qing dynasty, the well known Tea Road, along which valuable Chinese products flowed to Moscow.

Galdan Tseren died in 1745, the Dzungar Khanate that he had strengthened would fall prey to a succession dispute among his three sons, and would later be defeated and subject to genocide by the Qing Qianlong Emperor.

== Issue ==
Galdan Tseren had the following children:

Sons

- Lama Dorji
- Tsewang Dorji Namjal
- Tsewang Dashi

Daughter

- Ulam Bayar

== See also ==
- Dzungar–Qing War

Galdan Tseren Khan House of Choros (the 14th century-1755) Born: 1693 Died: 1745
Regnal titles
Preceded by Tsewang-Rabtan	Khan of the Dzungar Khanate; 1727–1745	Succeeded by Tsewang Dorji Namjal
