= Choros (Oirats) =

Noble clan of Oirat-Mongols

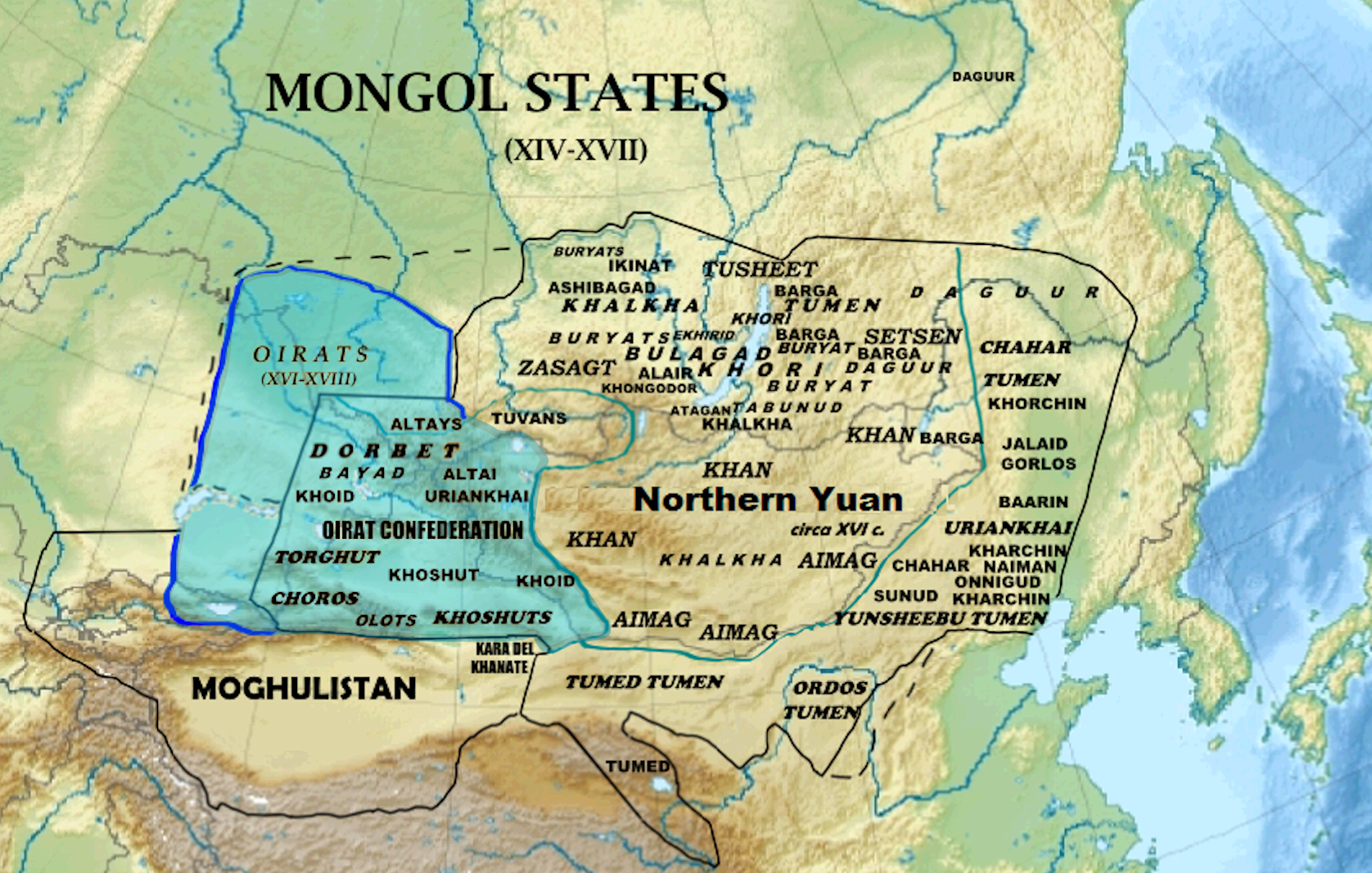
Location of the Choros in the Oirat Confederation.

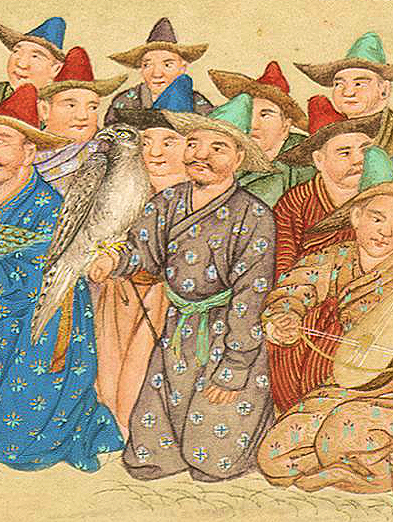
The Choros Oirat leader Dawachi surrendering to Qing general Zhaohui at Ili in 1755. Painting by Jesuit painter at the Qing court, Ignatius Sichelbart, 1764

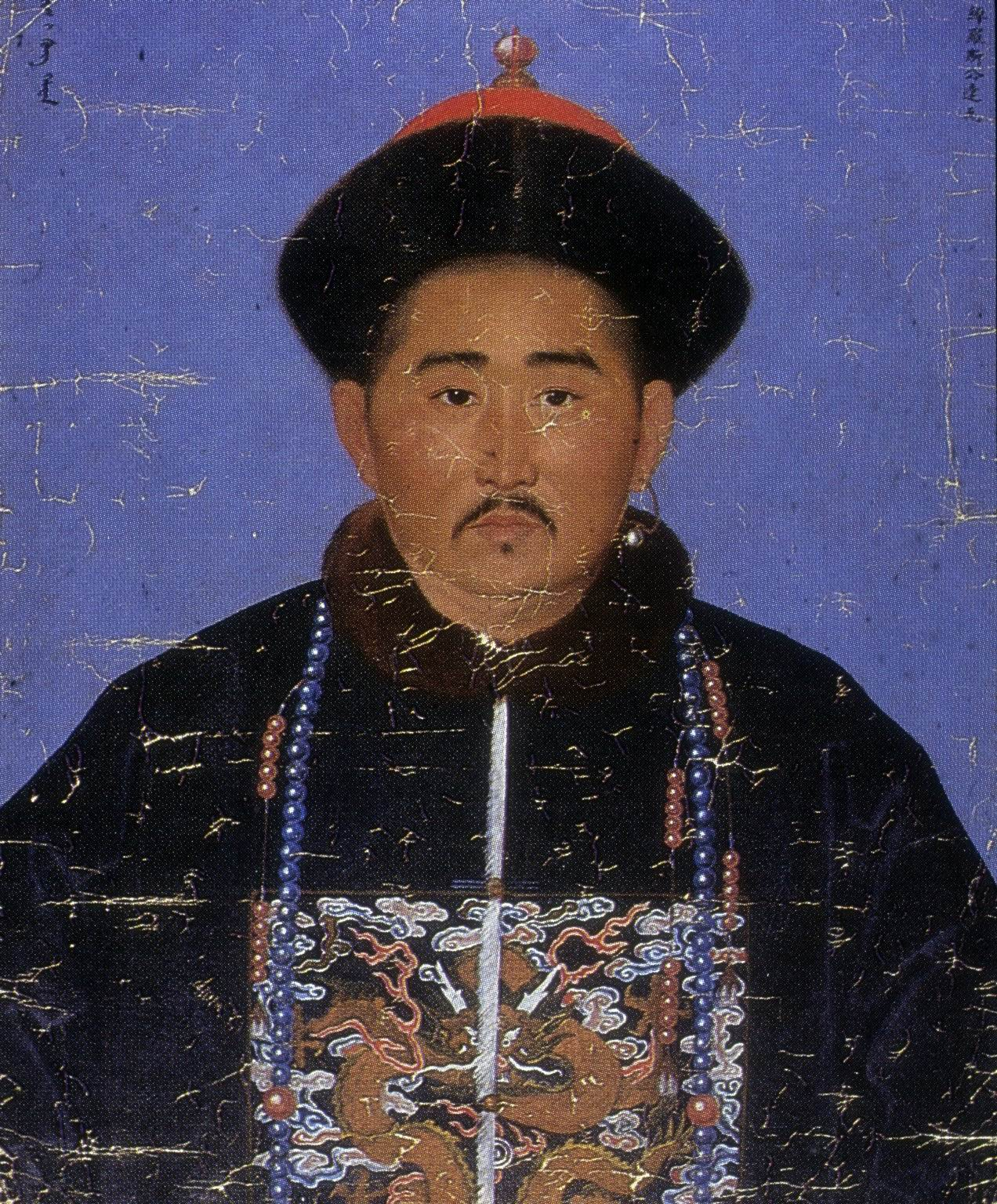
The Choros Dawa (达瓦) in Qing costume, after the Dzungar-Qing War.

Choros (Note: English: /ˈtʃɔːrəs/ CHOR-əs; Classical Mongolian: ᠴᠣᠷᠣᠰ [ˈtʃʰorŏs]; Khalkha Mongolian: Цорос [tsʰɔ́rəs]; Chinese: 綽羅斯; pinyin: Chuòluósī) was the ruling clan of the Ööld and Dörbet Oirat and once ruled the whole Four Oirat. They founded the Dzungar Khanate in the 17th century. Their chiefs reckoned their descent from a boy nourished by a sacred tree.

== History ==
In the late 14th century, the Oirats emerged as the dominant power opposing the Khalkha Mongols. The ruling clan of the Four Oirat was Choros at the time. Under their leadership, the Western Mongols established Dzungar Khanate.

In 1455 other Oirat tribes overthrew the Choros Khan, Esen Taishi, who had enthroned himself Khagan of the Mongols. About 1620 the Choros scattered after bitter fighting with the Altan Khan of the Khalkha. The Khalkha and southwestern Inner Mongolian princes repeatedly raided them from 1552 to 1628, forcing them to migrate further west. Some of the Choros fled with a group of the Dörbet Oirat northward into Siberia and present-day Barnaul. But they crushed the Khalkha Altan Khan; and made an alliance with the northern Khalkhas in 1640.

By 1690 three Oirat states had emerged: the Khoshut, the Kalmyk and the Dzungar khanates. The majority of the Choros with the Dörbet and the Khoids settled in the region of the Black Irtysh, the Ulungur River, the Emil River, and the Ili River, forming the Dzungar Khanate. The Dzunghar Khanate was ruled by the Dörbet and the Choros, displacing the Khoshut in from their homeland Dzungaria. Although they reached their peak in the late 17th century, they began to disintegrate after Galdan Boshugtu Khan's wars with the Qing. The Choros were defeated in 1697 and 1771 and they were annexed by the Qing dynasty.

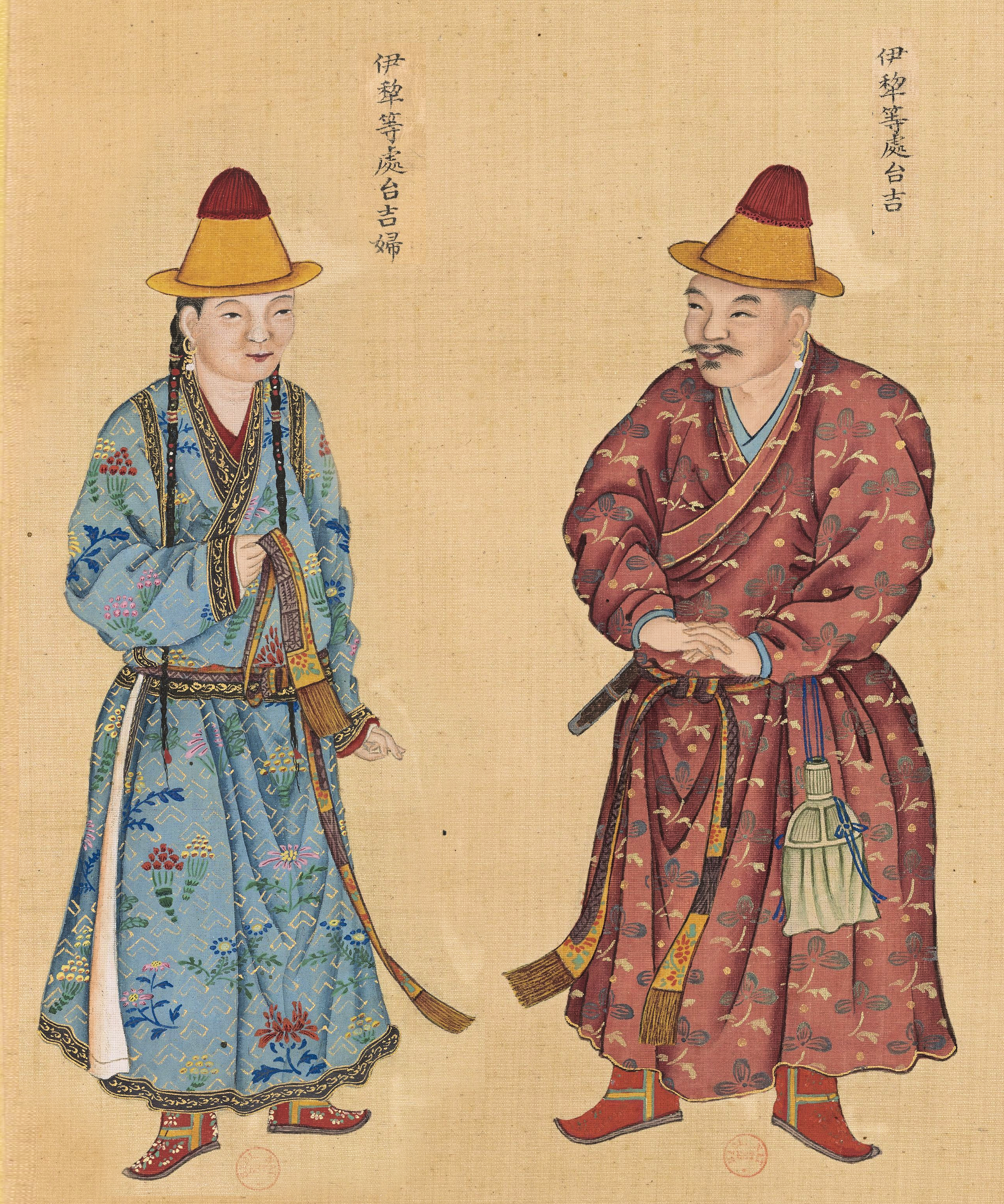
Oirat Choros Prince (Taiji, Chinese: 台吉) from Ili, and his wife. Huang Qing Zhigong Tu, 1769.

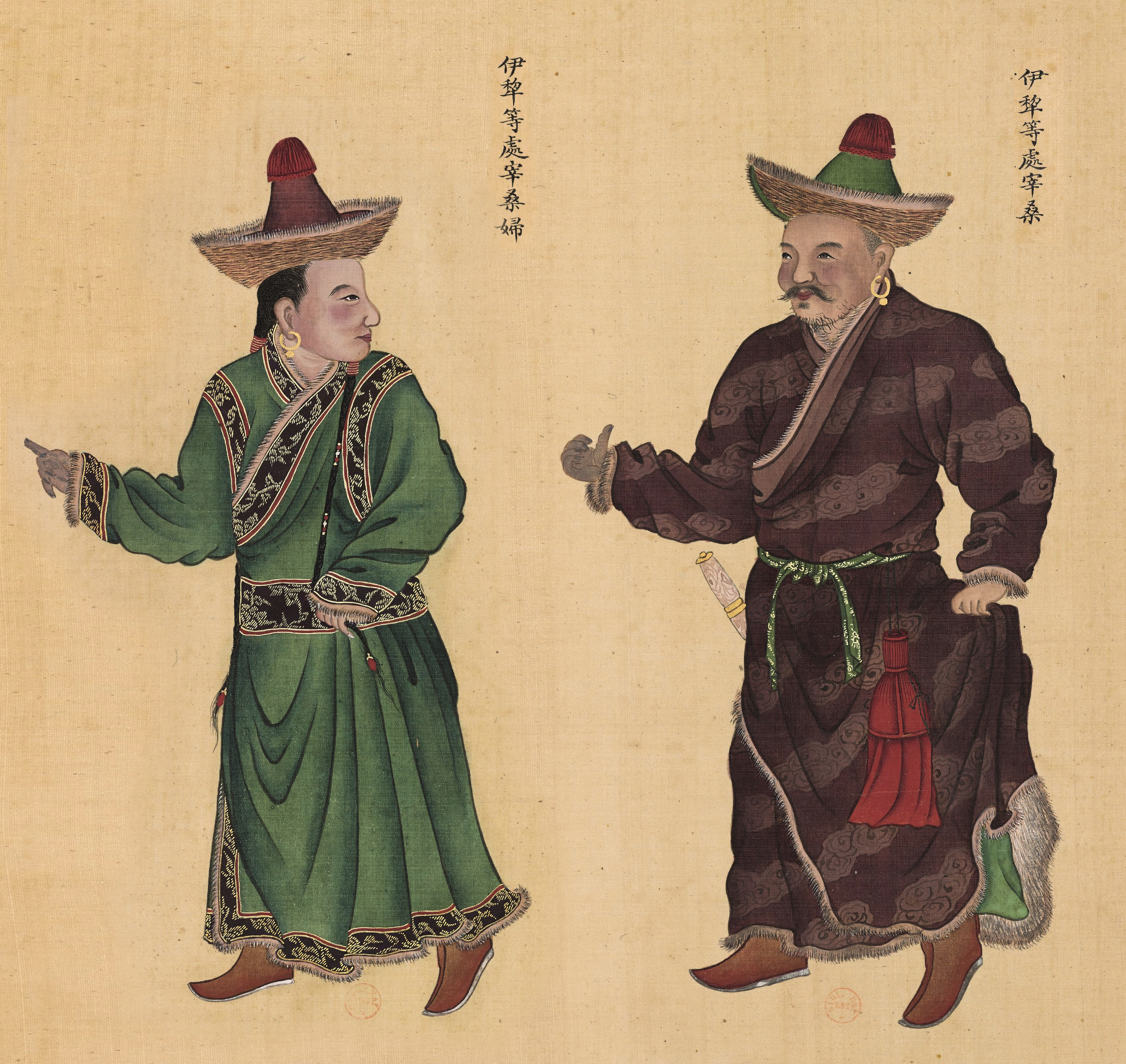
Oirat Choros tribal leader (Zaisang, 宰桑) from Ili, with his wife. Huang Qing Zhigong Tu, 1769.

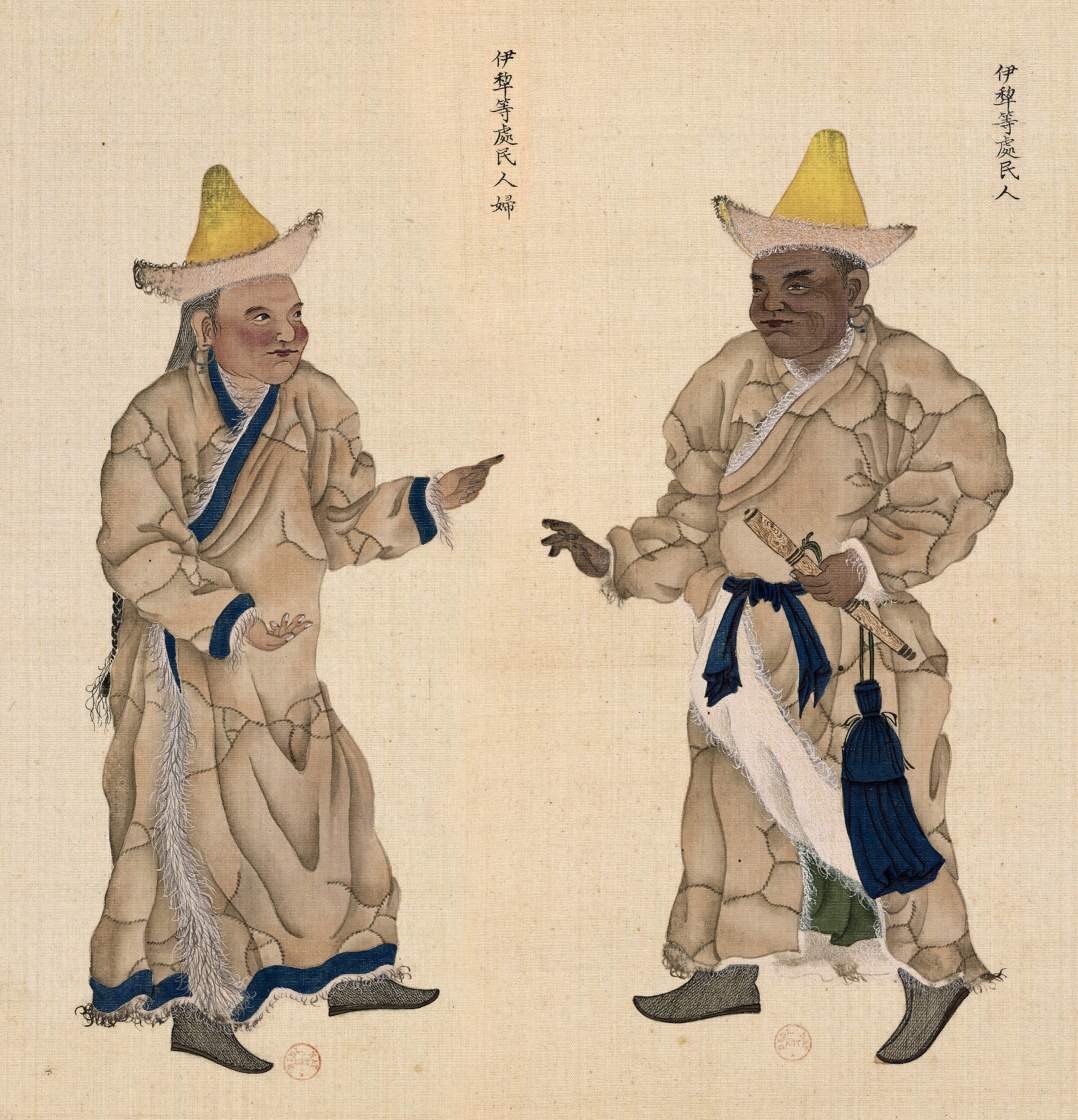
Oirat Choros commoners from Ili region. Huang Qing Zhigong Tu, 1769.
