= Dzungar Khanate =

1634–1758 Oirat Mongolic Khanate in Dzungaria

Dzungar Khanate ᠵᠡᠭᠦᠨᠭᠠᠷ ᠬᠠᠭᠠᠨᠠᠲᠣ ᠣᠯᠣᠰ Jegüngar Khaganatu Ulus (Mongolian)
- 1634–1758
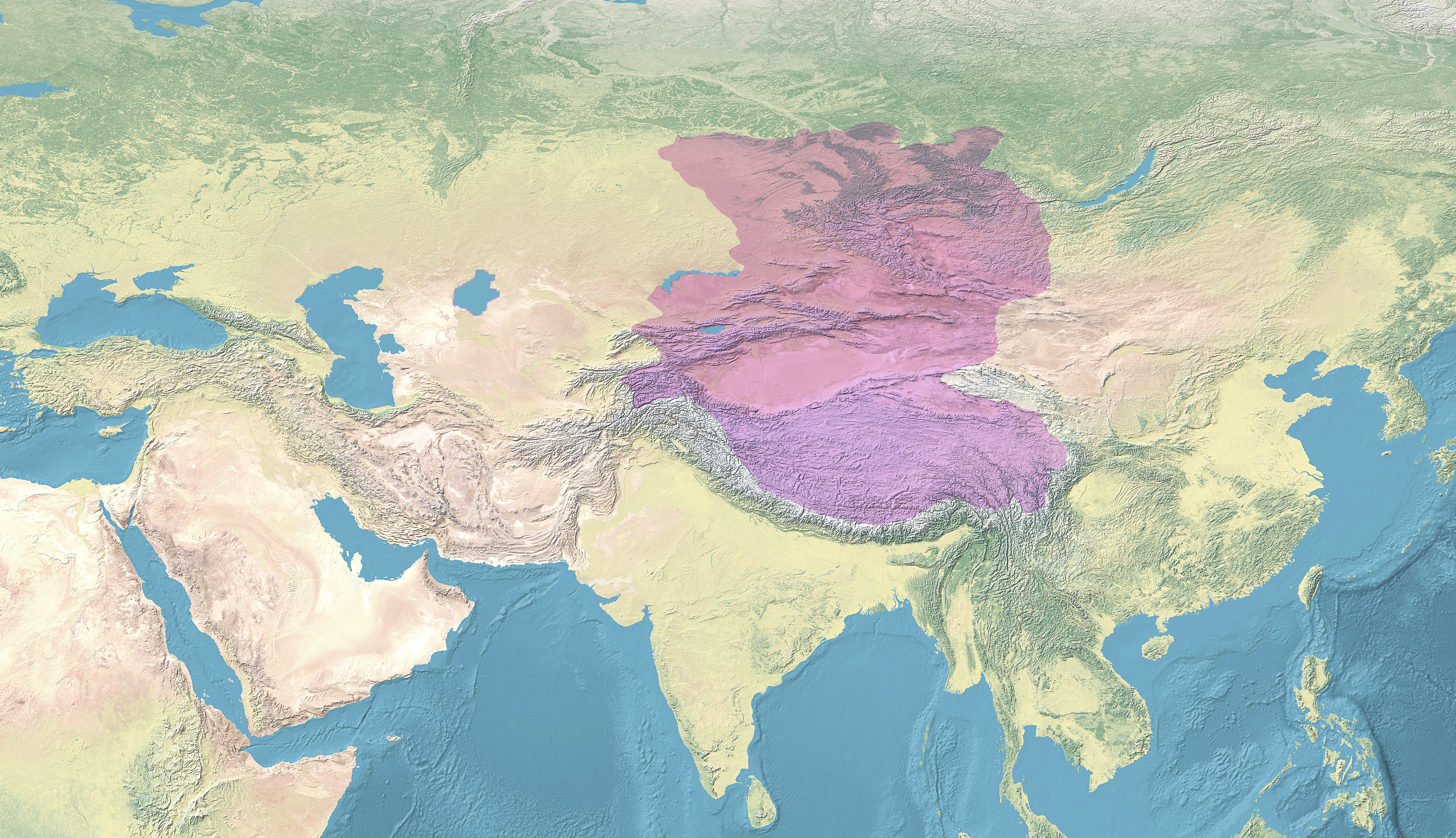
- The Dzungar Khanate at its territorial apex c. 1717, after the conquest of Tibet.
- Status: Nomadic empire
- Capital: Ghulja
- Common languages: Oirat; Chagatai (Note: Predecessor of Modern Uyghur)
- Religion: Tibetan Buddhism; Islam
- Demonym: Dzungar
- Government: Monarchy
- Khan or Khong Tayiji
  - 1634–1653 (first): Erdeni Batur
  - 1653–1671: Sengge
  - 1671–1697: Galdan Boshugtu Khan
  - 1697–1727: Tsewang Rabtan Khan
  - 1727–1745: Galdan Tseren Khan
  - 1746–1750: Tsewang Dorji Namjal
  - c. 1750–1753: Lama Dorji
  - 1753–1755 (last): Dawachi
- Legislature: Customary rules; Yeke Caaji (Great Code)
- Historical era: Early modern period
  - Established: 1634
  - Start of conflict between Kazakhs: 1635
  - Dzungar–Russian conflicts: 1665–1720
  - Conquest of Altishahr: 1680–1681
  - Invasion of Khalkas, First Dzungar–Qing War: 1688–1690
  - Second Dzungar–Qing War: 1715–1720
  - Third Dzungar–Qing War: 1731–1739
  - Qing army occupation of Dzungaria and genocide: 1758

Area
  - Total: 4.56 km^{2} (1.76 sq mi)
- 1650: 3,600,000 km^{2} (1,400,000 sq mi)

Population
- 600,000−1,200,000
- Currency: pūl (a red copper coin)
Preceded by
1634: Oirat confederation
1717: Khoshut Khanate
1705: Yarkent Khanate
Succeeded by
1758: Qing dynasty
- Today part of: Xinjiang; Kazakhstan; Tibet; Mongolia; Gansu; Siberia; Kyrgyzstan

Dzungar Khanate

Chinese name
- Traditional Chinese: 準噶爾汗國
- Simplified Chinese: 准噶尔汗国
Transcriptions
Standard Mandarin
- Hanyu Pinyin: Zhǔngá'ěr Hánguó

Tibetan name
- Tibetan: ཛེ་གུན་གར།།

Mongolian name
- Mongolian Cyrillic: Зүүнгарын Хаант Улс
- Mongolian script: ᠵᠡᠭᠦᠨ ᠭᠠᠷ ‍ᠤᠨ ᠬᠠᠭᠠᠨᠲᠣ ᠣᠯᠣᠰ
Transcriptions
- SASM/GNC: jegün γar-un qaγan-tu ulus

Uyghur name
- Uyghur: جوڭغار; Jongghar

The Dzungar Khanate, (Note: (Mongolian: ᠵᠡᠭᠦᠨᠭᠠᠷ ᠣᠯᠣᠰ Зүүнгар Улс)) also known as the Zunghar Khanate or Junggar Khanate was the last nomadic empire of Mongolic Oirat origin. At its greatest extent, it covered an area from southern Siberia in the north to Tibet in the south, and from present-day west of Mongolia and the Great Wall of China in the east to present-day Kazakhstan in the west. The core of the Dzungar Khanate is today part of northern Xinjiang, also called Dzungaria.

In about 1620, the western Mongols, known as the Oirats, united in the Junggar Basin in Dzungaria. In 1678, Galdan received from the Dalai Lama the title of Boshogtu Khan, making the Dzungars the leading tribe within the Oirats. The Dzungar rulers used the title of Khong Tayiji, which translates into English as "crown prince". Between 1680 and 1688, the Dzungars conquered the Tarim Basin, which is now southern Xinjiang, and defeated the Khalkha Mongols to the east. In 1696, Galdan was defeated by the Qing dynasty and lost Outer Mongolia. In 1717, the Dzungars conquered Tibet, but were driven out in 1720 by the Qing. From 1755 to 1758, Qing dynasty took advantage of a Dzungar civil war to conquer Dzungaria and wipe out the Dzungar people. The defeat of the Dzungars led to the Qing conquest of Mongolia, Tibet, and the creation of Xinjiang as a political administrative unit.

== Etymology ==
"Dzungar" is a compound of the Mongolian word jegün (züün), meaning "left" or "east" and γar meaning "hand" or "wing". It was also referred as Western Mongolia, in contrast to the Northern Yuan in the east.

The region was separately described in contemporary European sources as the Kingdom of the Eleuths, from an infelicitous transcription of the name "Oirats" by French missionaries.

== History ==
=== Origins ===
The Oirats were originally from the forested region of northwestern Mongolia, where they lived during the early 13th century. In The Secret History of the Mongols, the Oirats were classified as a "forest people" (oy-yin irgen) and were not included among the lineages that constituted the Mongol nation. The Oirats were regarded in chronicle as a distinct people rather than as one of the branches of the Mongols proper, and are portrayed as a non-Mongol people, alongside groups such as the Kereits and Naimans. The chronicle mentions them only briefly, identifying them as one of the forest peoples who submitted to Jochi, the eldest son of Genghis Khan, during his campaign of 1207. Oirats viewed themselves as separate Mongolic people and a part of larger Mongolic-speaking group.

Oirat's leader, Qutuqa Beki, submitted to Genghis Khan in 1208, and his house intermarried with all four branches of the Genghisid line. During the Toluid Civil War, the Four Oirat (Choros, Torghut, Dörbet, and Khoid) sided with Ariq Böke and therefore never accepted Kublaid rule. After the Yuan dynasty's collapse, the Oirats supported the Ariq Bökid Jorightu Khan Yesüder to seize the Northern Yuan throne. The Oirats held sway over the Northern Yuan khans until the death of Esen Taishi in 1455, after which they migrated west due to Khalkha Mongol aggression. In 1486, the Oirats became embroiled in a succession dispute, which gave Dayan Khan the opportunity to attack them. In the latter half of the 16th century, the Oirats lost more territory to the Tumed.

Eselvei Khya of the Khoid battled the armies of Ordos Mongols and the Chahars. Later, Kharkhul rebelled against the Khalkhas and repelled them. Soon the Oirats began a war against the Khalkhas and the Kazakhs. They defeated a Khalkha–Kazakh coalition and raided deep into Sighnaq in 1604. In 1608, the Oirats defeated another Kazakh force and repelled an invading Khalkha army. From 1609–1616, the Oirats devastated the Kazakhs and the Kyrgyz, subjugating them in the process.

In 1620, the leaders of the Choros and Torghut Oirats, Khara Khula and Mergen Temene, attacked Ubashi Khong Tayiji, and the first Altan Khan of the Khalkha. They were defeated, and Khara Khula lost his wife and children to the enemy.

In 1620, Oirat taishis sent envoys to the Kazakh khan, Ishim, to conclude a peace treaty; however, because the Oirats did not cease their raids during these negotiations, the khan had the envoys put to death and dispatched his warriors against the Oirats, killing many of them. In 1620–1621, the Oirats, led by Ildai-taiji, defeated the Kazakh Ishim Khan. Ildai-taiji subsequently earned the nickname "Swift as the Wind." Ishim Khan continued his attacks on the Oirats until 1627, and in 1628 the Oirats migrated further away from the Kazakh domains. During this period, Ishim also succeeded in extending his authority over some Oirat tribes for a time.

An all-out war between Ubashi Khong Tayiji and the Oirats lasted until 1623 when Ubashi Khong Tayiji was killed, and the Oirats declared independence at the Battle of Irtysh River.

In 1625, a conflict erupted between the Khoshut chief Chokhur and his uterine brother Baibaghas over inheritance issues. Baibaghas was killed in the fight. However, his younger brothers; Güshi Khan and Kondolon Ubashi took up the fight and pursued Chöükür from the Ishim River to the Tobol River, attacking and killing his tribal followers in 1630. The infighting among the Oirats caused the Torghut chief Kho Orluk to migrate westwards until they came into conflict with the Nogai Horde, which they destroyed. The Torghuts founded the Kalmyk Khanate but still stayed in contact with the Oirats in the east. Every time a great assembly was called, they sent representatives to attend.

In 1632, the Gelug sect in Qinghai was being repressed by the Khalkha Choghtu Khong Tayiji, so they invited Güshi Khan to come and deal with him. In 1636, Güshi led 10,000 Oirats in an invasion of Qinghai, which resulted in the defeat of a 30,000-strong enemy army and the death of Choghtu in 1637. He then entered Central Tibet, where he received from the 5th Dalai Lama the title of the Dharma King Who Upholds the Religion. He then claimed the title of Khan, the first non-Genghisid Mongol to do so, and summoned the Oirats to completely conquer Tibet, creating the Khoshut Khanate. Among those involved was Kharkhul's son, Erdeni Batur, who was granted the title of Khong Tayiji, married the khan's daughter Amin Dara, and was sent back to establish the Dzungar Khanate on the upper Emil River south of the Tarbagatai Mountains.

=== Erdeni Batur's rule ===
The Dzungars invaded the Kazakh Khanate in 1635, capturing their sultan, Jangir in the process. Erdeni Batur later continued his invasions in 1640.

In the winter of 1643, the Oirats launched a campaign into Kazakhstan, plundering Kyrgyz communities along the way. The Kazakhs were aided by Jangir, who commanded a force of 600 warriors. Despite being heavily outnumbered, the Kazakhs inflicted significant losses on the Oirats. Following the arrival of a 20,000-strong army led by Yalangtush Bahadur, the Emir of Samarkand, the Oirats—whose forces numbered around 50,000—were compelled to retreat. Seeking revenge against Jangir, Batur attempted to secure the support of the Volga Kalmyks and form an alliance with them. However, these plans ultimately failed. After careful preparation, Batur Khuntaiji launched a new campaign against the Kazakhs in 1645–1646. This campaign was successful for the Dzungars and inflicted significant losses on the Kazakhs.

The Oirat-Kazakh War of the 1640s and 1650s ultimately brought victory to the Oirats. In the 1650s, the eastern part of Semirechye, as well as the territory between the upper reaches of the Irtysh and Lake Balkhash, was dependent on the Dzungar Khanate. The headquarters of the Khuntaiji was located on the upper reaches of the Irtysh. Thus, Erdeni Batur significantly expanded the borders of his state.

He also established Ghulja as the capital city, naming it Khobak Sari in which he built monastaries, and buildings to populate it. He established relations with the Tsardom of Russia, granting them rights to salt mines and trade and allowing Russians to settle and create outposts. His rule ended in 1653 when he died, before which he requested the Khoshut Khanate to aid him in their war against the Kazakhs, and they sent Galdamba to defeat Jangir at Battle of Turkistan and Bukharans at the Battle of the Chu and Talas river. This consolidated the border of the Dzungar Khanate in the west from Talas River to Ayagöz river.

The establishment of the Dzungar Khanate and the victories won by Oirat armies during this period in Kazakhstan, Mongolia, and Dzungaria enhanced the international prestige of Erdeni Batur and made his headquarters one of the most important political centers in Central Asia.

=== Succession dispute (1653–1677) ===
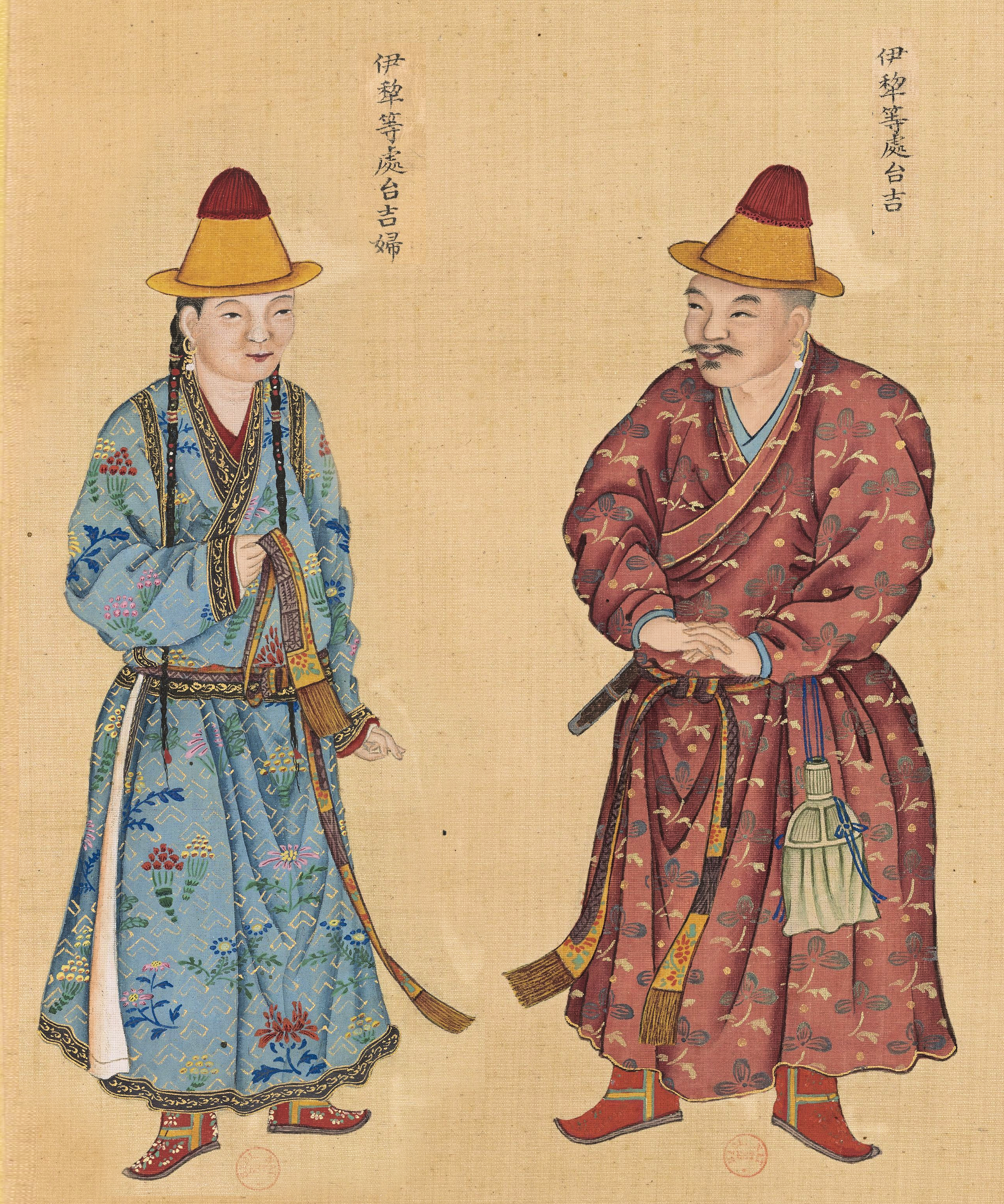
Mongol Prince (Taiji, Chinese: 台吉) from Ili and other regions, and his wife. Huang Qing Zhigong Tu, 1769.

After the death of Batur Khong Tayiji, the Oirat feudal lords were occupied almost exclusively with internal affairs. During this period, the Dzungar army defeated the Bukhara Khanate.

In 1653, Sengge succeeded his father Batur, but he faced dissent from his half-brothers. With the support of Ochirtu Khan of the Khoshut, this strife ended with Sengge's victory in 1661. In 1667, he captured Erinchin Lobsang Tayiji, the third and last Altan Khan. However, he himself was assassinated by his half-brothers Chechen Tayiji and Zotov in a coup in 1670.

Sengge's younger brother Galdan Boshugtu Khan had been residing in Tibet at the time. Upon his birth in 1644, he was recognized as the reincarnation of a Tibetan lama who had died the previous year. In 1656, he left for Tibet, where he received education from Lobsang Chökyi Gyaltsen, 4th Panchen Lama and the 5th Dalai Lama. Upon learning of his brother's death, he immediately returned from Tibet and took revenge on Chechen. In 1671, The Dalai Lama bestowed the title of Khan on Galdan. In 1676, Galdan defeated Chechen near Sayram Lake. Galdan then married Sengge's wife, Anu-Dara, the granddaughter of Ochirtu Khan, he came into conflict with his grandfather-in-law. Fearing Galdan's popularity, Ochirtu supported his uncle and rival Chokhur Ubashi, who refused to recognize Galdan's title. The victory over Ochirtu in 1677 resulted in Galdan's domination of the Oirats. In the next year, the Dalai Lama gave the highest title of Boshogtu Khan to him.

=== Conquest of the Yarkent Khanate (1678–1680) ===
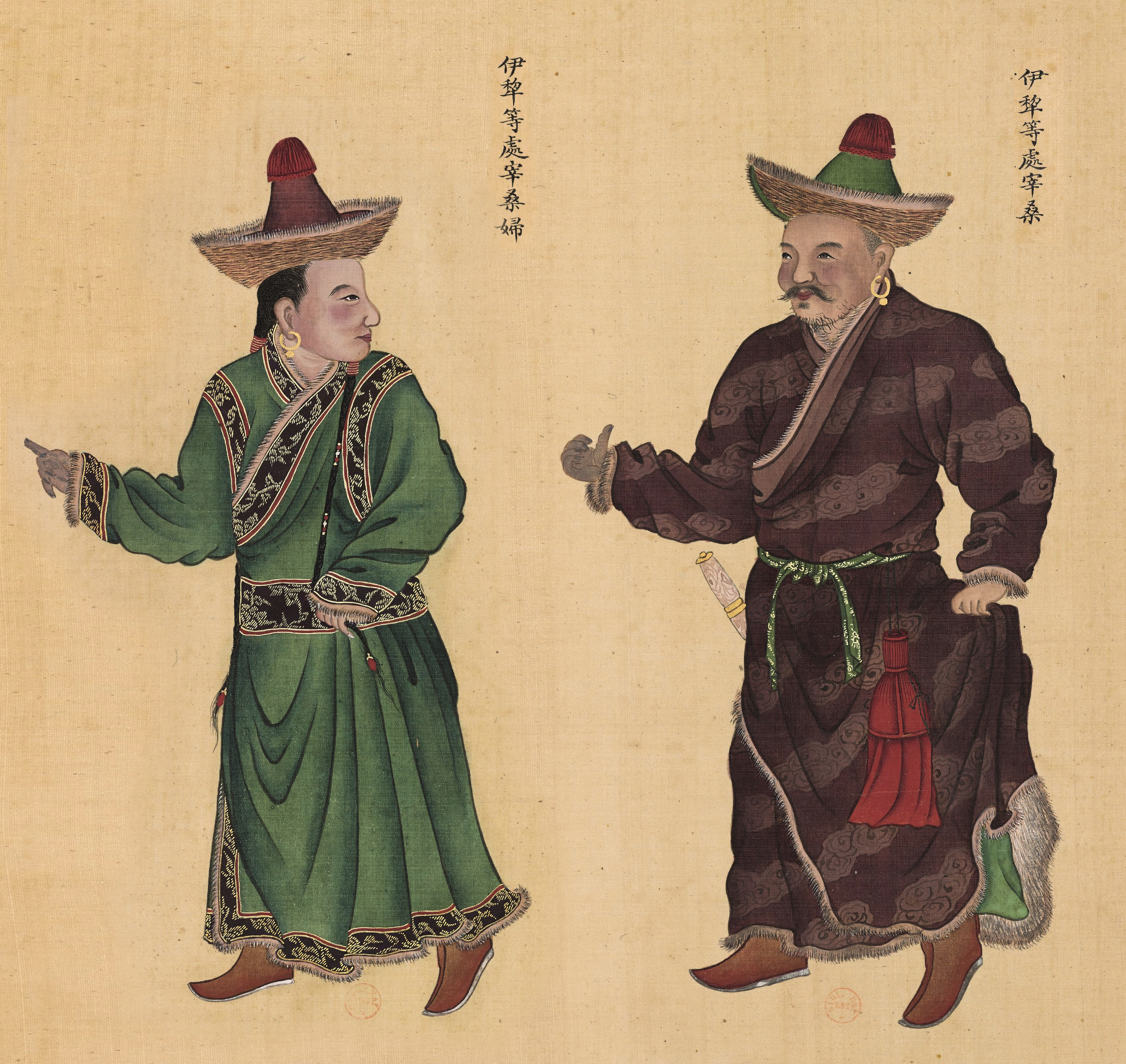
Mongol tribal leader (Zaisang, 宰桑) from Ili and other regions, with his wife. Huang Qing Zhigong Tu, 1769.

From the late 16th century onward, the Yarkent Khanate fell under the influence of the Khojas. The Khojas were Naqshbandi Sufis who claimed descent from the prophet Muhammad or from the Rashidun caliphs. By the reign of Sultan Said Khan in the early 16th century, the Khojas already had a strong influence in court and over the khan. In 1533, an especially influential Khoja named Makhdum-i Azam arrived in Kashgar, where he settled and had two sons. These two sons hated each other, and they passed down their mutual hatred to their children. The two lineages came to dominate large parts of the khanate, splitting it between two factions: the Aq Taghliq (White Mountain) in Kashgar and the Qara Taghliq (Black Mountain) in Yarkand. Yulbars patronized the Aq Taghliqs and suppressed the Qara Taghliqs, which caused much resentment and resulted in his assassination in 1670. He was succeeded by his son, who ruled for only a brief period before Ismail Khan was enthroned. Ismail reversed the power struggle between the two Muslim factions and drove out the Aq Taghliq leader, Afaq Khoja. Afaq fled to Tibet, where the 5th Dalai Lama aided him in enlisting the help of Galdan Boshugtu Khan.

In 1678, the Dzungars intensified their advance into Tarim Basin and captured Yarkand. Later, they launched campaigns against the Kyrgyz, Uzbeks, and Kazakhs, capturing the cities of Osh and Sairam. In 1679, Galdan led 30,000 men to Turpan and Hami and soon in 1680, Galdan led 120,000 men into the Yarkent Khanate and conquered it. They were aided by the Aq Taghliqs and Hami and Turpan, which had already submitted to the Dzungars. Ismail's son, Babak Sultan, died in the battle for Kashgar. The general Iwaz Beg died in the defense of Yarkand. The Dzungars defeated the Moghul forces without much difficulty and took Ismail and his family prisoner. Galdan installed Abd ar-Rashid Khan II, son of Babak, as puppet khan.

=== Galdan's campaigns in Central Asia ===
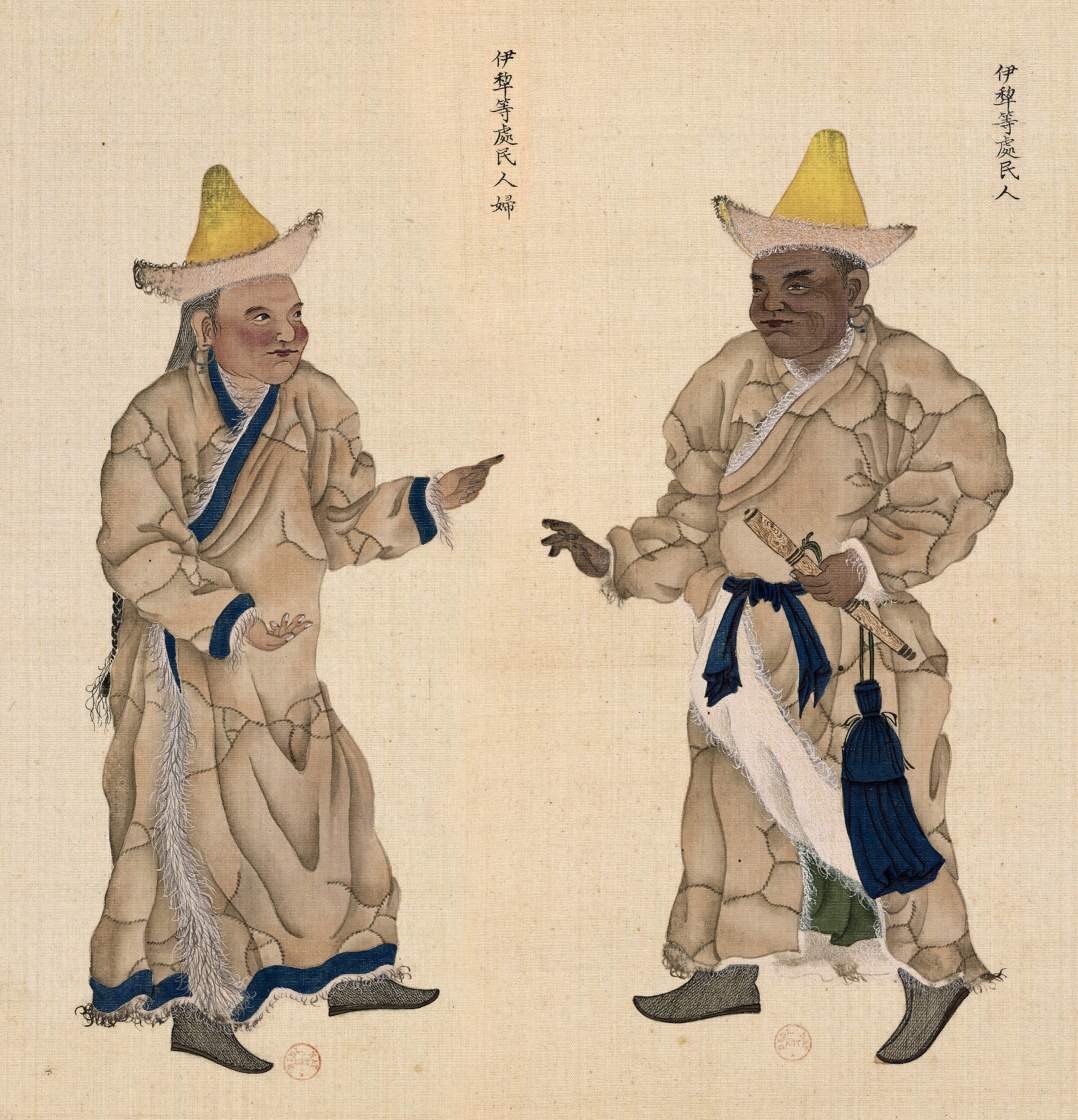
Commoner from Ili region, with his wife. Huang Qing Zhigong Tu, 1769.

A new round of Oirat military expansion was associated with the rise to power of Galdan Boshoktu Khan, a former Buddhist monk and later a stern and energetic ruler. In the first half of the 1680s, his armies advanced toward Kazakhstan. Galdan demanded that the Kazakhs convert to Lamaism and join the Dzungar Empire. The Dasht-i-Kipchak nomads put up a desperate resistance, but in decisive battles, Tauke Khan's militia was routed, and the Kazakh ruler's son was captured and sent as a hostage to Lhasa. The Dzungars occupied the largest cities of southern Kazakhstan, including the wealthy and densely populated Sayram. Galdan's troops also invaded the Tarim Basin and subjugated the Muslim region. The cities of the Tarim Basin were subjected to tribute and began supplying soldiers to the western Mongol armies.

After this, Galdan subjugated the Kyrgyz people and devastated the Fergana Valley in campaigns from 1683 to 1685. The Dzungars also established dominance over the Baraba Tatars and exacted yasak (tribute) from them.

=== Khalkha war (1687–1688) ===
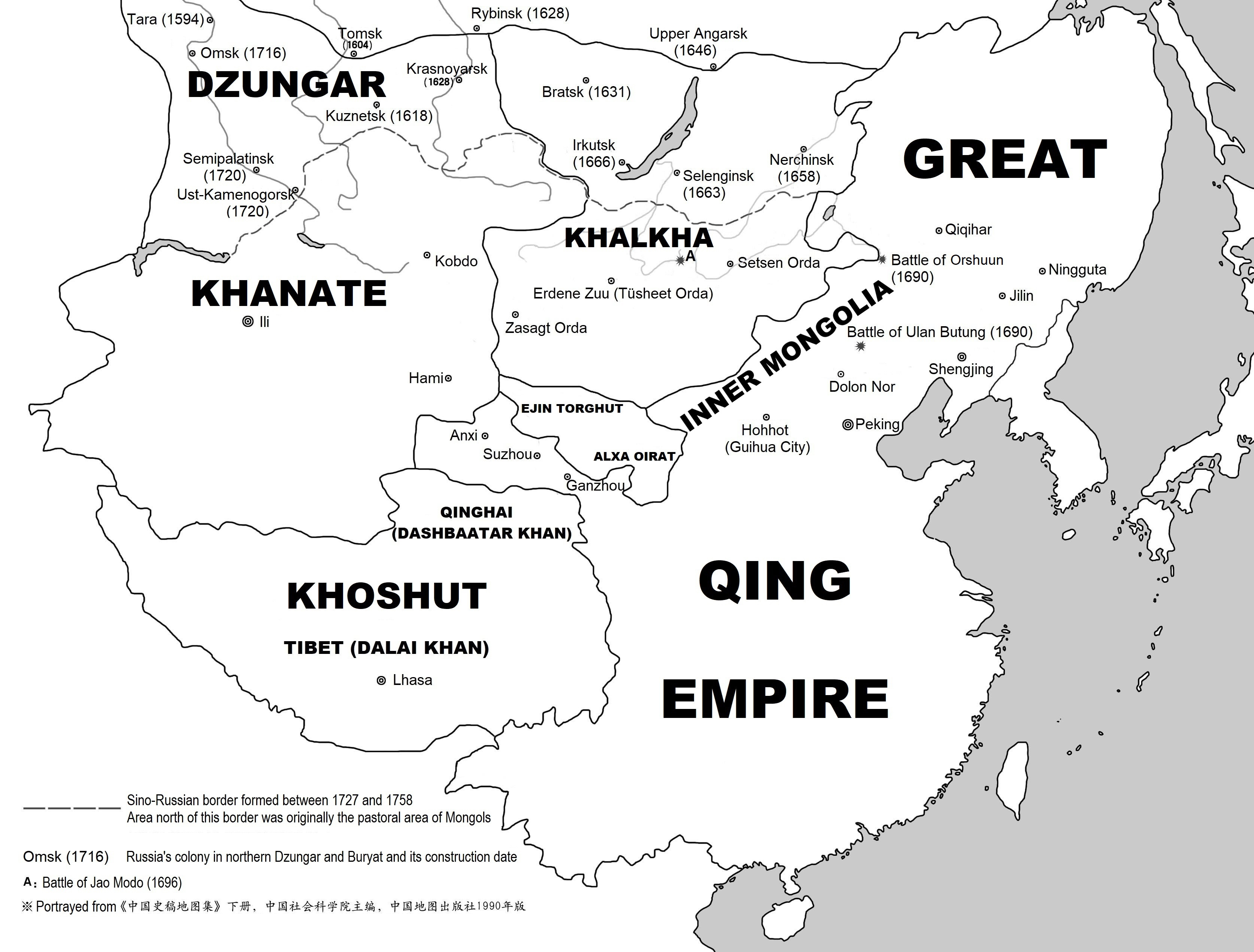
Dzungar Khanate before Galdan's invasion of Khalkha in 1688

The Oirats had established peace with the Khalkha Mongols since Ligdan Khan died in 1634, and the Khalkhas were preoccupied with the rise of the Qing dynasty. However, when the Jasaghtu Khan Shira lost part of his subjects to the Tüsheet Khan Chikhundorj, Galdan moved his orda near the Altai Mountains to prepare an attack. Chikhundorj attacked the right wing of the Khalkhas and killed Shira in 1687. In 1688, Galdan dispatched troops under his younger brother Dorji-jav against Chikhundorj, but they were eventually defeated. Dorji-jav was killed in battle. Chikhundorj then murdered Degdeehei Mergen Ahai of the Jasaghtu Khan, who was on the way to Galdan. To avenge the death of his brother, Galdan established friendly relations with the Russians, who were already at war with Chikhundorj over territories near Lake Baikal. Armed with Russian firearms, Galdan led 30,000 Dzungar troops into Khalkha Mongolia in 1688 and defeated Chikhundorj in three days. The Siberian Cossacks, meanwhile, attacked and defeated a Khalkha army of 10,000 near Lake Baikal. After two bloody battles with the Dzungars near Erdene Zuu Monastery and Tomor, Chakhundorji and his brother Jebtsundamba Khutuktu Zanabazar fled across the Gobi Desert to the Qing dynasty and submitted to the Kangxi Emperor. Leading to The First Dzungar-Qing War.

=== First Qing war (1690–1696) ===
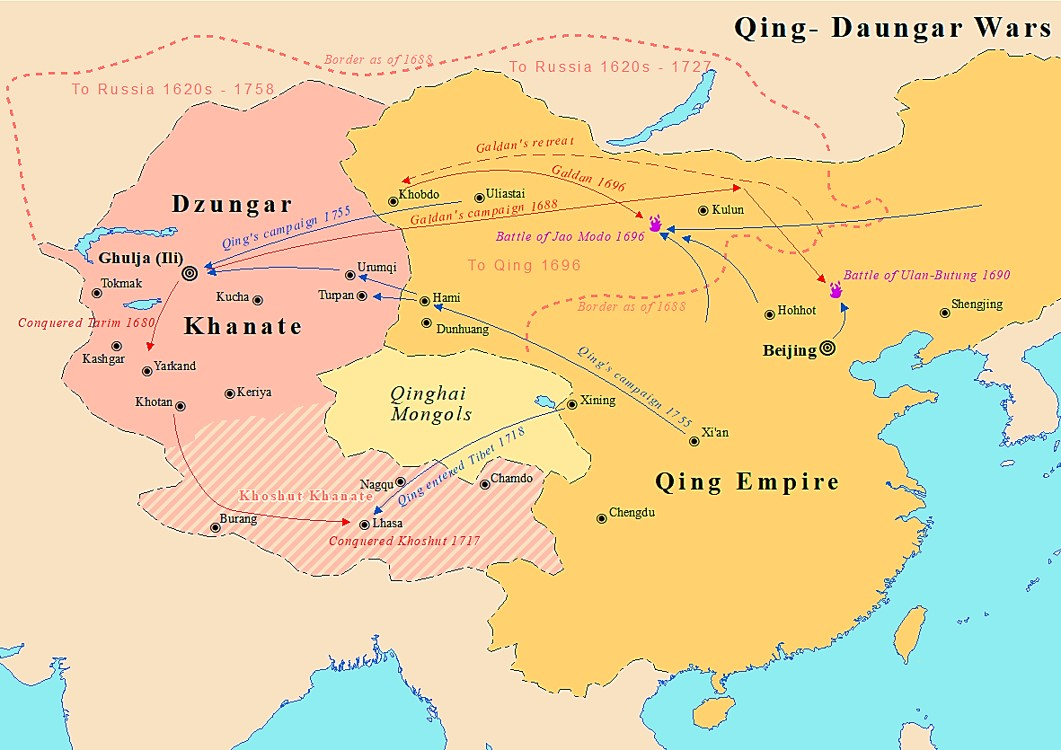
Qing Dzungar wars from 1688 to 1757

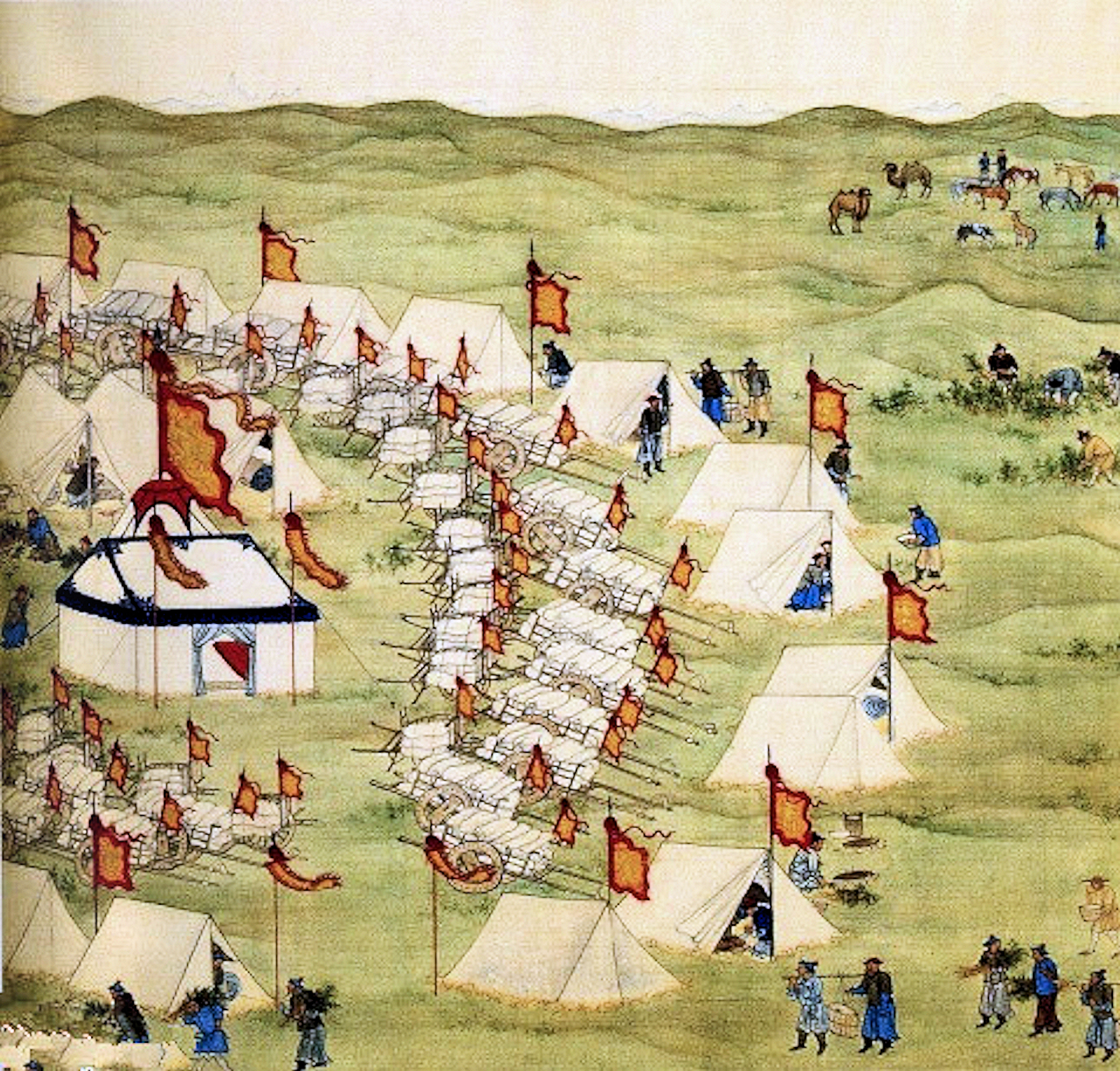
Military camp of the Chinese Emperor at Kherlen River during the campaign of 1696

Late in the summer of 1690, Galdan crossed the Kherlen River with a force of 20,000 and engaged a Qing army at Battle of Ulan Butung 350 kilometers north of Beijing near the western headwaters of the Liao River. Galdan was forced to retreat and escaped destruction because the Qing army did not have the supplies or ability to pursue him. In 1696, the Kangxi Emperor led 100,000 troops into Mongolia. Galdan fled from the Kherlen only to be caught by another Qing army attacking from the west. He was defeated in the ensuing Battle of Jao Modo near the upper Tuul River. Galdan's wife, Anu, was killed, and the Qing army captured 20,000 cattle and 40,000 sheep. Galdan fled with a small handful of followers. In 1697, he died in the Altai Mountains near Khovd on 4 April. Back in Dzungaria, his nephew Tsewang Rabtan, who had revolted in 1689, was already in control as of 1691.

=== Chagatai rebellion (1693–1705) ===
Galdan installed Abd ar-Rashid Khan II, son of Babak, as puppet khan in the Yarkent Khanate. The new khan forced Afaq Khoja to flee again, but Abd ar-Rashid's reign was also ended unceremoniously two years later when riots erupted in Yarkand. He was replaced by his brother Muhammad Imin Khan. Muhammad sought help from the Qing dynasty, Khanate of Bukhara, and the Mughal Empire in combating the Dzungars. In 1693, Muhammad successfully attacked the Dzungar Khanate, taking 30,000 captives. Unfortunately, Afaq Khoja reappeared and overthrew Muhammad in a revolt led by his followers. Afaq's son, Yahiya Khoja, was enthroned, but his reign was cut short in 1695 when both he and his father were killed while suppressing local rebellions. In 1696, Akbash Khan was placed on the throne, but the begs of Kashgar refused to recognize him, and instead allied with the Kyrgyz to attack Yarkand, taking Akbash prisoner. The begs of Yarkand went to the Dzungars, who sent troops and ousted the Kyrgyz in 1705. The Dzungars installed a non-Chagatai ruler, Mirza Alim Shah Beg, thereby ending the rule of Chagatai khans forever. Abdullah Tarkhan Beg of Hami also rebelled in 1696 and defected to the Qing dynasty. In 1698, Qing troops were stationed in Hami.

=== Tsewang Rabtan's Central Asian campaign (1698–1718) ===
In 1698, Galdan's successor Tsewang Rabtan reached Lake Tengiz and Turkistan. The Dzungars controlled Jetisu and Tashkent until 1745. The Dzungar invasion forced the Kazakhs to seek help from Russia. They invaded the Kazakhs again in 1708 but were repelled by the Kazakhs in 1711–1712. The Dzungars under Tsewang Rabtan's two sons, Lobsangsür and Galdan Tseren, counterattacked and recovered their lost territories. At the beginning of the 1710s, Tsewang Rabtan's forces invaded Kyrgyz territory and subjugated several hundred Kyrgyz families, whom he enlisted in the struggle against the Kazakhs who attacked Oirat territory in 1714.

Having achieved some stability on the southern and eastern borders of Dzungaria, Tsewang-Rabtan sent his troops to attack the Kazakhs in 1716. The Oirat army under the command of Tseren Dondook defeated the Kazakh forces, capturing a significant number of prisoners. In the same year, Kazakh troops attacked the nomadic Choros on the Ili River, capturing Lieutenant Markel Trubnikov.

In 1717, Dzungar forces routed a Kazakh militia numbering 30,000 men. at the Battle of the Ayagoz River. The Dzungars built wooden trenches and fortifications to hold their position until reinforcements arrived. A reinforcement of about 800–1,500 men then arrived and defeated the Kazakh army. In the spring of 1718, the Dzungars made a swift march from Jetisu to the Arys and Chayan rivers, seeking to capture Turkistan, the headquarters of the Kazakh khans. Several battles took place, with the Dzungars reportedly "cutting down the Kazakh horde".

=== Second Qing war (1714–1720) ===
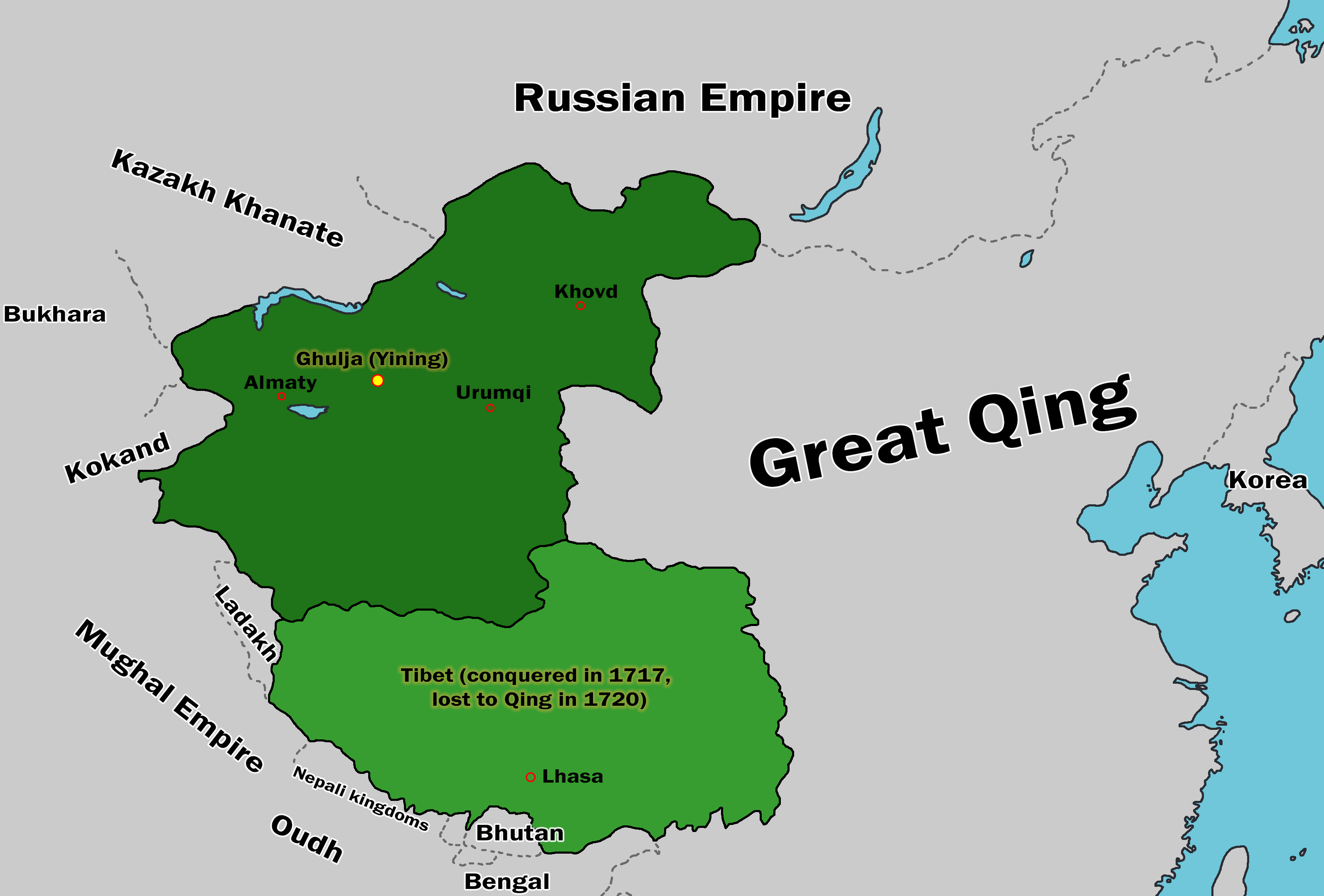
Dzungar Khanate at its territorial extent after its conquest of Tibet in 1717

In 1714, Tsewang Rabtan continued his war against the Qing dynasty by sacking Hami. Tsewang Rabtan's brother Tseren Dhondup invaded the Khoshut Khanate in 1717, deposed Yeshe Gyatso, killed Lha-bzang Khan, and looted Lhasa. The Kangxi Emperor retaliated in 1718, but his military expedition was annihilated by the Dzungars in the Battle of the Salween River, not far from Lhasa. A second and larger expedition was sent by the Kangxi Emperor, which expelled the Dzungars from Tibet in 1720. They brought Kälzang Gyatso with them from Kumbum to Lhasa and installed him as the 7th Dalai Lama in 1721. The people of Turpan and Pichan took advantage of the situation to rebel under a local chief, Emin Khoja, and defected to the Qing dynasty.

=== Central Asian campaign (1723–1732) ===
After securing peace with the Qing dynasty to their east, the Dzungars launched their largest attack on the oases of Central Asia in 1723. They moved their forces into the territories inhabited by those Kazakh and Kyrgyz tribes that had remained independent of the Dzungar Khanate. The Kazakhs fought against the Dzungars in 1723–1730, which resulted in the defeat of the Kazakhs and the loss of their capital.

The economic life of Central Asia was paralyzed. The mass migration of Kazakhs into Central Asia, caused by the Dzungar invasion, led to severe socio-economic consequences for the region. Large groups of nomads—Kazakhs, Kyrgyz, and Karakalpaks together with their herds devastated agricultural areas, trampled crops, and crowded into cities that were already densely populated. According to contemporary accounts, the continuous raids brought devastation and famine to Transoxiana, reaching the point of cannibalism; many cities, including Samarkand, Khiva, and Bukhara, remained largely deserted for more than a decade. Trade declined, money disappeared from circulation, and caravans were forced to seek alternative routes through Dzungaria.

The Karakalpak people suffered severe losses from the Dzungar invasion of 1723–1725. They were forced to abandon the middle reaches of the Syr Darya, with some migrating upstream toward Tashkent and others moving downstream to the shores of the Aral Sea, the Emba, the Ural River, and beyond. This migration interrupted the process of national consolidation among the Karakalpaks. Karakalpaks became divided into the "Upper" and "Lower" groups: the former fell under the domination of Dzungars, while the latter came under the authority of the rulers of the Senior and Middle Zhuzes of the Kazakhs. Te Dzungars’ consolidation of control over the middle Syr Darya region ultimately formalized this division and determined the differing historical trajectories of the two groups.

During the same years, Dzungar forces also struck the Kyrgyz people. According to Ivan Unkovsky, Tsewang Rabtan brought under his authority the people known as the "Buruts" (the Kyrgyz), who nomadized in the region of Issyk-Kul. Some Kyrgyz voluntarily accepted Dzungar rule by providing hostages (amanats), while others resisted. Dzungar detachments also advanced as far as the principalities of the Hindu Kush and the Pamir-Alay. This event became part of the historical memory of the Kyrgyz people as one of Galdan Tseren's most devastating raids, forcing them to leave the Chu River and flee to Hisor and Badakhshan (Tajikistan).

In Transoxiana, the displaced Kazakhs arrived in Samarkand, which they either seized, or were invited by Rajab Khan who deliberately sought support from the nomads. Responding to his call, the Kazakhs occupied the entire "fertile valley as far as the mists of Bukhara" and, for seven years, ravaged the regions of Samarkand and Bukhara, as well as Shahrisabz and Karshi, extending their raids as far as Hisar and Kulob. According to a report by the head of the Orenburg Expedition to the Russian Empress Anna Ioannovna, the displaced Kazakhs "approached Bukhara itself and devastated all the Uzbeks…".

Between 1727 and 1730, Kazakh forces won several battles against the Dzungars. In the summer of 1730, the Kazakhs dealt a severe blow to the Dörbets, and in the autumn of the following year, having learned of the departure of large Oirat forces to Mongolia, they made a deep raid into Dzungaria. In 1732, Galdan Tseren attacked the Kyrgyz who were nomadizing in the Ketmen-Tyube Valley.

=== Galdan Tseren (1727–1745) ===
Tsewang Rabtan died suddenly in 1727 and was succeeded by his son Galdan Tseren, by killing his half-brother Lobsangsür. He continued the war against the Kazakhs and the Khalkha Mongols. In retaliation against attacks against his Khalkha subjects, the Yongzheng Emperor of the Qing dynasty sent an invasion force of 10,000 in the early 1730s, which the Dzungars defeated near the Khoton Lake. The next year, however, the Dzungars suffered a defeat against the Khalkhas near Erdene Zuu Monastery. In 1731, the Dzungars attacked Turpan, which had previously defected to the Qing dynasty. Amin Khoja led the people of Turpan in a retreat into Gansu, where they settled in Guazhou. In 1735, the Dzungars concluded a peace treaty with the Qing and subsequently attacked the Senior Jüz (a Kazakh horde). In 1739, Galdan Tseren agreed to the boundary between Khalkha and Dzungar territory.

Galdan Tseren sent a message seeking to conclude a military alliance against the Manchus and to reconcile with the Northern Yuan Mongols.

"We had originally lived in one place, being very amicable towards each other. Because Galdan Boshugtu Khan was not on good terms with you all, we lived scattered. Later, you all submitted to the Middle Kingdom (China), rendering service and paying tribute, which is deeply regrettable. You all are the descendants of Chinggis Khan, and are not people’s subordinates. Why not move your pastoral nomadic [activities] to the Altai again, join us to live in one place, and enjoy peace and happiness together, so that the former friendship may be reinstated ? If war occurs, we shall join forces to resist."

— Galdan Tseren

In the spring of 1739, 24,000 Oirat cavalrymen invaded the lands of the Middle Jüz in two separate columns. The Kazakhs, who were preparing campaigns against the Kalmyk Khanate and the Bashkirs, were caught unprepared and were unable to repel the Dzungar invasion. The war continued until 1741. Despite several Kazakh victories over Dzungar forces, the Kazakhs were ultimately defeated.

As a result of successful campaigns against the Kazakhs (1734—1735, 1740—1742), the authority of Galdan-Tseren was recognized by the Greater and Middle Jüz. The feudal lords of the Greater Jüz annually sent hostages (amanats) to Urga, and the population paid tribute-alban. The Khan of the Middle Jüz Abulmambet and the sultans Ablai, Abulfeiz, and Niyaz were also forced to send hostages to Dzungaria. The Russian lieutenant D. Gladyshev, who returned from a trip to Abulkhair in Orenburg in the spring of 1742, reported on a meeting of the nobility of the Younger Jüz, at which a decision was made to recognize the citizenship of the Dzungar khuntaiji. Soon, the Khan of the Younger Jüz Abulkhair also sent his son to Dzungaria.

The Dzungars invaded Kokand in 1742 and 1745 and were repelled, consolidating Abdul Karim Bi's leadership and enhancing the Kokand Khanate's regional standing. Conversely, the significant military and economic strain of the conflict accelerated the Dzungar Khanate's decline, effectively ending its political hegemony in Central Asia. This shift in the regional balance of power facilitated the liberation of the Senior Jüz from Dzungar rule.

By 1745, Dzungaria was the largest power in Central Asia, a force to be reckoned with by the two most formidable Eurasian empires, the Russian Empire and the Qing Empire. The Dzungar Khanate controlled a significant portion of modern Kazakhstan, the northern part of the Xinjiang Uyghur Autonomous Region of China, southwestern Mongolia, and the southern part of the Altai Mountains. The rulers of the oasis states, Altai, and the Greater Kazakh Jüz considered the Dzungar Khanate their supreme overlord.

=== End of the Dzungar Khanate (1745–1757) ===
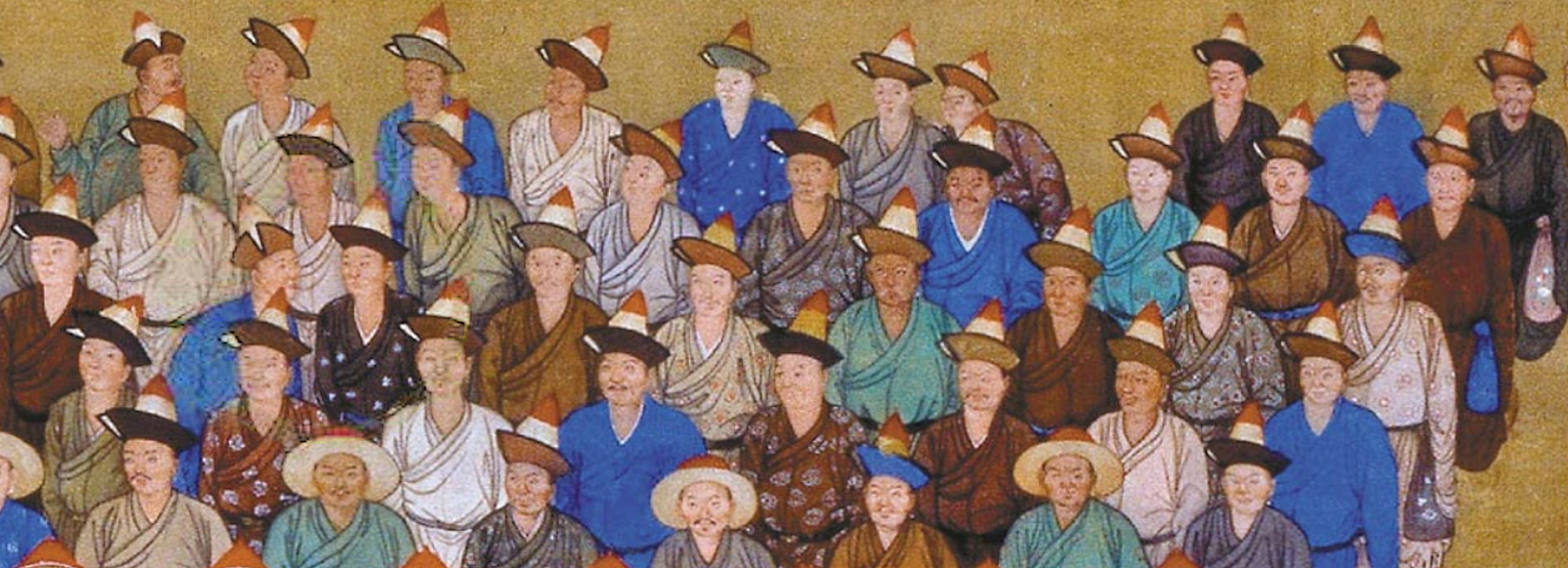
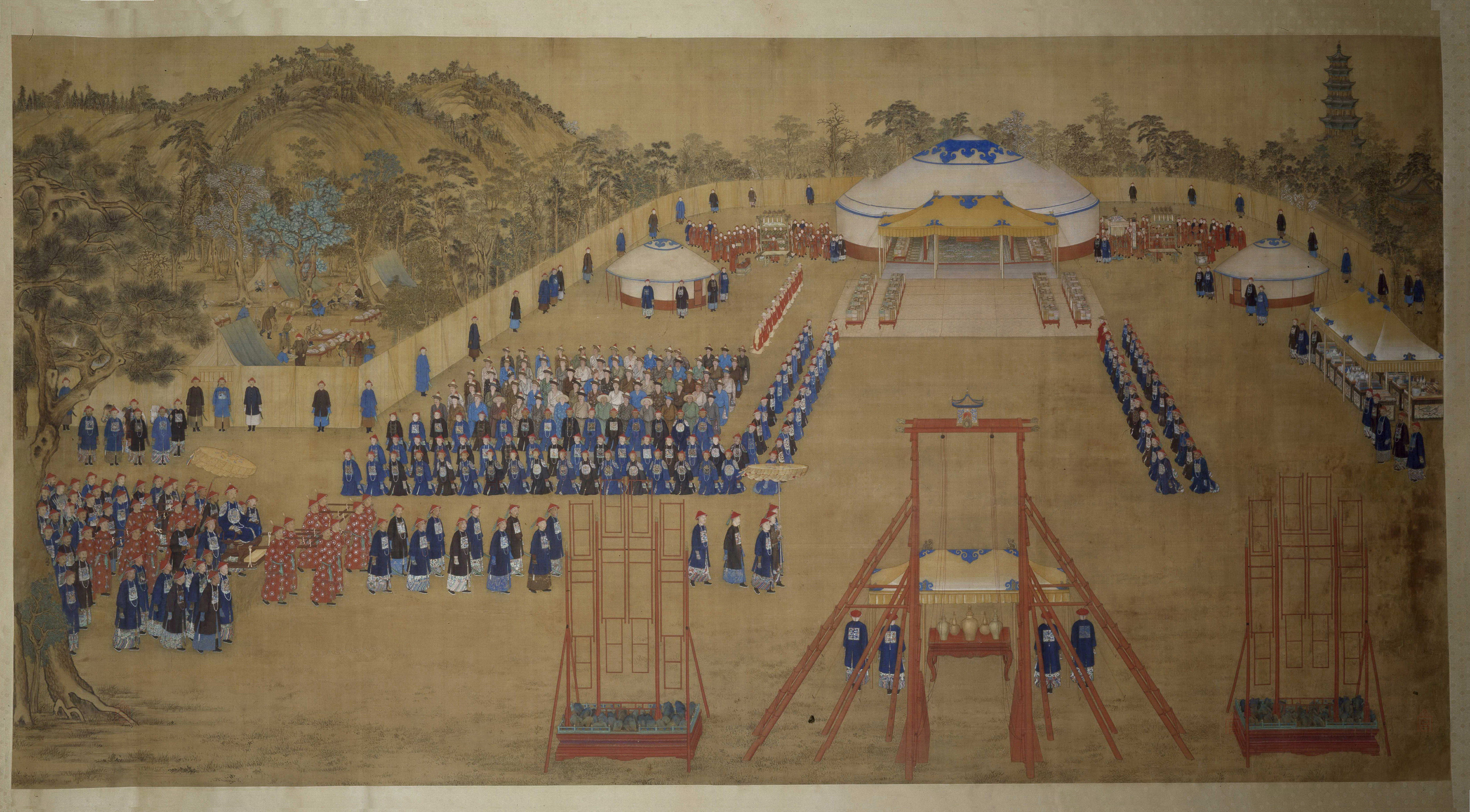
Dzungar Dörbet delegation submitting to the Qing, at the camp of the Qianlong Emperor in the Chengde Mountain Resort in 1754, in 萬樹園賜宴圖, painted in 1755 by Jean-Denis Attiret

Galdan Tseren died in 1745, triggering widespread rebellion in the Tarim Basin and starting a succession dispute among his sons. In 1749, Galden Tseren's son Lama Dorji seized the throne from his younger brother, Tsewang Dorji Namjal. He was overthrown by his cousin Dawachi and the Khoid noble Amursana, but they too fought over control of the khanate.

The internal struggles of the Dzungars drew in neighboring powers, including the Kazakhs. Between 1752 and 1755, the final military clashes between the Dzungars and the Kazakhs of the Middle Jüz took place. During this period, Sultan Ablai (later Ablai Khan) intervened in Dzungar affairs, alternately supporting rival claimants and leading campaigns into Dzungaria at the head of Middle Jüz forces. At various times he cooperated with both Dawachi and Amursana against their opponents, while seeking to strengthen Kazakh influence and obtain territorial concessions from Dzungar rulers and noyans.

According to Soviet historians Sulemeinov and Moiseyev, in the autumn and winter of 1752, the Dzungar army and Kazakh militias fought with varying success, although the advantage was shifting in favor of the Kazakhs and soon reports appeared of the defeat of the Dzungars. Despite these military setbacks, the Dzungar ruler rejected Ablai's proposals for peace negotiations. Ablai sent ambassadors, but the delegation was captured: one ambassador was killed, and another was captured and forced to reveal the Kazakh camps.

Ablai and his elders supported Dawachi and Amursana. On 23 December 1753, an elder of the Kazakh Naiman volost reported to a Russian ensign that the Kazakhs had been sent as support and defeated many "Kalmyk uluses". In the autumn of 1753, Kazakh detachments numbering around 5,000 men operated in Dzungaria. At the request of Dawachi, Kazakh forces conducted a series of raids. Their main attacks were directed against the Dörbet Oirats but they also destroyed the Bargas otok (territorial unit), which belonged to Dzungar princes. Ablai and Dawachi agreed to joint military operations.

Other Dzungar noyans, including Amursana and Nemekhu-Jirgali, also began to resist Dawachi. They had increased the number of their followers to about 7,000 households and openly challenged his authority. Amursana's envoys appealed to Ablai for assistance, requesting 20,000 sheep and as many camels as possible, promising payment in return. Ablai provided the requested aid, and Amursana revealed his plans and invited his allies to join him. It is unclear what prompted Ablai and other Kazakh leaders to break their alliance with Dawachi. It may be concluded that an agreement concerning the relationship between the Dzungar Khanate and the Kazakh jüzes was reached.

As a result of their dispute, in 1753, three of Dawachi's relatives, ruling the Dörbet and Bayad, defected to the Qing and migrated into Khalkha territory. The next year, Amursana also defected. In 1754, Yusuf, the ruler of Kashgar, rebelled and forcefully converted the Dzungars living there to Islam. His older brother, Jahan Khoja of Yarkand, also rebelled but was captured by the Dzungars due to the treachery of Ayyub Khoja of Aksu. Jahan's son Sadiq gathered 7,000 men in Khotan and attacked Aksu in retaliation.

In July–August 1754, Ablai launched a campaign into Dzungaria. Dawachi's failed to restore relations with Ablai but Ablai's victory did not save Amursana from defeat. Under attacks by Oirat and Uriankhai detachments, Amursana fled to the Qing dynasty with a small number of followers. Ablai prepared for further incursions into Dzungaria. Having dealt with Amursana, Dawachi decided to strike at Ablai's nomadic encampments, where the noyan Erinchin, an opponent of Dawachi, had also taken refuge. At the same time, Dawachi planned to appeal to the Russian government for military assistance in his struggle against the Kazakhs. However, the onset of winter and renewed internal conflict forced the Dzungar khan to withdraw his forces. During the winter, many Dzungar noyans and zaisangs migrated to the upper reaches of the Ili River, fearing an invasion by Kazakh forces. Meanwhile, a new and formidable enemy appeared in the east, against whom the Oirat state proved powerless, and which soon began its advance into Dzungaria.

In the spring of 1755, the Qianlong Emperor dispatched an army—numbering either 50,000 or between 90,000 and 200,000 troops—against Dawachi. He framed his invasion as an act of benevolence intended to end the suffering of the Dzungars, while simultaneously placing the blame for their plight upon the people themselves:

"Alas, you Dzungars, you are of the same ilk as the Mongols, aren’t you? Why did you separate from them? (...) People stood there with their mouths open because of the misery. I was anxious that your misery came to a standstill. And I hope that it will not — with my help — last till the next morning (...) If Heaven wants to strengthen somebody, people cannot injure him, even if they want his downfall. ...You want to honour the Yellow Doctrine and pray to Buddha and the Bodhisattvas. But in your hearts, you are like man-eating Rakshas. Therefore you were unable to escape from your self incurred retribution with your lives when your crimes were at the lowest [moral level] and your wickedness reached a zenith"

— Qianlong Emperor

==== Storming of the Camp at Gädän-Ola (1755) ====
"Storming of the Camp at Gädän-Ola"

The Qing army met almost no resistance and destroyed the Dzungar Khanate within the span of 100 days. The Chinese army, supplemented on the way by Muslim and renegade Dzungar troops, surprised Dawachi at the site of Borotola in June 1755, about 300 li from Ili. Dawachi had about 10,000 troops and retreated to Mount Keteng, about 80 li from Ili, while sending messengers for reinforcements, but the messengers were intercepted by the Chinese. The Qing army was able to surprise and capture Dawachi's army at the camp, and a charge was led by the Dzungar renegade Ayusi and 20 of his men, who stormed the camp and where able to conduct about 8,000 prisoners to the Chinese camp (an event depicted in the Qing painting "Storming of the Camp at Gädän-Ola"). Only 2,000 soldiers escaped with Dawachi at their head. Dawachi fled into the mountains north of Aksu but was captured by the Uyghur leader Khojis, beg of Uchturpan, at the request of the Chinese, and delivered to the Qing.

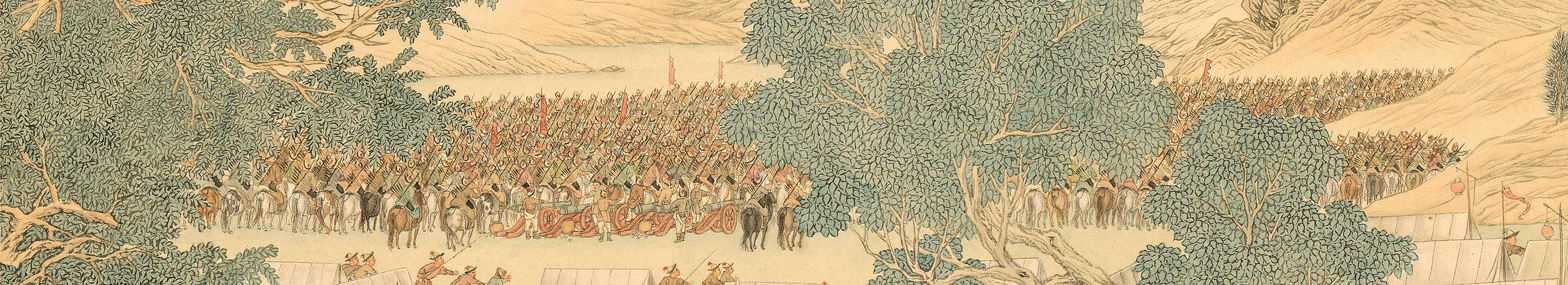
The Dzungar army of Dawachi at Gädän-Ola. Painting by Jesuit painter at the Qing court, Ignatius Sichelbart, 1761 (detail).

==== Surrender of Dawachi (1755) ====
Dawachi surrendered to the Qing general Zhaohui. The scene was immortalized in the painting "Zhaohui receives the surrender of Dawachi at Ili" by the Jesuit court painter Ignatius Sichelbart. Dawachi was taken to Beijing, but was pardoned by the Emperor. Together with his captor Khojis, he was made a Prince, and "awarded banner privileges".

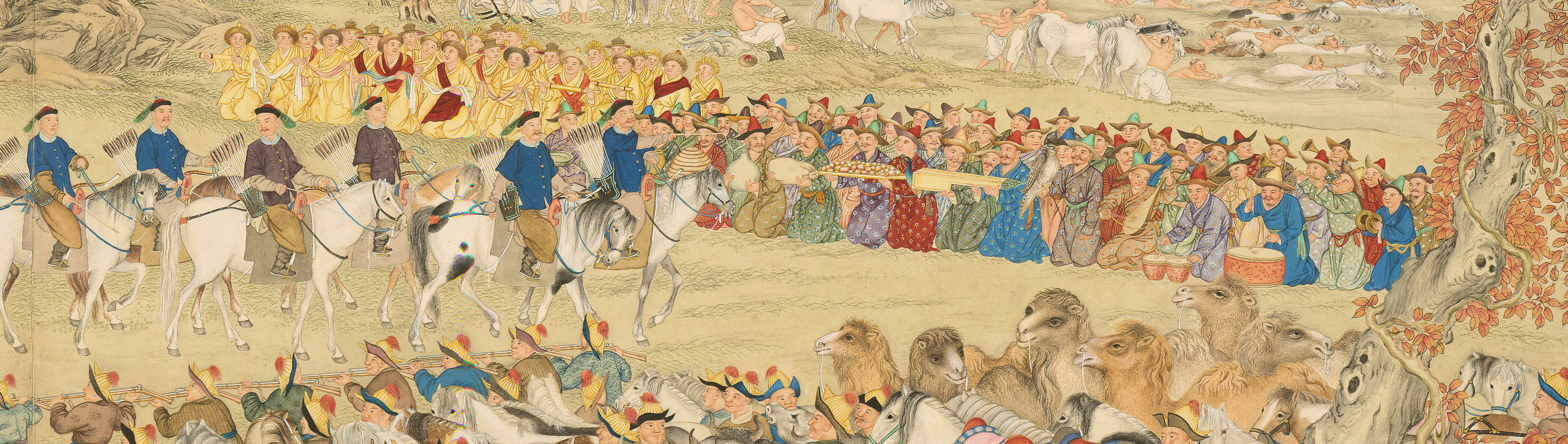
Qing general Zhaohui (on horse) receives the surrender of Dawachi at Ili in 1755. Painting by Jesuit painter at the Qing court, Ignatius Sichelbart, 1761 (detail).

=== Amursana's rebellion (1755–1757) ===
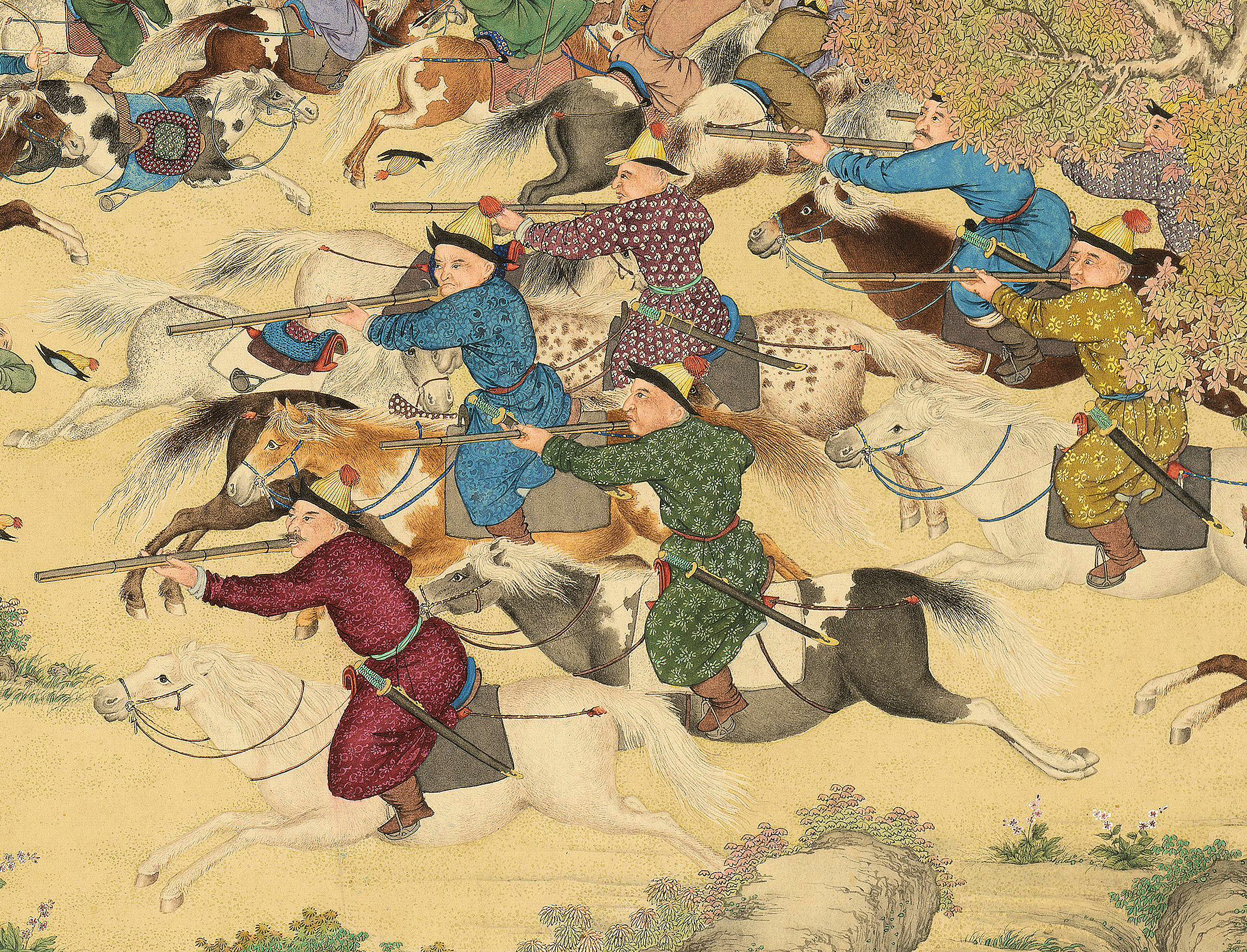
Dzungar partisans of Amursana, in the Battle of Khorgos against Qing China (1758). Painting by Jean Denis Attiret.

After defeating the Dzungar Khanate, the Qing planned to install khans for each of the four Oirat tribes, but Amursana, who had been an ally of the Qing against Dawachi, wanted to rule as khan of the Dzungars. Instead, the Qianlong Emperor made him only khan of the Khoid. Amursana started gathering troops and delayed his formal submission to the Qing. Qianlong sent the Khalkha prince, Erinchindorj, and Bandi to capture Amursana and bring him to the Emperor in Chengde. Amursana fled to the Irtysh.

In the summer, Amursana, along with Mongol leader Chingünjav, led a revolt against the Qing. Amursana was defeated in the Battle of Oroi-Jalatu, in which the Qing general Zhaohui attacked the Dzungars at night in present day Wusu. Amursana fled north to seek refuge with the Kazakhs. The Qing army conducted a full-scale search while implementing a scorched-earth policy on Amursana’s abandoned pastures. The empire’s greatest concern was a potential alliance between Amursana and the Kazakhs, the least-known and most remote nomadic people, and, according to Peter Perdue, "the most difficult to intimidate". From the summer of 1756 to the middle of 1757, fierce battles took place between Kazakh detachments and Qing armies in northeastern Dzungaria and Jetisu.

The conflict brought widespread devastation, heavy loss of life, and hardship to the affected population. Many Kazakh leaders held Amursana responsible for the outbreak of hostilities between the Kazakhs and the Qing Empire and therefore withheld substantial support from him and his followers. Amursana, for his part, remained wary of the Kazakhs. In the autumn of 1756, he departed from the Middle Jüz and sought refuge among the Altai Uriankhai.

The Kazakh forces of Ablai sent to accompany Amursana played an increasingly large role. In some cases, the number of Kazakh warriors exceeded the Dzungars. Initially, the forces of the rebels and the Qing Empire were vastly unequal, but the Dzungars and Kazakhs inflicted a series of crushing defeats on Qing troops. Enraged by the fierce resistance of a recently conquered people, the Qing authorities resorted to genocide—the mass extermination of the Dzungars, during which hundreds of thousands of Oirats perished. However, owing to the Qing Empire’s overwhelming numerical and technological superiority, Ablai was compelled to cease military operations in the summer of 1757 and enter negotiations with the Qing to establish peaceful and cooperative relations with the new southeastern neighbor. After Amursana’s escape to Russia, peace was concluded between the Qing and the Kazakhs.

After losing all of his remaining allies, Amursana attempted to secure Russian support, offering to accept Russian protection in exchange for the construction of a fortress between the Irtysh River and Lake Zaisan that could serve as a base of operations against the Qing. The Russian authorities declined, seeking to avoid any action that might provoke a war with the Qing Empire, and instead proposed that he settle on the Volga alongside other Kalmyk groups. In early 1757, the Qing commander Zhaohui reported that Amursana had withdrawn from the Russian frontier. Unaware of Chingünjav's fate, Amursana moved eastward in an attempt to reunite with his remaining forces. The Qianlong Emperor viewed this as an opportunity to capture him and ordered the pursuit to continue despite the harsh winter conditions, dividing the Qing forces into several detachments to track him down. Believing that existing treaty obligations would prevent Russia from granting him refuge, the emperor assumed that Amursana had few options for escape.

Amursana died of smallpox in Russian lands in September 1757. In the spring of 1762, his frozen body was brought to Kyakhta for the Manchu to see. The Russians then buried it, refusing the Manchu request that it be handed over for posthumous punishment. The collapse of the Dzungar Khanate caused considerable anxiety among the ruling circles of Russia, which until the 1790s seriously feared an invasion of Russian territory by the Qing army.

Later encounters took place with the remaining Dzungar forces, in the Battle of Khorgos, in which the partisans of Amursana were defeated in 1758 by Prince Cäbdan-jab. Again in 1758, at the Battle of Khurungui, General Zhaohui ambushed and defeated the Dzungarian forces on Mount Khurungui, near Almaty, Kazakhstan.

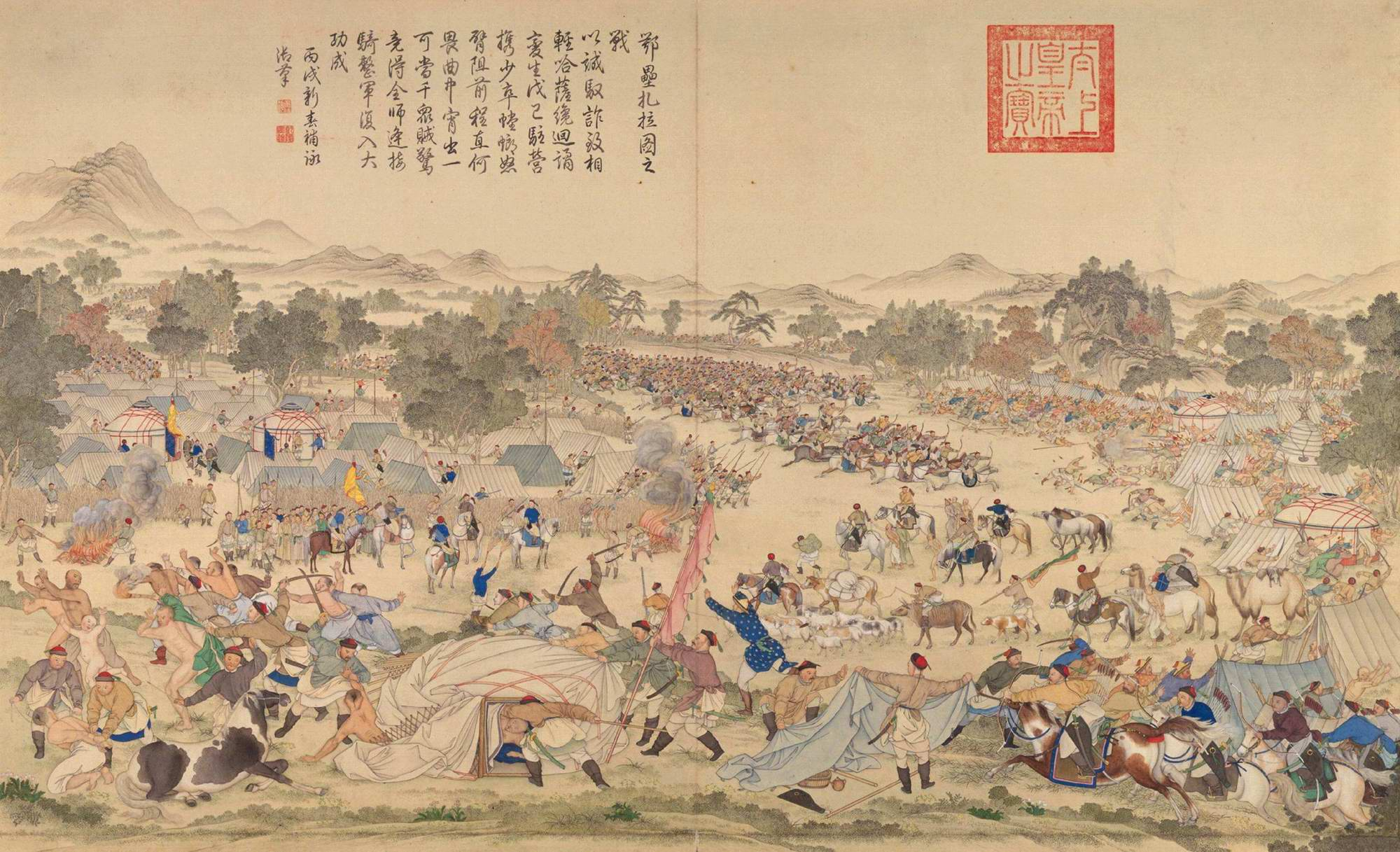
The Battle of Oroi-Jalatu, 1756. Chinese general, Zhaohui attacked the Dzungars at night in the present Wusu, Xinjiang. Painting by Giuseppe Castiglione.

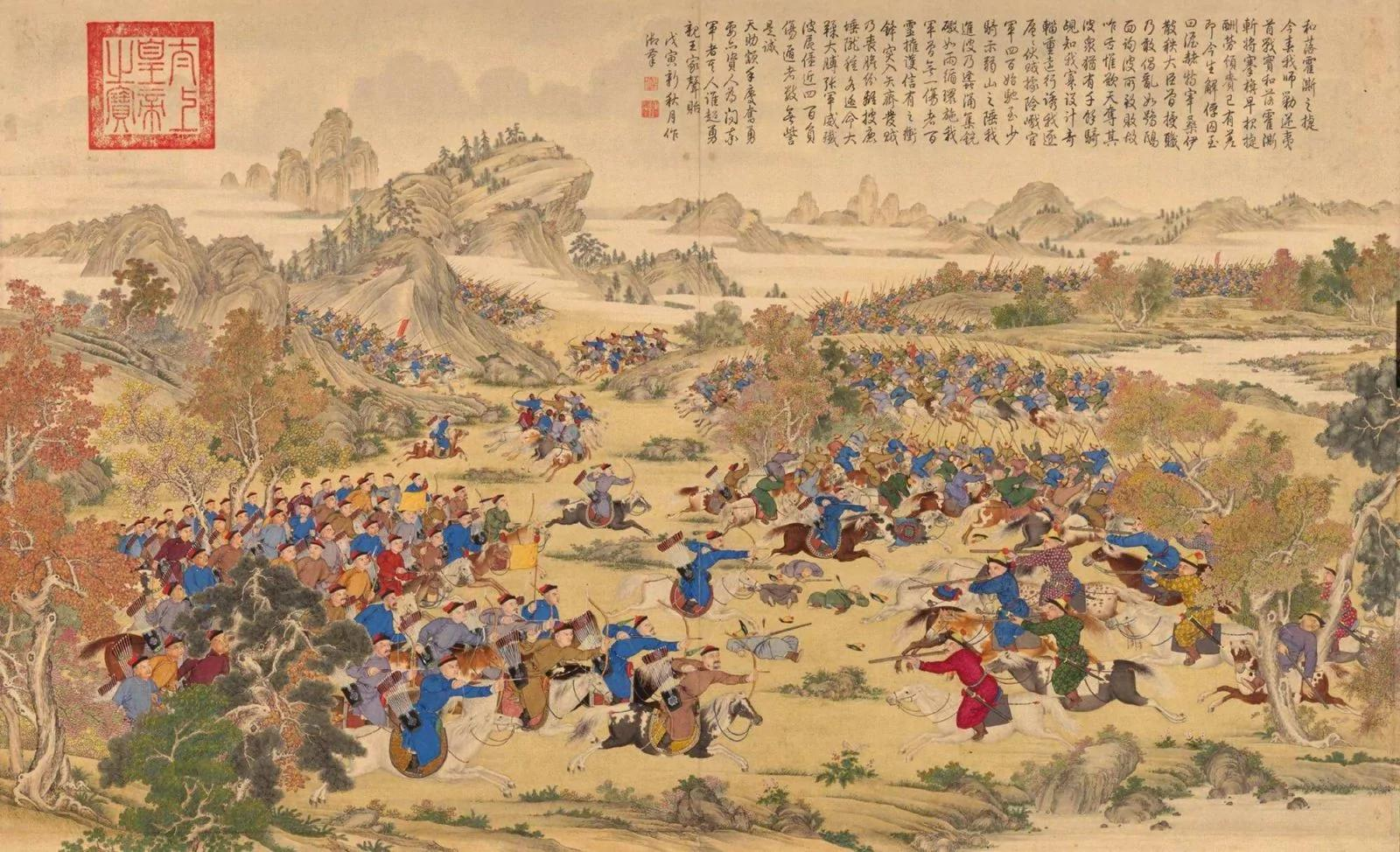
"The Victory of Khorgos". The partisans of Amursana were defeated in 1758 by Prince Cäbdan-jab. Painting by Jean Denis Attiret.

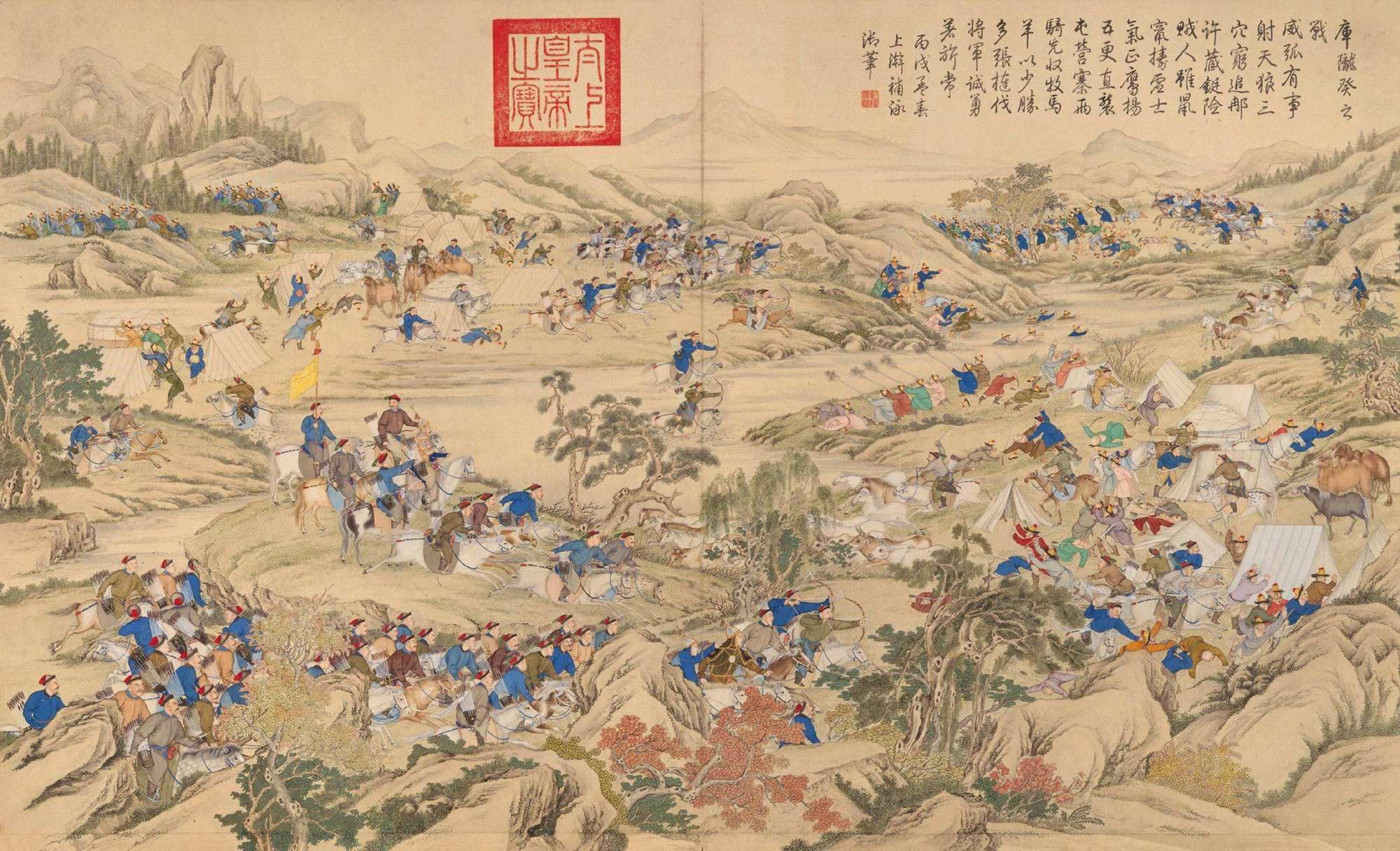
Battle of Khurungui, 1758. General Zhaohui ambushes and defeats the Dzungar partisans of Amursana on Mount Khurungui (near Almaty, Kazakhstan). Painted by Jean-Damascène Sallusti.

=== Aq Taghliq rebellion (1757–1759) ===
When Amursana rebelled against the Qing dynasty, the Aq Taghliq (i.e., 'White Mountaineers', also known as Āfāqīs) Khojas Burhanuddin and Jahan rebelled in Yarkand. Their rule was not popular, and the people greatly disliked them for appropriating anything they needed, from clothing to livestock. In February 1758, the Qing sent Yaerhashan and Zhao Hui with 10,000 troops against the Aq Taghliq regime. Zhao Hui was besieged by enemy forces at Yarkand until January 1759, but otherwise the Qing army did not encounter any difficulties on campaign. The Khoja brothers fled to Badakhshan, where they were captured by the ruler Sultan Shah, who executed them and handed Jahan's head to the Qing. The Tarim Basin was pacified in 1759.

=== Genocide ===
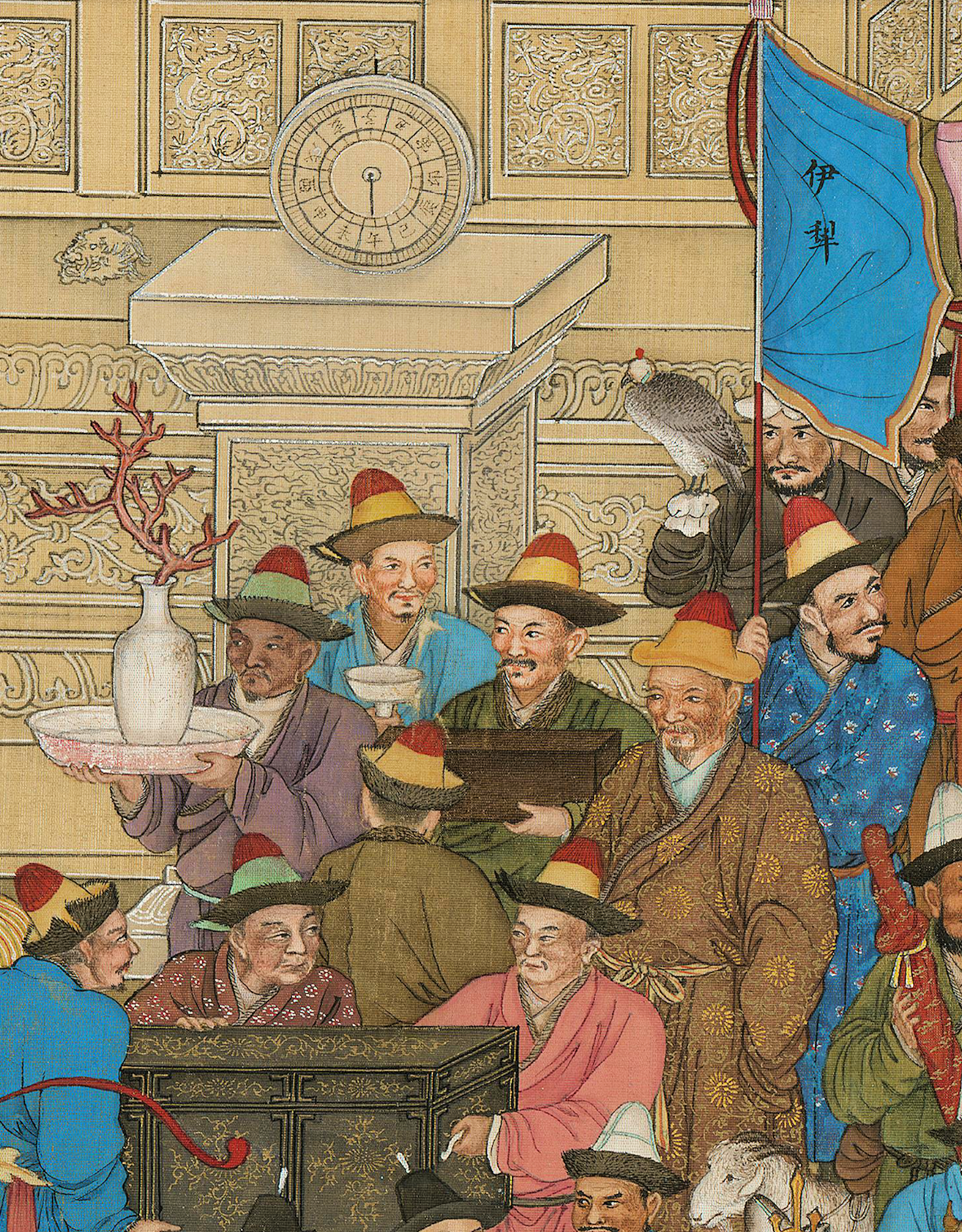
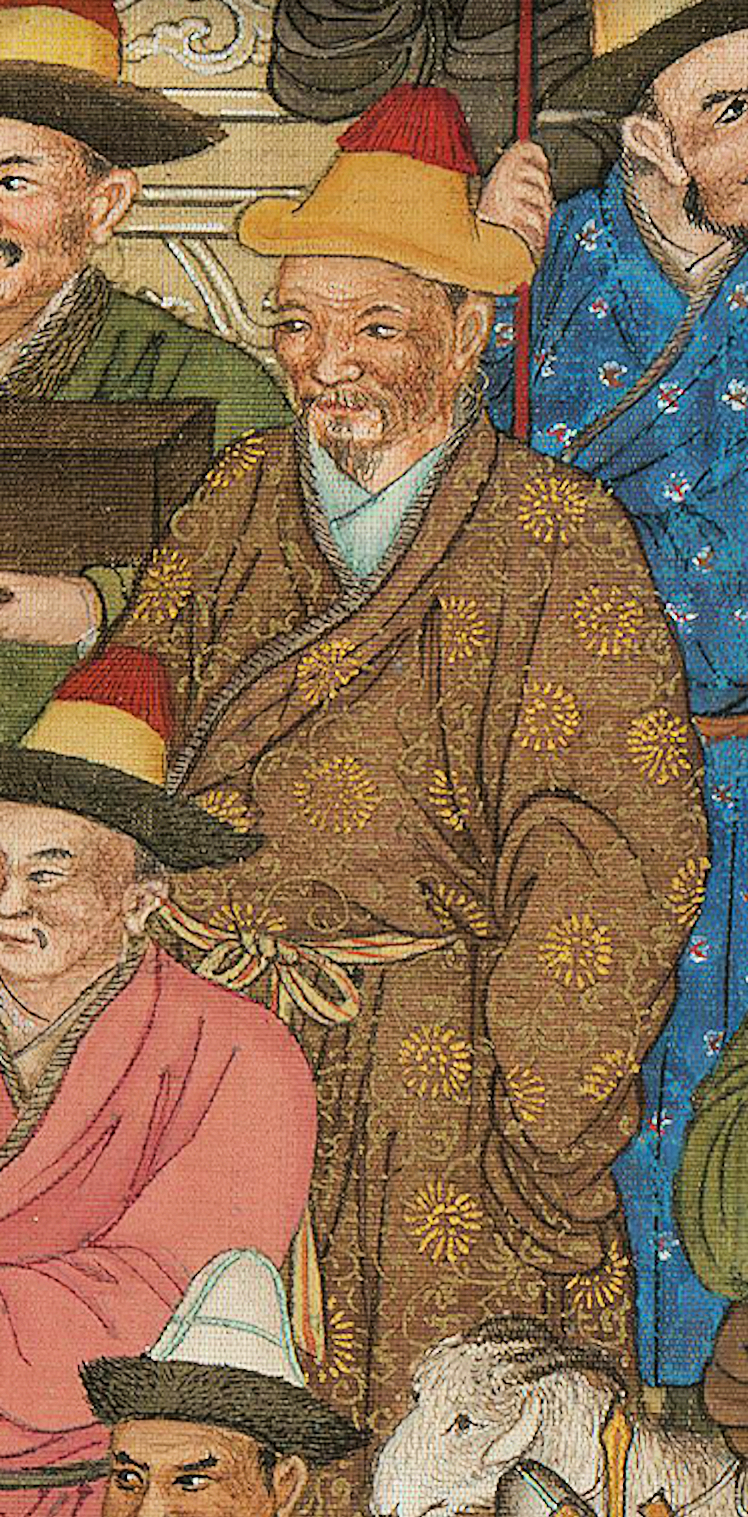
Dzungar delegates from the Ili region (flag with "伊犁", Ili) at the Forbidden City in Beijing, China, to bring tribute to the Qianlong Emperor, in 1761. 万国来朝图.

According to the Qing scholar Wei Yuan (1794–1857), the Dzungar population before the Qing conquest was around 600,000 in 200,000 households. Wei Yuan wrote that about 40 percent of the Dzungar households were killed by smallpox, 20 percent fled to Russia or Kazakh tribes, and 30 percent were killed by Manchu bannermen. For several thousands of li, there were no gers except for those who had surrendered. Wen-Djang Chu wrote that 80 percent of the 600,000 or more Dzungars were destroyed by disease and attack which Michael Clarke described as "the complete destruction of not only the Dzungar state but of the Dzungars as a people".

It's argued by the historian Peter Perdue that the destruction of the Dzungars was the result of an explicit policy of extermination launched by the Qianlong Emperor, which lasted for two years. His commanders were reluctant to carry out his orders, which he repeated several times using the term jiao (extermination) over and over again. The commanders Hadaha and Agui were punished for only occupying Dzungar lands but letting the people escape. The generals Jaohui and Shuhede were punished for not showing sufficient zeal in exterminating rebels. Qianlong explicitly ordered the Khalkha Mongols to "take the young and strong and massacre them". The elderly, children, and women were spared, but they could not preserve their former names or titles. Mark Levene, a historian whose recent research interests focus on genocide, states that the extermination of the Dzungars was "arguably the eighteenth century genocide par excellence".

Widespread anti-Dzungar opinion by former Dzungar subjects contributed to their genocide. The Muslim Kazakhs and former people of the Yarkent Khanate in the Tarim Basin (now called Uyghurs), were treated poorly by their Buddhist Dzungar rulers, who used them as slave labor; in consequence, they participated in the Qing invasion and attacked the Dzungars. Uyghur leaders like Khoja Emin or Khojis were granted titles within the Qing nobility, and acted as intermediaries with Muslims from the Tarim Basin. They told the Muslims that the Qing only wanted to kill Oirats and that they would leave the Muslims alone. They also convinced the Muslims to aid the Qing in killing Oirats.

=== Demographic change in Xinjiang ===
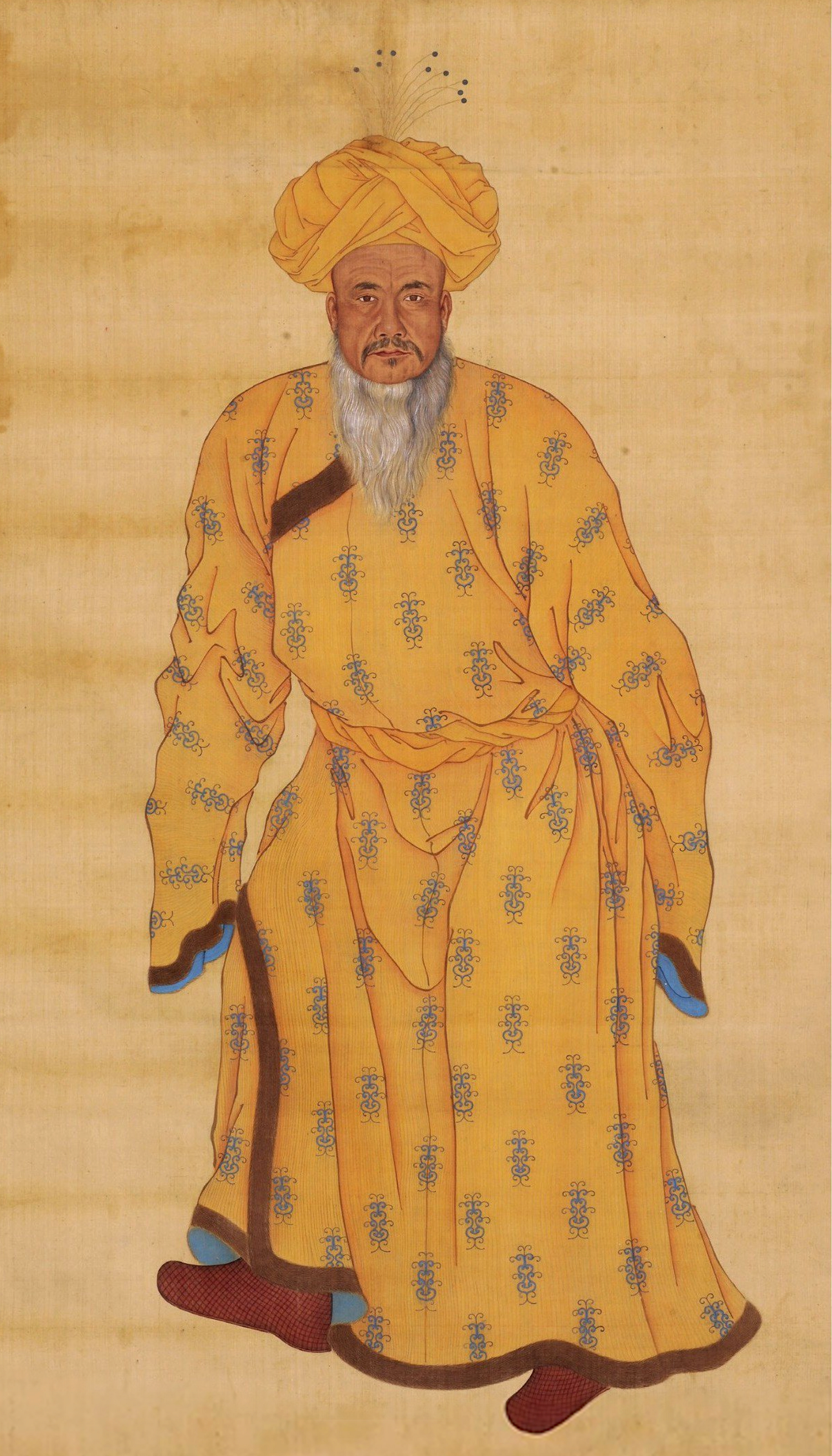
Khojis (–1781), a Uyghur governor of Us-Turfan. Painting by Ignatius Sichelbart, a European Jesuit artist at the Chinese court in 1775.

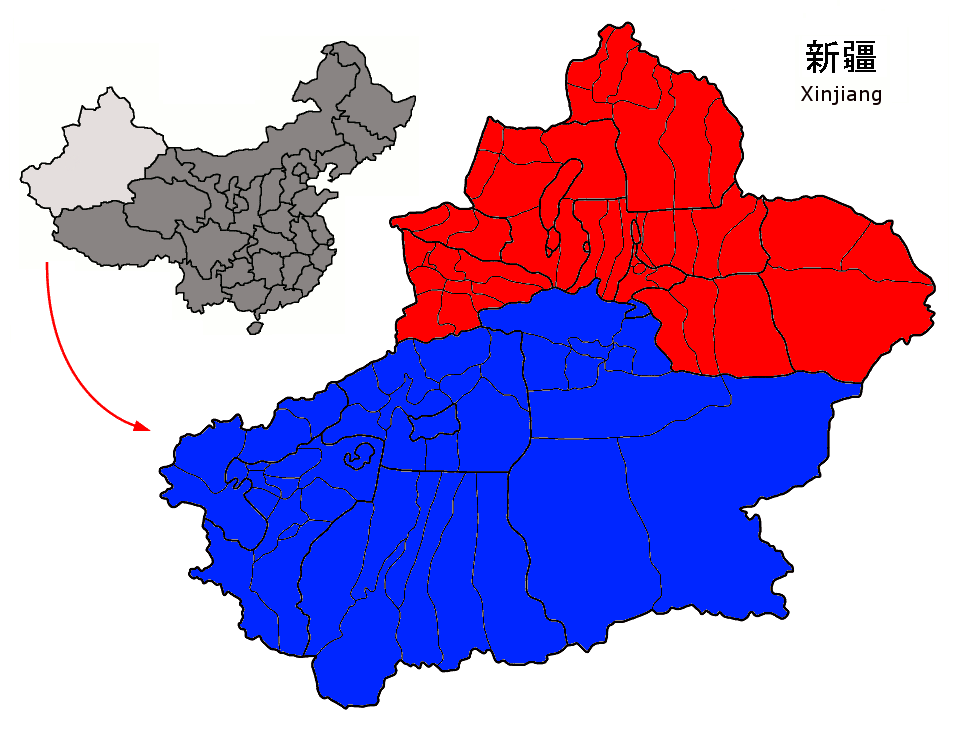
Dzungaria Tarim Basin

After the destruction of the Dzungar Oirat people, the Qing dynasty sponsored the settlement of millions of Han, Hui, Xibe, Daur, Solon, Turkic Oasis people (Uyghurs), and Manchus in Dzungaria since the land had been emptied. Stanley W. Toops notes that modern Xinjiang's demographic situation still reflects the settlement initiative of the Qing dynasty. One third of Xinjiang's total population consisted of Han, Hui, and Kazakhs in the north, while around two-thirds were Uyghurs in southern Xinjiang's Tarim Basin. Some cities in northern Xinjiang, such as Ürümqi and Yining, were essentially made by the Qing settlement policy.

The elimination of the Buddhist Dzungars led to the rise of Islam and its Muslim Begs as the predominant moral and political authority in Xinjiang. Many Muslim Taranchis also moved to northern Xinjiang. According to Henry Schwarz, "the Qing victory was, in a certain sense, a victory for Islam". Ironically, the destruction of the Dzungars by the Qing led to the consolidation of Turkic Muslim power in the region, since Turkic Muslim culture and identity were tolerated or even promoted by the Qing.

In 1759, the Qing dynasty proclaimed that the land formerly belonging to the Dzungars was now part of "China" (Dulimbai Gurun) in a Manchu memorial. The Qing ideology of unification portrayed the "outer" non-Han Chinese like the Mongols, Oirats, and Tibetans together with the "inner" Han Chinese as "one family" united in the Qing state. The Qing described the phrase "Zhong Wai Yi Jia" (中外一家) or "Nei Wai Yi Jia" (內外一家, "interior and exterior as one family"), to convey this idea of "unification" to different peoples.

=== Paintings ===
The Qianlong Emperor took great care to document his successes in the war. He ordered the painting of the 100 most meritorious servitors of the Qing (Statues of Meritorious Officials in the Ziguang Pavilion: brave Qing officers, generals, and also a few Torghut and Dörbet allies, as well as vanquished Choros Oirats, or Muslim Uyghur allies such as Khojis or Emin Khoja), as well as paintings of the battle scenes whenever the Qing succeeded. The faces are in a Western realistic style, while the bodies were probably drawn by Chinese court artists. According to contemporary Jesuit painter Jean-Denis Attiret: "During the whole duration of this war against the Eleuths and other Tartars, their allies, whenever the imperial troops gained some victories, the painters were ordered to paint them. Those of the most important officers who had played the decisive roles in the events were favoured to appear in the paintings according to what really had happened". These paintings were all made by foreign artists, specifically the Jesuits under Giuseppe Castiglione, and Chinese court-painters under their direction.

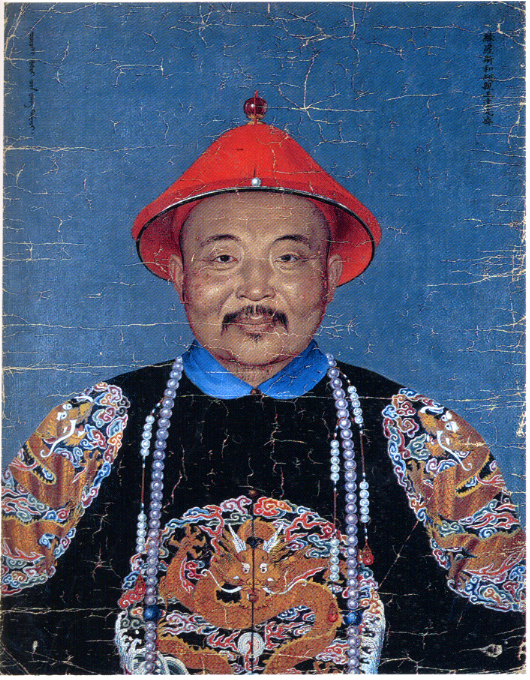
The Choros-Oirat leader Dawachi in Qing costume, after the Dzungar-Qing War. Painting by Jean Denis Attiret.

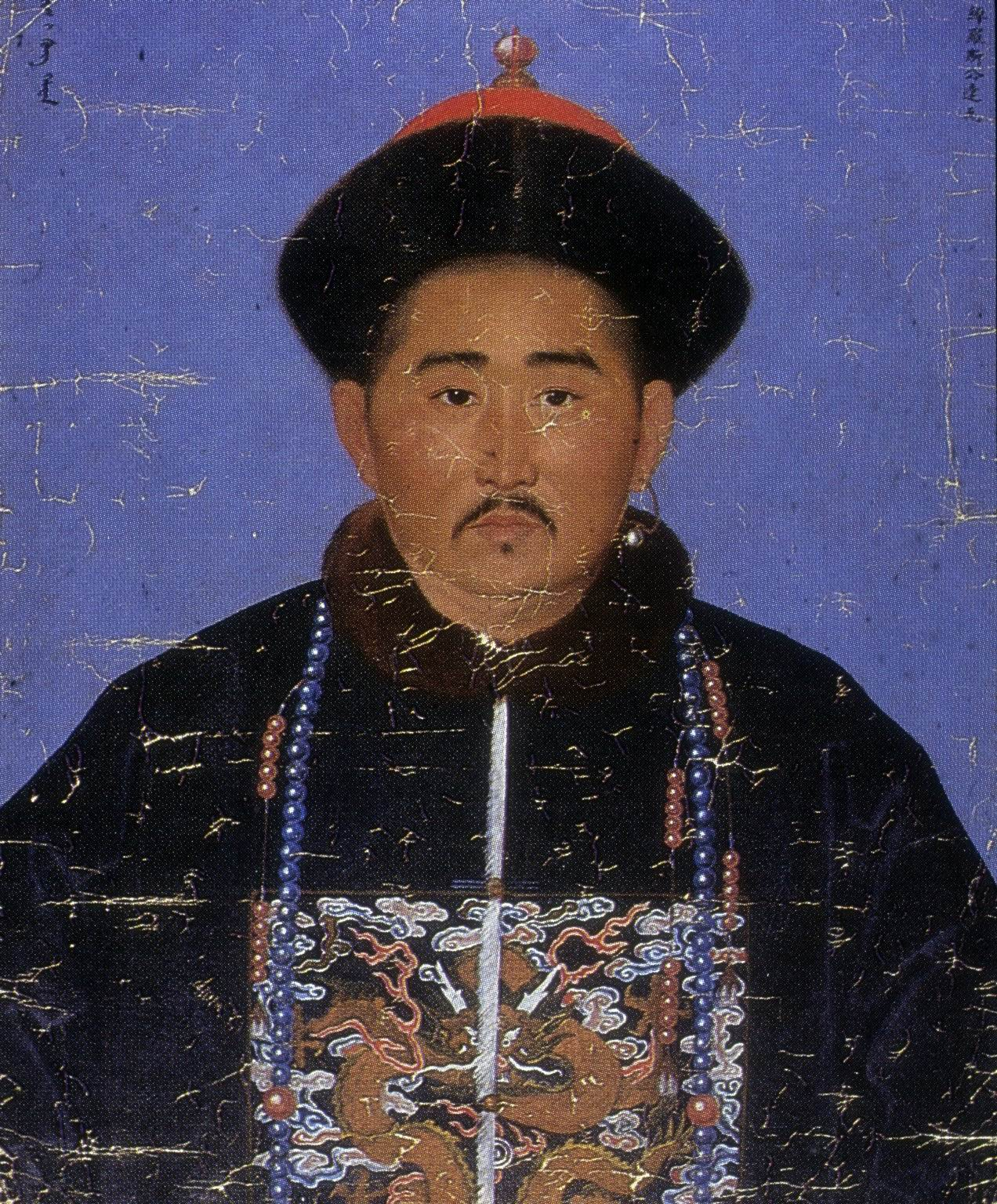
The Choros-Oirat Dawa (达瓦) in Qing costume, after the Dzungar-Qing War. Painting by Jean Denis Attiret.

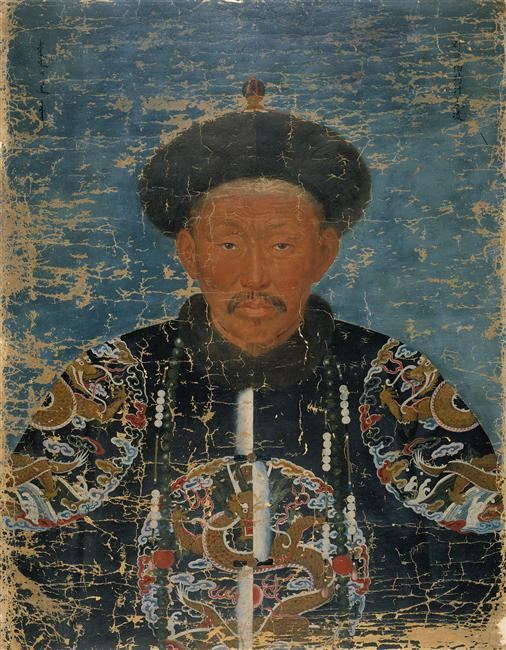
The Dörbet Oirat Tseren (车凌) in Qing dynasty costume. Painting by Jean Denis Attiret.

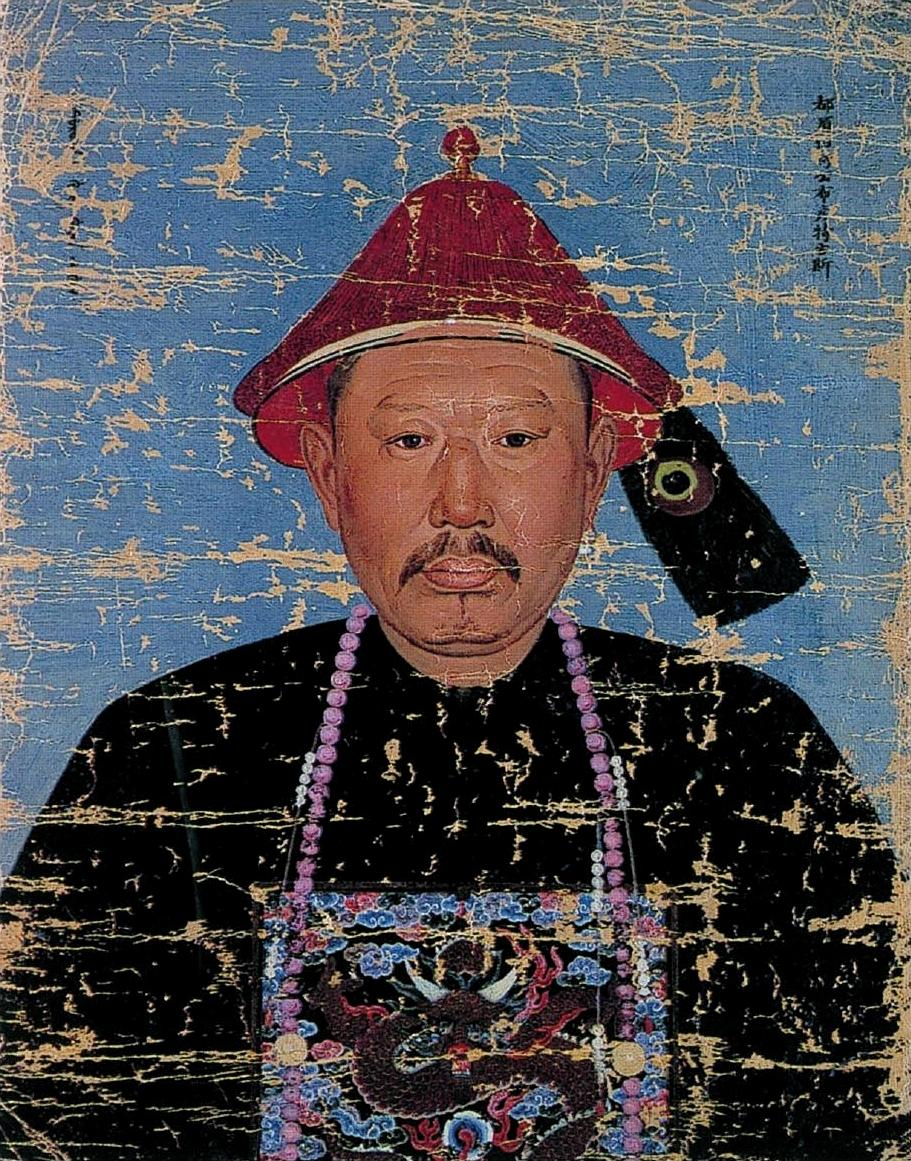
The Dörbet Oirat Buyan Tegus in Qing dynasty costume. Painting by Jean Denis Attiret.

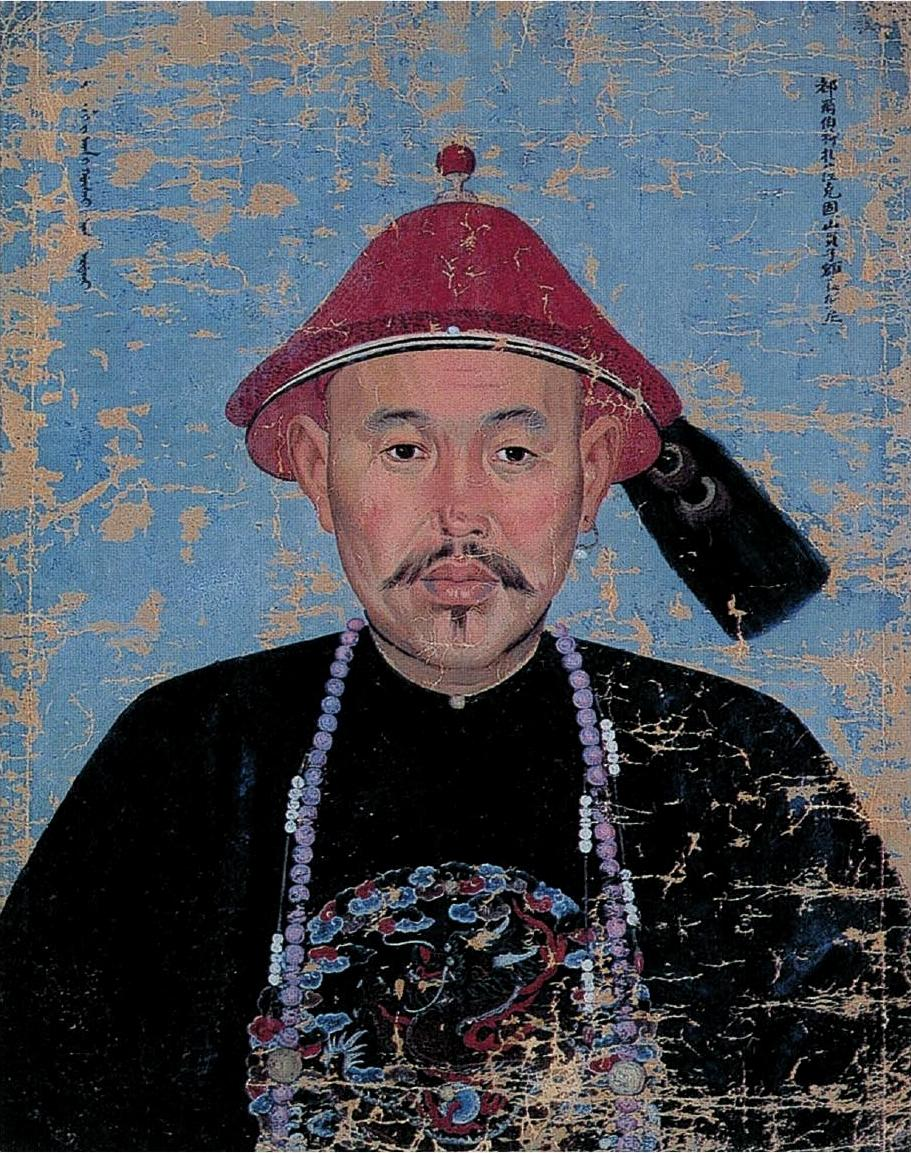
The Dörbet Oirat Erdeni (额爾德尼) in Qing dynasty costume. Painting by Jean Denis Attiret.

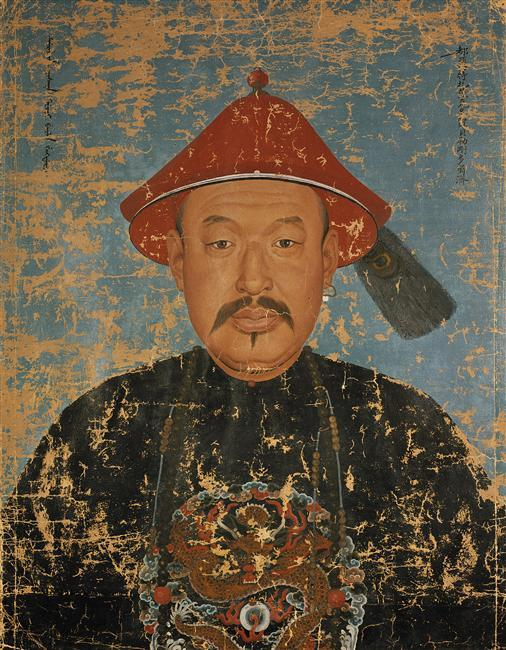
The Dörbet Oirat Gangdorji (刚多尔济) in Qing dynasty costume. Painting by Jean Denis Attiret.

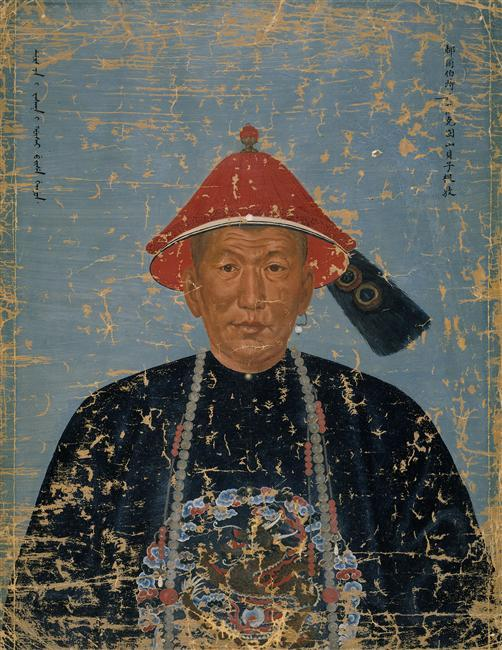
The Dörbet Oirat Gendun (根敦) in Qing dynasty costume. Painting by Jean Denis Attiret.

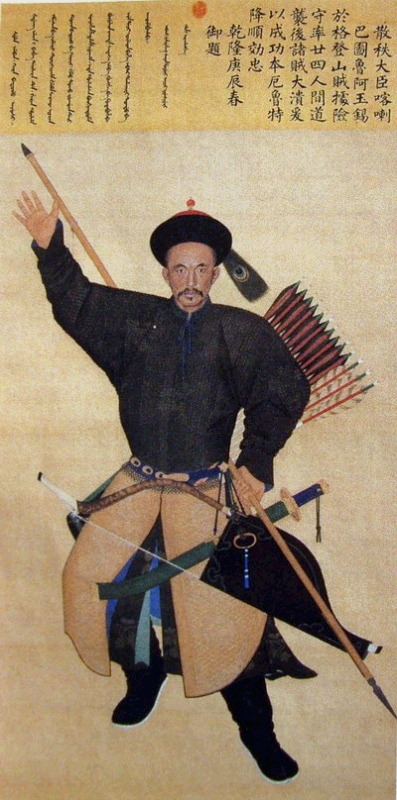
The Oirat renegade Ayusi in his Qing uniform. Painting by Giuseppe Castiglione.

== Leaders ==
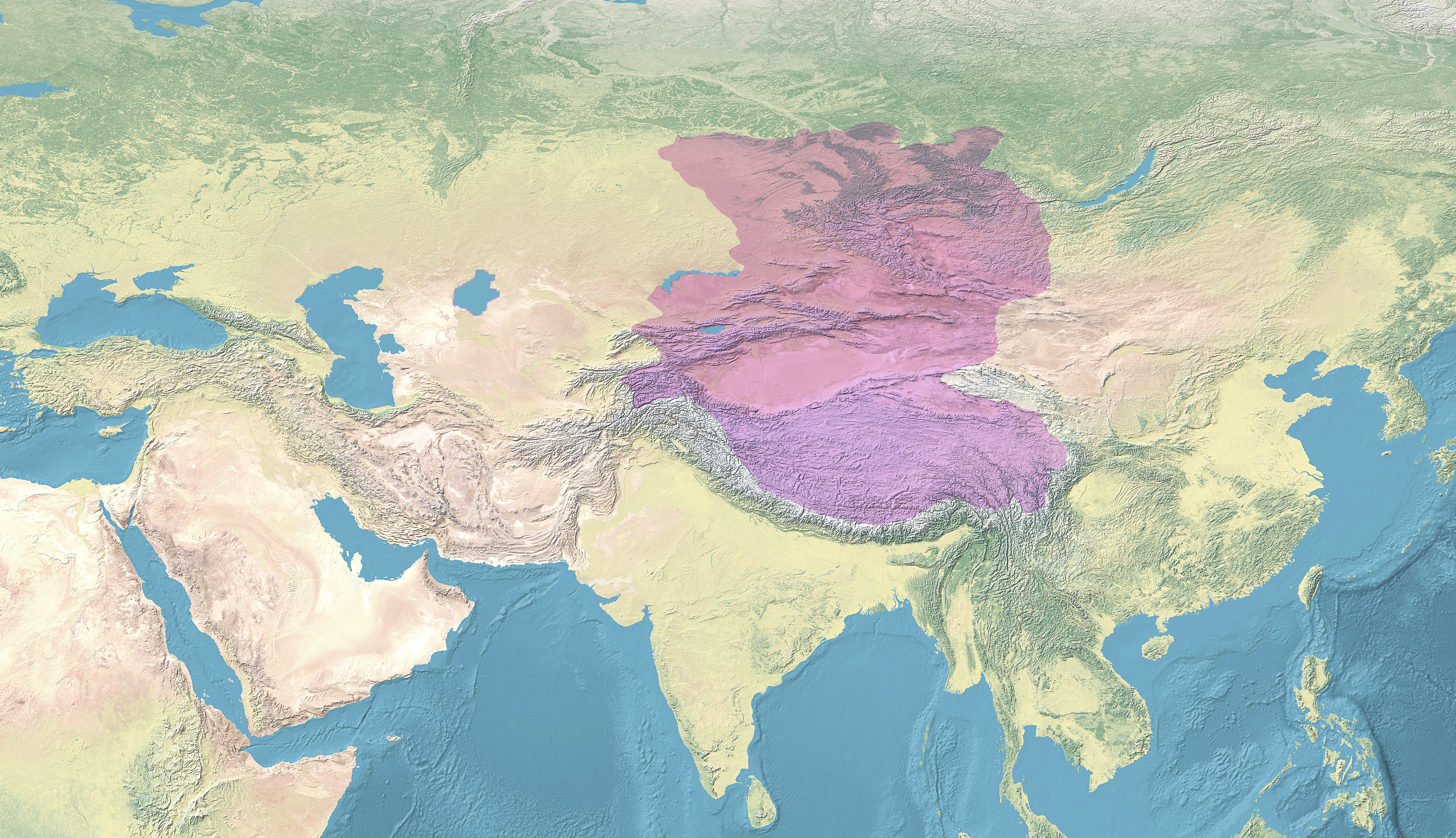
Dzungar Khanate in the year 1717, and main contemporary polities
- Kharkhul, title: Khong Tayiji
- Erdeni Batur, title: Batur Khong Tayiji
- Sengge, title: Khong Tayiji
- Galdan Boshugtu Khan, titles: Khong Tayiji, Boshogtu Khan
- Tsewang Rabtan Khan, title: Khong Tayiji, Khan
- Galdan Tseren Khan, title: Khong Tayiji, Khan
- Tsewang Dorji Namjal, title: Khong Tayiji
- Lama Dorji, title: Khong Tayiji
- Dawachi, title: Khong Tayiji
- Amursana title: Jiangjun, (Note: The word Jiangjun refers to General.) Khan (of the Khoid)‡

‡ Note: Although Amursana had sought to become Khan of the Dzungar Khanate, Qianlong Emperor made him the Khan of his clan, the Khoid.

== Culture ==
The Oirats were once the most powerful nomadic horsemen in the steppes of Inner Asia during the post-Mongol period. The Oirats rose to prominence under charismatic leaders such as Esen Taishi (r. 1439–1455) and Galdan Boshugtu Khan (r. 1671–1697), who forged powerful—though ultimately short-lived nomadic empires, which harassed their neighboring Chinggisid polities, including the Northern Yuan (1368-1691), Moghul Khanate (1347-1680s), the Uzbek Khanate (1501–1747), and the Kazakh Khanate (1450s–1848). From the mid-seventeenth century onward, the Oirats of the Volga region, known as the Kalmyks, alone menaced their nomadic neighbor, such as the Nogais and Tatars.

The Oirats converted to Tibetan Buddhism in 1615.

Oirat society was similar to other nomadic societies. It was heavily dependent on animal husbandry, but also practiced limited agriculture. After the conquest of the Yarkent Khanate in 1680, they used people from the Tarim Basin (taranchi) as slave labour to cultivate land in Dzungaria. The Dzungar economy and industry were fairly complex for a nomadic society. They had iron, copper, and silver mines producing raw ore, which the Dzungars made into weapons and shields, including even firearms, bullets, and other utensils. The Dzungars were able to indigenously manufacture firearms to a degree that was unique in Central Asia at the time. In 1762, the Qing army discovered four large Dzungar bronze cannons, eight "soaring" cannons, and 10,000 shells.

In 1640, the Oirats created an Oirat Mongol Legal Code, which regulated the tribes and gave support to the Gelug Yellow Hat sect. Erdeni Batur assisted Zaya Pandita in creating the Clear Script.

== Maps ==
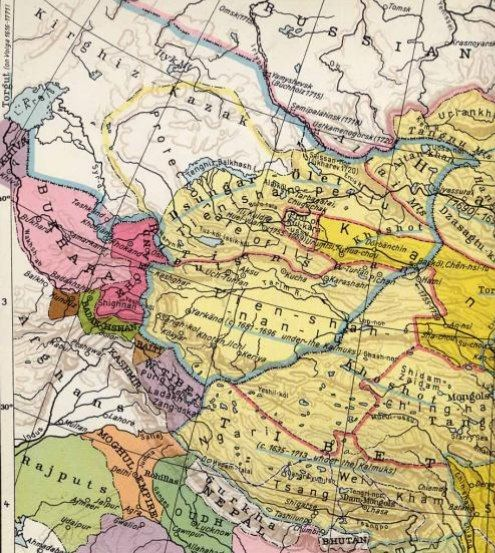
The Dzungar Khanate in 1760

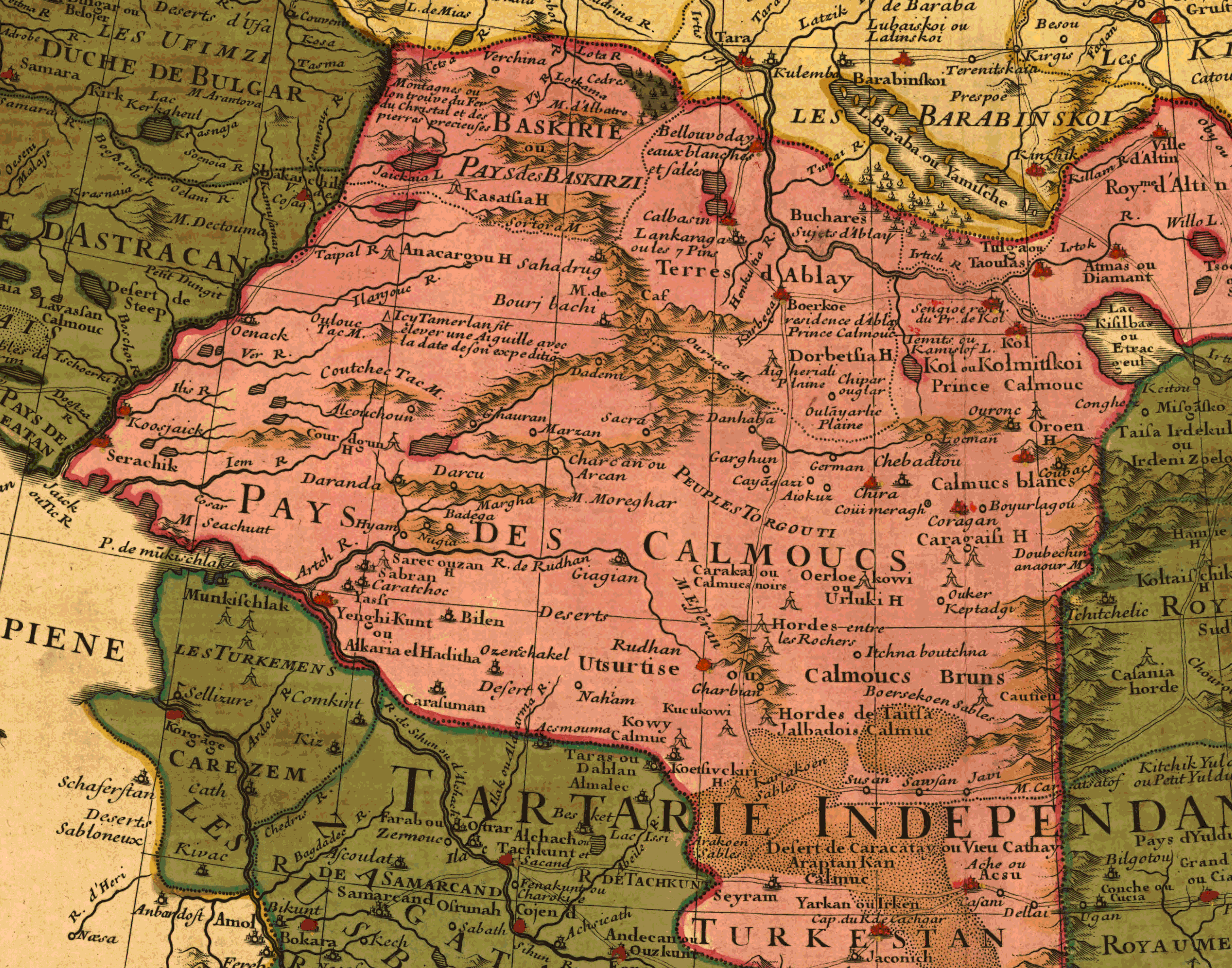
This map fragment shows territories of Oirats as in 1706 (Map Collection of the Library of Congress: "Carte de Tartarie" of Guillaume de L'Isle (1675–1726)).

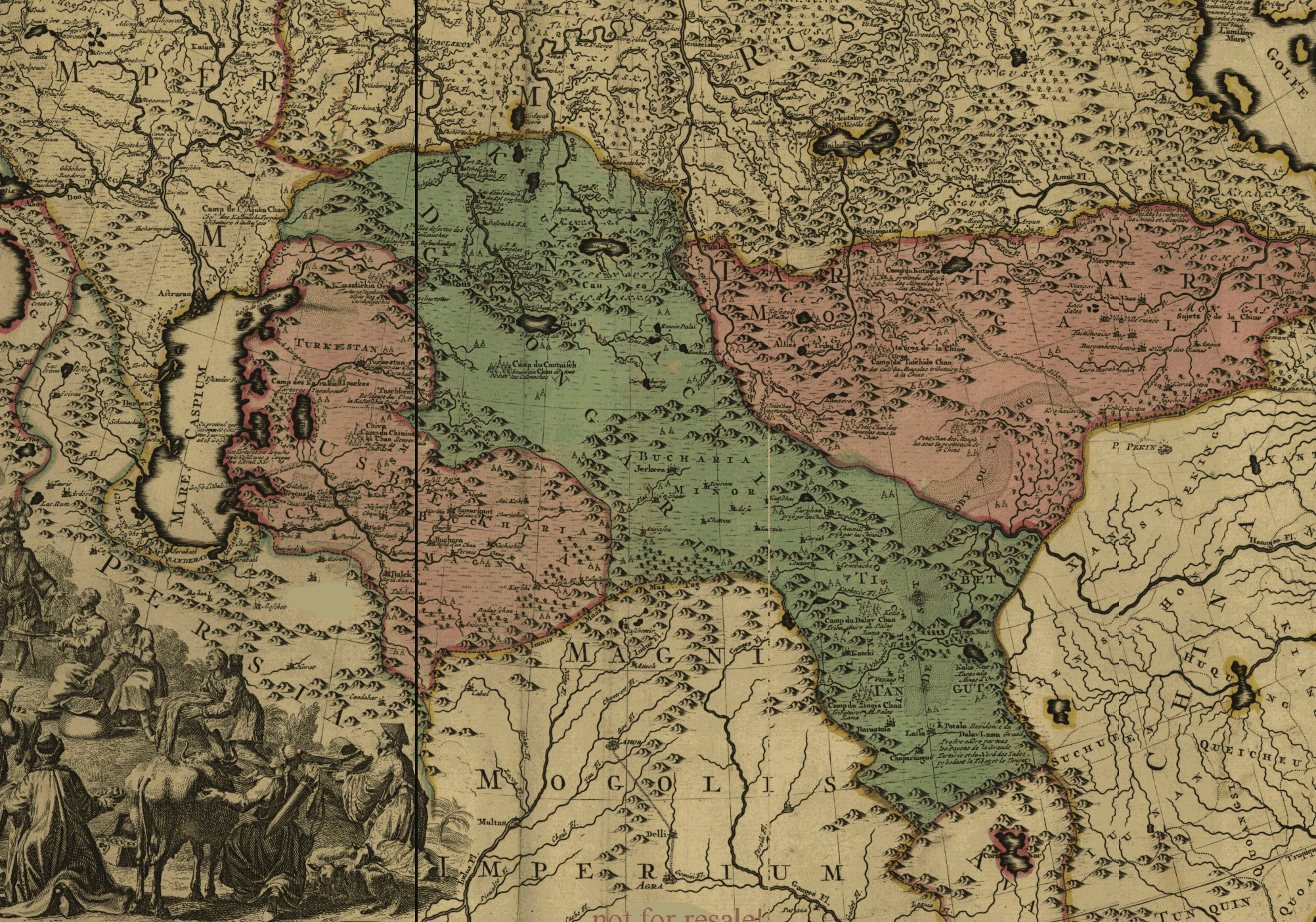
The Dzungar and Kalmyk states (a fragment of the map of the Russian Empire of Peter the Great, that was created by a Swedish soldier, Johan Renat in c. 1725)

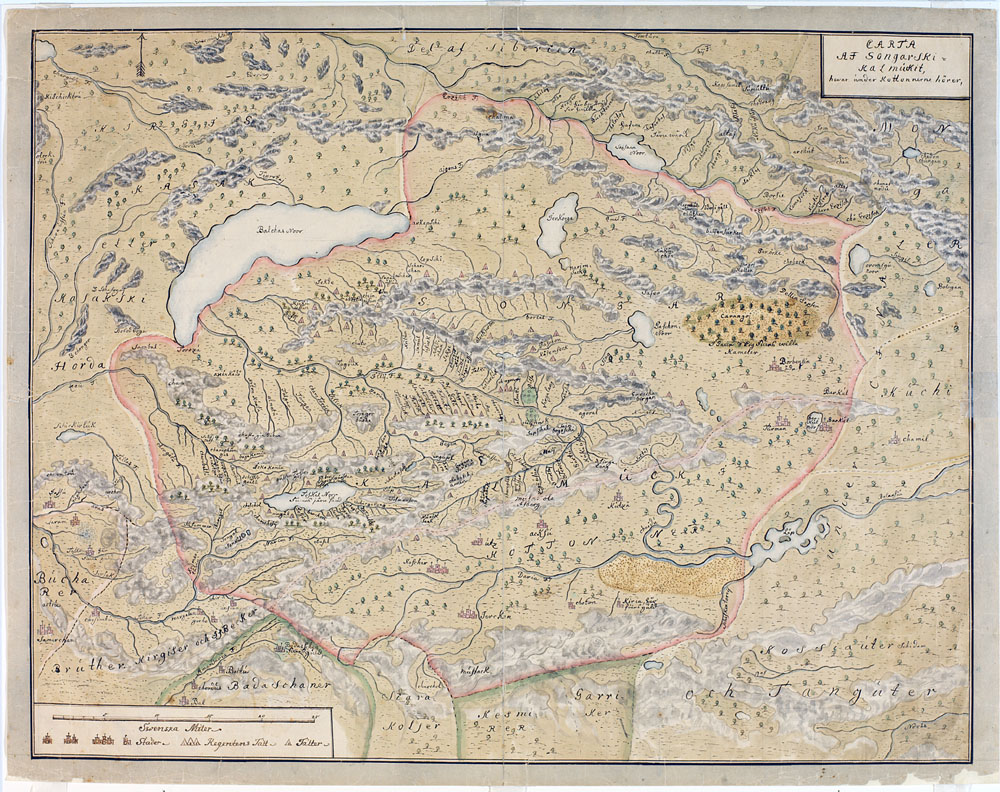
A map of the Dzungar Khanate, by a Swedish soldier, Johan Renat in captivity there from 1716 until 1733, which includes the region known today as Jetisu

== See also ==
- Dzungaria
- Dzungar people
- Khoshut Khanate
- Kalmyk Khanate
- Tibet–Ladakh–Mughal War
