= Battle of Chu and Talas (1658) =

Part of the First Kazakh-Dzungar War

Battle of Chu & Talas
- Part of Uzbek–Oirat conflicts
Date	1658
Location	Chu river, Talas river, Kazakhstan
Result	Dzungar victory

Belligerents
Khanate of Bukhara	Dzungar Khanate; Khoshut Khanate

Commanders and leaders
(Khanate of Bukhara) Abushuker Noyan †	(Khoshut Khanate) Galdamba Batur

Strength
38,000	3,000

The Battle of Chu & Talas was a military battle between the Khanate of Bukhara, seeking to relieve the Kazakh Khanate, from the invading Dzungar Khanate in 1658. During the Kazakh–Dzungar War (1635–1658), Galdamba Batur — who had joined against the Kazakhs after Erdeni Batur requested for assistance from the Khoshut Khanate. In 1652, he fought Salqam Jangir Khan at Turkistan, in which Jangir was killed in battle, and the Kazakh army possibly faced a huge casualty. After that, Galdamba had campaigned on the Kazakh Khanate — until a relief force arrived from Khanate of Bukhara. In 1658, Abushukher — the commander of the Uzbek relief force attacked on the Dzungar camp on the Talas River with a 38,000-strong army. Galdama attacked the Bukharan army and pursued the Bukharans to the mouth of the Chu River, where he killed Khan Abushukher himself. After the battle, the border of Kazakh Khanate and Dzungar Khanate was set in the Ayagoz river to the Talas River, in which after the war – successor of Jangir, Tauke Khan had made peaceful relations with the Dzungar ruler, Sengge, until the succession of Galdan Boshughtu Khan.
