= Dzungar people =

Ethnic group descending from the Oirat Mongol tribes

Dzungars
ᠴᡈᡉᠨ ᡎᠠᠷ Zöün ɣar ᠵᠡᠭᠦᠨᠭᠠᠷ Зүүнгар Züüngar
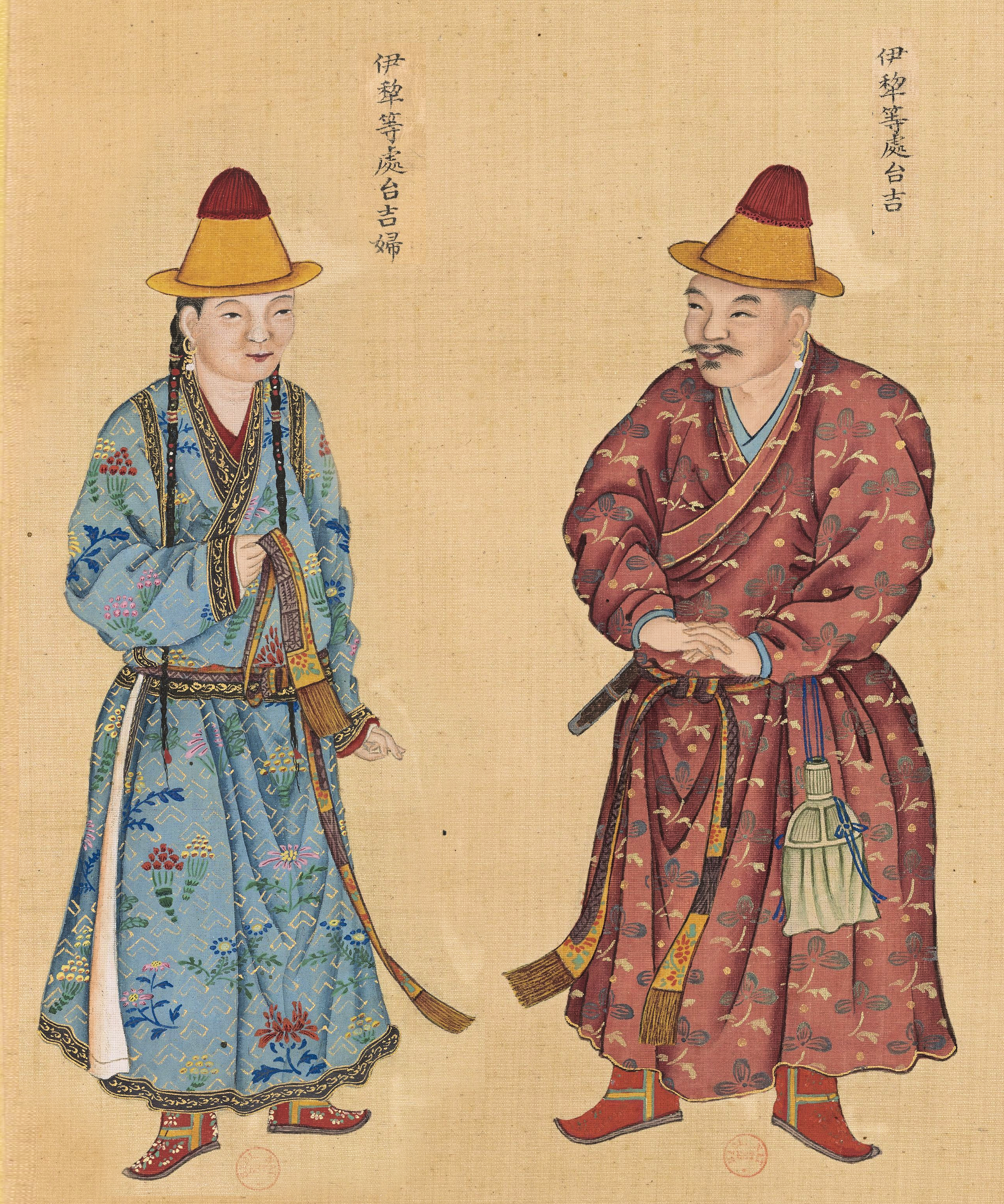
- Mongol Prince (Taiji) from Ili and other regions and his wife, Huang Qing Zhigong Tu, 1769.

Total population
- 658,372-668,372

Regions with significant populations
- China: 250,000 (2013 estimate)
- Mongolia: 205,000 (2010 census)
- Russia: 183,372 (Kalmyk)
- Kyrgyzstan: 12,000 (Kalmyk)
- Ukraine: 325 (Kalmyk)
- United States: 1,500 (Kalmyk)

Languages
- Oirat, Chagatai

Religion
- Tibetan Buddhism

Dzungar people

Chinese name
- Traditional Chinese: 準噶爾
- Simplified Chinese: 准噶尔
Transcriptions
Standard Mandarin
- Hanyu Pinyin: Zhǔngá'ěr
- Gwoyeu Romatzyh: Joengar'eel
- Wade–Giles: Chun^{3}-ka^{2}-êrh^{3}
- IPA: [ʈʂwə̀n.kǎ.àɚ]

Mongolian name
- Mongolian Cyrillic: Зүүнгар, Mongolian pronunciation: [tsuːŋˈɢɑr]
- Mongolian script: ᠵᠡᠭᠦᠨᠭᠠᠷ
Transcriptions
- SASM/GNC: Jegünγar

Kazakh name
- Kazakh: Жоңғар [ʑwʊɴˈʁɑɾ] Joñğar جوڭعار

Oirat name
- Oirat: ᠴᡈᡉᠨ ᡎᠠᠷ zöün ɣar

The Dzungar people (also written as Zunghar or Junggar; from the Mongolian words züün gar, meaning 'left hand') are the many Mongol Oirat tribes who formed and maintained the Dzungar Khanate in the 17th and 18th centuries. Historically, they were one of the major tribes of the Four Oirat confederation. They were also known as the Eleuths or Ööled, from the Qing dynasty euphemism for the hated word "Dzungar", and as the "Kalmyks". In 2010, 15,520 people claimed "Ööled" ancestry in Mongolia. An unknown number also live in China, Russia and Kazakhstan.

== Origin ==
The Dzungars were a confederation of several Oirat tribes that emerged in the early 17th century to fight the Altan Khan of the Khalkha (not to be confused with the better-known Altan Khan of the Tümed), Tümen Zasagt Khan, and later the Manchu for dominion and control over the Mongolian people and territories. This confederation rose to power in what became known as the Junggar Basin in Dzungaria between the Altai Mountains and the Ili Valley. Initially, the confederation consisted of the Oöled, Dörbet Oirat (also written Derbet) and the Khoid. Later on, elements of the Khoshut and Torghut were forcibly incorporated into the Dzungar military, thus completing the reunification of the West Mongolian tribes.

According to oral history, the Oöled and Dörbet tribes are the successor tribes to the Naimans, a group of Mongols who roamed the steppes of Central Asia during the era of Genghis Khan. The Oöled shared the clan name Choros with the Dörbet. Zuun gar "left hand" and Baruun gar "right hand" formed the Oirat's military and administrative organization. The Dzungar Olot people and the Choros became the ruling clans in the 17th century.

== History ==
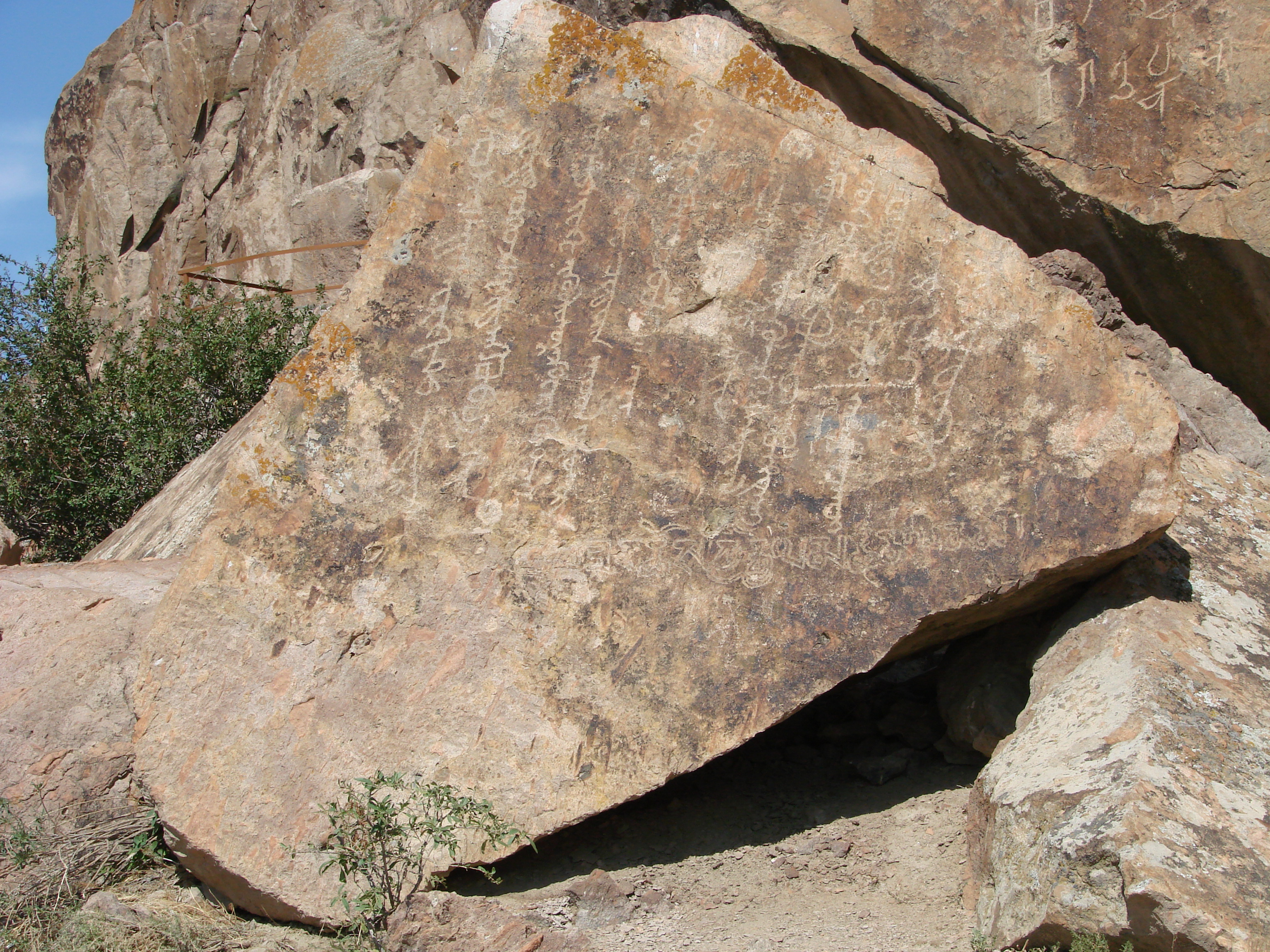
Clear script on rocks near Almaty

In 1697, two relatives of Galdan Boshugtu Khan, Danjila and Rabdan, surrendered to the Qing Kangxi Emperor. Their people were then organized into two Oolod banners and resettled in what is now Bayankhongor Province, Mongolia. In 1731, five hundred households fled back to Dzungar territory while the remaining Olots were deported to Hulunbuir. After 1761, some of them were resettled in Arkhangai Province.

The Dzungars who lived in an area that stretched from the west end of the Great Wall of China to present-day eastern Kazakhstan and from present-day northern Kyrgyzstan to southern Siberia (most of which is located in present-day Xinjiang), were the last nomadic empire to threaten China, which they did from the early 17th century through the middle of the 18th century.

During this time, the Dzungar pioneered the local manifestation of a ‘Military Revolution’ in Central Eurasia after perfecting a process of manufacturing indigenously created gunpowder weapons. They created a mixed agro-pastoral economy, as well as complementary mining and manufacturing industries on their lands. The Dzungar managed to enact an empire-wide system of laws and policies to boost the use of the Oirat language in the region.

After a series of inconclusive military conflicts that started in the 1680s, the Dzungars were subjugated by the Manchu-led Qing dynasty (1644–1911) in the late 1750s. Clarke argued that the Qing campaign in 1757–58 "amounted to the complete destruction of not only the Dzungar state but of the Dzungars as a people." After the Qianlong Emperor led Qing forces to victory over the Dzungar Oirat (Western) Mongols in 1755, he originally was going to split the Dzungar Khanate into four tribes headed by four Khans.

"Dzungar region" (準部) in Xinjiang in 1820

The Khoit tribe was to have the Dzungar leader Amursana as its Khan. Amursana rejected the Qing arrangement and rebelled since he wanted to be leader of a united Dzungar nation. Qianlong then issued his orders for the genocide and eradication of the entire Dzungar nation and name. Qing Manchu Bannermen and Khalkha (Eastern) Mongols enslaved Dzungar women and children while slaying the other Dzungars.

In 1755, the Qianlong Emperor ordered the genocide of the Dzungars, moving the remaining Dzungar people to the mainland and ordering the generals to kill all the men in Barkol or Suzhou, and divided their wives and children to Qing forces, which were made out of Manchu Bannermen and Khalkha Mongols. Qing scholar Wei Yuan estimated the total population of Dzungars before the fall at 600,000 people, or 200,000 households. Oirat officer Saaral betrayed and battled against the Oirats. In a widely cited account of the war, Wei Yuan wrote that about 40% of the Dzungar households were killed by smallpox, 20% fled to Russia or Kazakh tribes, and 30% were killed by the Qing army of Manchu Bannermen and Khalkhas, leaving no yurts in an area of several thousands li except those of the surrendered.

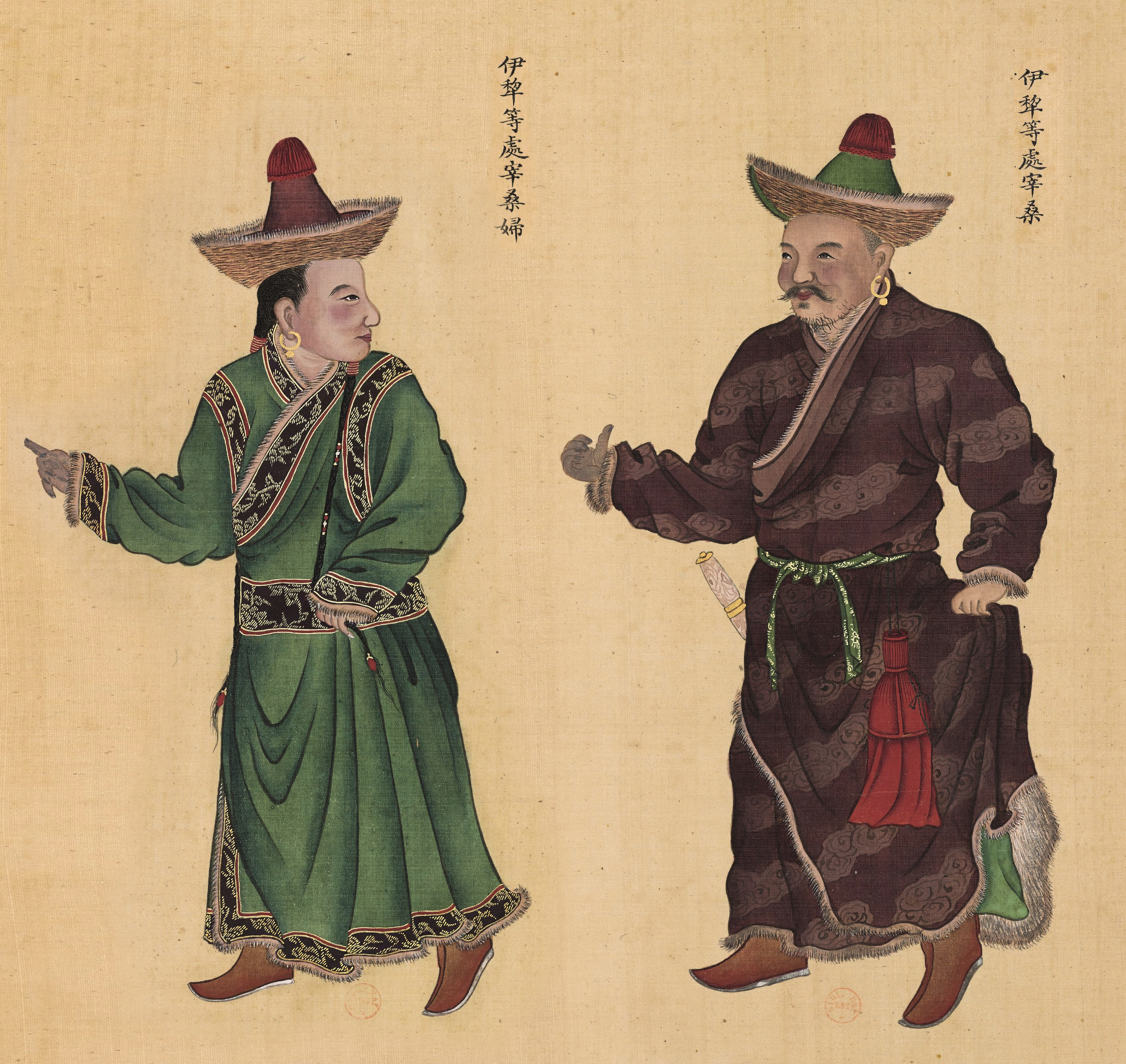
Mongol tribal leader (Zaisang, 宰桑) from Ili and other regions, with his wife. Huang Qing Zhigong Tu, 1769

During this war, Kazakhs attacked dispersed Oirats and Altays. Based on this account, Wen-Djang Chu wrote that 80% of the 600,000 or more Dzungars, especially Choros, Olots, Khoid, Baatud and Zakhchin, were destroyed by disease and attack which Michael Clarke described as "the complete destruction of not only the Dzungar state but of the Zungars as a people." Historian Peter Perdue attributed the devastation of the Dzungars to an explicit policy of extermination launched by Qianlong, but he also observed signs of a more lenient policy after mid-1757.

Mark Levene, a historian whose recent research interests focus on genocide, has stated that the extermination of the Dzungars was "arguably the eighteenth century genocide par excellence." The Dzungar genocide was completed by a combination of a smallpox epidemic and the direct slaughter of Dzungars by Qing forces made out of Manchu Bannermen and (Khalkha) Mongols.

Anti-Dzungar Uyghur rebels from the Turfan and Hami oases had submitted to Qing rule as vassals and requested Qing help for overthrowing Dzungar rule. Uyghur leaders like Emin Khoja were granted titles within the Qing nobility, and these Uyghurs helped supply the Qing military forces during the anti-Dzungar campaign. The Qing employed Khoja Emin in its campaign against the Dzungars and used him as an intermediary with Muslims from the Tarim Basin to inform them that the Qing were only aiming to kill Dzungars and that they would leave the Muslims alone, and also to convince them to kill the Dzungars themselves and side with the Qing since the Qing noted the Muslims' resentment of their former experience under Dzungar rule at the hands of Tsewang Rabtan.

It was not until generations later that Dzungaria rebounded from the destruction and near liquidation of the Dzungars after the mass slayings of nearly a million Dzungars. Historian Peter C. Perdue has shown that the annihilation of the Dzungars was the result of an explicit policy of extermination launched by Qianlong, Perdue attributed the elimination of the Dzungars to a "deliberate use of massacre" and has described it as an "ethnic genocide".

The Qing "final solution" of genocide to solve the problem of the Dzungars made the Qing sponsored settlement of millions of Han Chinese, Hui, Turkestani Oasis people (Uyghurs) and Manchu Bannermen in Dzungaria possible, since the land was now devoid of Dzungars. Dzungaria, which used to be inhabited by Dzungars is currently inhabited by Kazakhs. In northern Xinjiang, the Qing brought in Han, Hui, Uyghur, Xibe, and Kazakh colonists after they exterminated the Dzungar Oirat Mongols in the region, with one third of Xinjiang's total population consisting of Hui and Han in the northern area, while around two thirds were Uyghurs in southern Xinjiang's Tarim Basin. In Dzungaria, the Qing established new cities like Ürümqi (former Dihua of Qing, 迪化) and Yining. The Qing were the ones who unified Xinjiang and changed its demographic situation.

The depopulation of northern Xinjiang after the Vajrayana Buddhist Oirats were slaughtered, led to the Qing settling Manchu, Sibo (Xibe), Daurs, Solons, Han Chinese, Hui Muslims, and Turkic Muslim Taranchis in the north, with Han Chinese and Hui migrants making up the greatest number of settlers. Since it was the crushing of the Buddhist Öölöd (Dzungars) by the Qing which led to promotion of Islam and the empowerment of the Muslim Begs in southern Xinjiang, and migration of Muslim Taranchis to northern Xinjiang, it was proposed by Henry Schwarz that "the Qing victory was, in a certain sense, a victory for Islam". Xinjiang as a unified defined geographic identity was created and developed by the Qing. It was the Qing who led to Turkic Muslim power in the region increasing since the Mongol power was crushed by the Qing while Turkic Muslim culture and identity was tolerated or even promoted by the Qing.

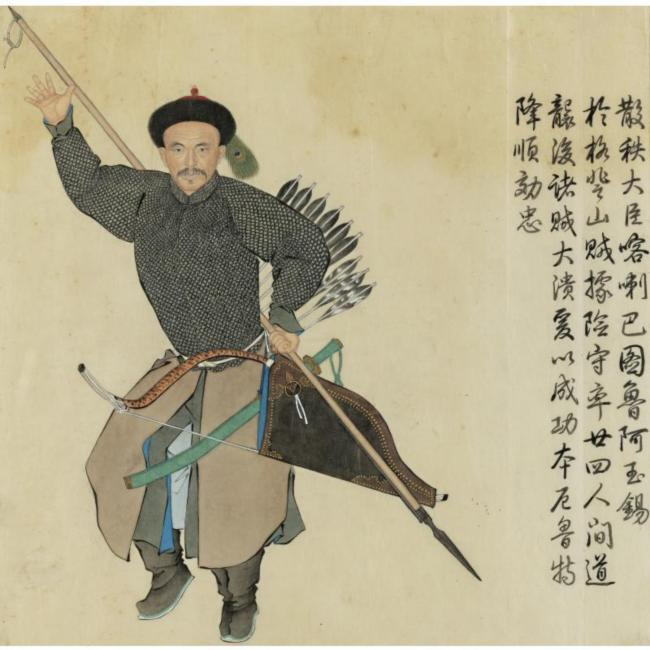
Ayusi, a Dzungar officer under the Qing dynasty

Qianlong explicitly commemorated the Qing conquest of the Dzungars as having added new territory in Xinjiang to "China", defining China as a multi ethnic state, rejecting the idea that China only meant Han areas in "China proper", meaning that according to the Qing, both Han and non-Han peoples were part of "China", which included Xinjiang which the Qing conquered from the Dzungars. After the Qing were done conquering Dzungaria in 1759, they proclaimed that the new land which formerly belonged to the Dzungars, was now absorbed into "China" (Dulimbai Gurun) in a Manchu language memorial.

The Qing expounded on their ideology that they were bringing together the "outer" non-Han Chinese like the Inner Mongols, Eastern Mongols, Oirat Mongols, and Tibetans together with the "inner" Han Chinese, into "one family" united in the Qing state, showing that the diverse subjects of the Qing were all part of one family, the Qing used the phrase "Zhong Wai Yi Jia" 中外一家 or "Nei Wai Yi Jia" 內外一家 ("interior and exterior as one family"), to convey this idea of "unification" of the different peoples. In the Manchu official Tulišen's Manchu language account of his meeting with the Torghut leader Ayuka Khan, it was mentioned that while the Torghuts were unlike the Russians, the "people of the Central Kingdom" (dulimba-i gurun 中國, Zhongguo) were like the Torghut Mongols, and the "people of the Central Kingdom" referred to the Manchus.

The Hulun Buir Oolods formed an administrative banner along the Imin and Shinekhen Rivers. During the Qing dynasty, a body of them resettled in Yakeshi city. In 1764 many Oolods migrated to Khovd Province in Mongolia and supplied corvee services for the Khovd garrison of the Qing. Their number reached 9,100 in 1989. A united administrative unit was demanded by them.

The Dzungars remaining in Xinjiang were also renamed Oolods. They dominated 30 of the 148 Mongol sums during the Qing dynasty era. They numbered 25,000 in 1999.

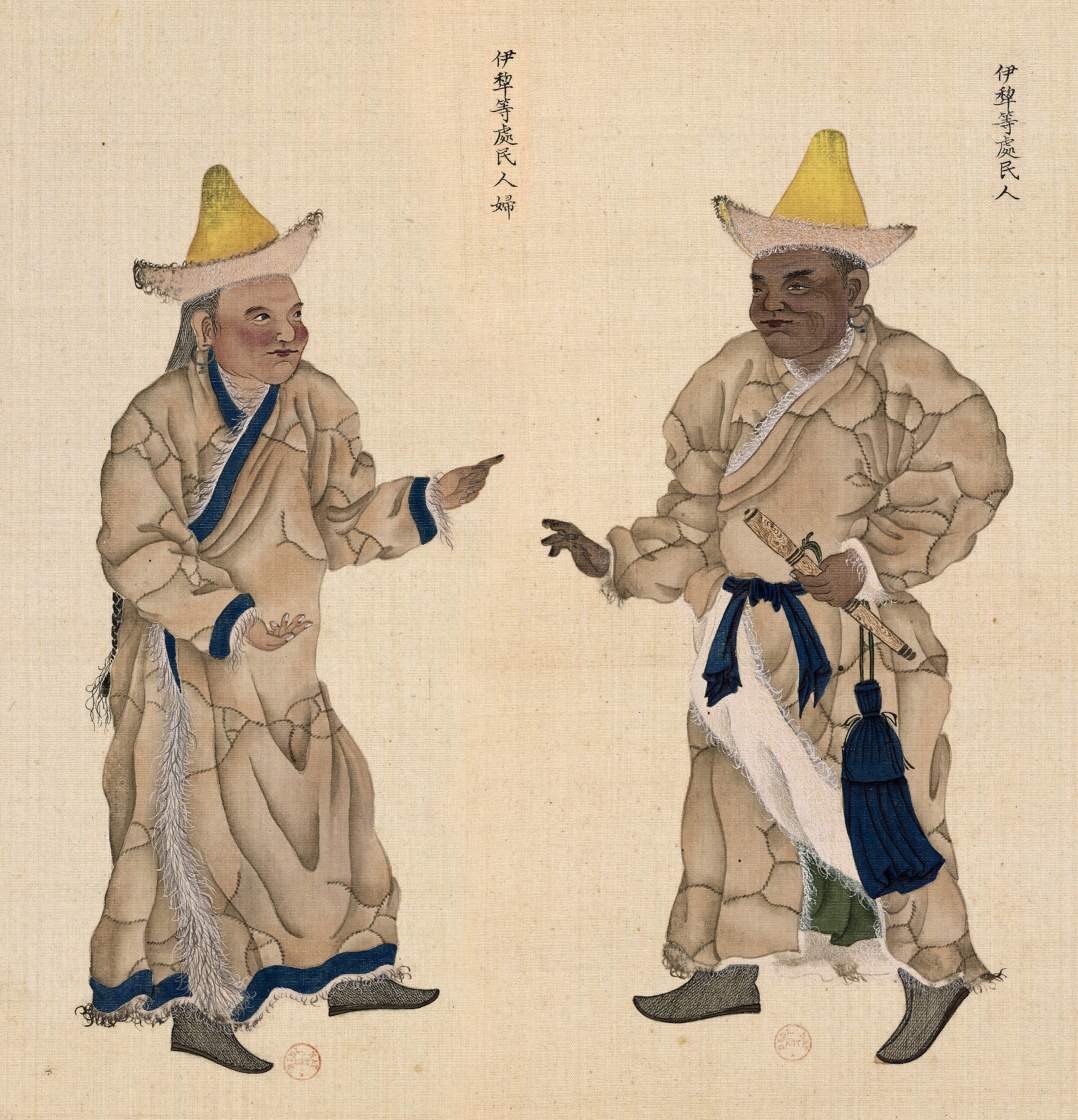
A commoner from Ili and other regions, with his wife. Huang Qing Zhigong Tu, 1769

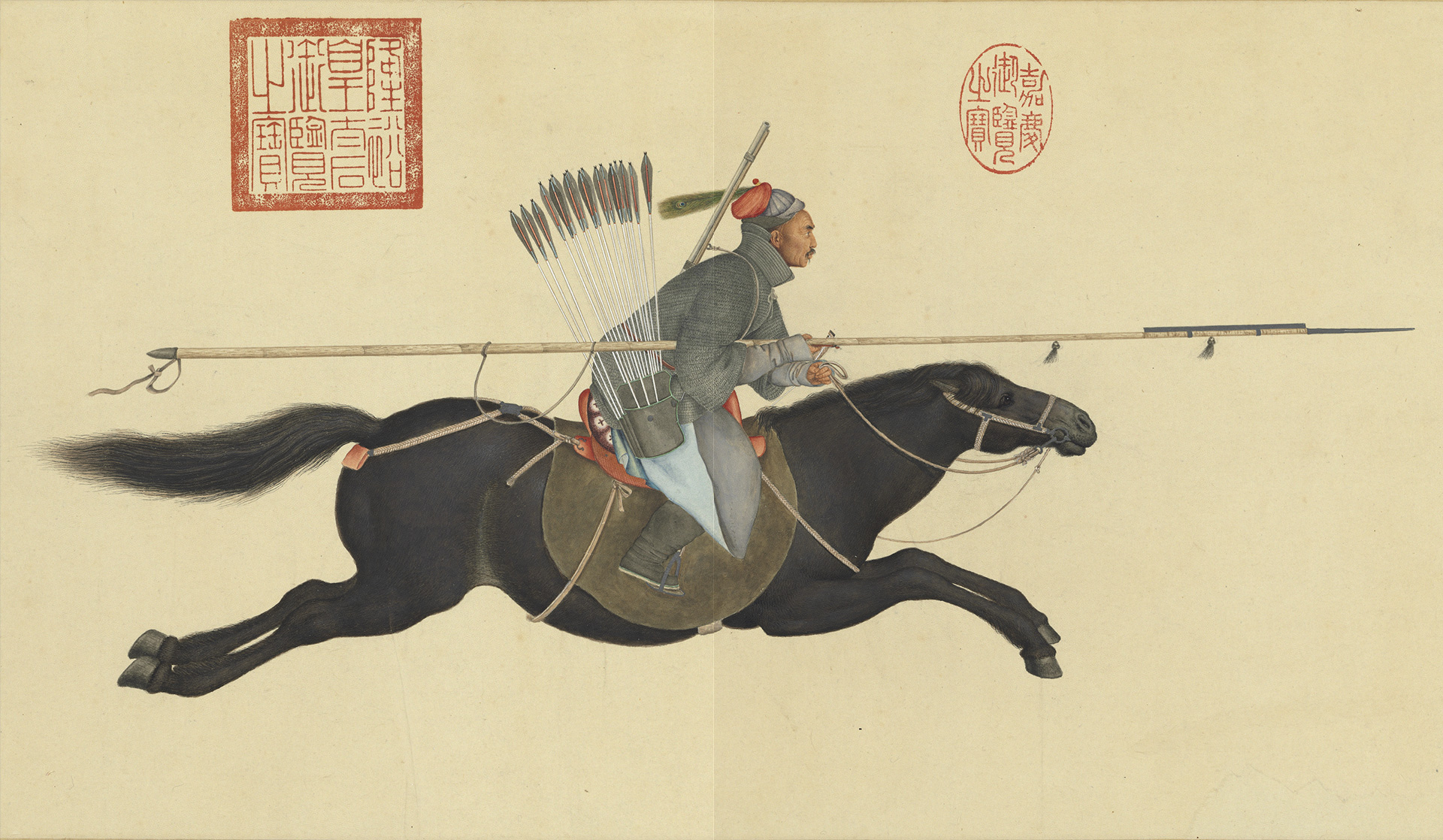
Ayusi riding a horse

== Sources ==
- Chuluunbaatar, Otgonbayar (2010). "The Cultural and Ethnic Identity of the Oirat Peoples" (PDF). In Lehner, E. (ed.). Along the Great Wall: Architecture and Identity in China and Mongolia. Vienna: IVA-ICRA. pp. 165–172. ISBN 978-3-900265-21-2.
- Clarke, Michael Edmund (2004). In the Eye of Power: China and Xinjiang from the Qing Conquest to the 'New Great Game' for Central Asia, 1759–2004 (PDF) (Thesis). Griffith University, Brisbane: Dept. of International Business & Asian Studies. Archived from the original (PDF) on 2008-04-10.
- Dunnell, Ruth W.; Elliott, Mark C.; Foret, Philippe; Millward, James A. (2004). New Qing Imperial History: The Making of Inner Asian Empire at Qing Chengde. Routledge. ISBN 978-1134362226.
- Elliott, Mark C. (2001). The Manchu Way: The Eight Banners and Ethnic Identity in Late Imperial China (illustrated, reprint ed.). Stanford University Press. ISBN 978-0804746847.
- Haines, R Spencer (2015). "Myth, Misconception, and Motive for the Zunghar Intervention in Khalkha Mongolia in the 17th Century". Paper Presented at the Third Open Conference on Mongolian Studies, Canberra, ACT, Australia. The Australian National University.
- Haines, R Spencer (2016). "The Physical Remains of the Zunghar Legacy in Central Eurasia: Some Notes from the Field". Paper Presented at the Social and Environmental Changes on the Mongolian Plateau Workshop, Canberra, ACT, Australia. The Australian National University.
- Haines, Spencer (2017). "The 'Military Revolution' Arrives on the Central Eurasian Steppe: The Unique Case of the Zunghar (1676 - 1745)". Mongolica: An International Journal of Mongolian Studies. 51. International Association of Mongolists: 170–185.
- Kim, Kwangmin (2008). Saintly Brokers: Uyghur Muslims, Trade, and the Making of Qing Central Asia, 1696--1814. University of California, Berkeley. ISBN 978-1109101263. Archived from the original on 4 December 2016.
- Liu, Tao Tao; Faure, David (1996). Unity and Diversity: Local Cultures and Identities in China. Hong Kong University Press. ISBN 978-9622094024.
- Levene, Mark (2008). "Empires, Native Peoples, and Genocides". In Moses, A. Dirk (ed.). Empire, Colony, Genocide: Conquest, Occupation, and Subaltern Resistance in World History. Oxford and New York: Berghahn. pp. 183–204. ISBN 978-1-84545-452-4.
- Millward, James (1 June 1998). Beyond the Pass: Economy, Ethnicity, and Empire in Qing Central Asia, 1759-1864. Stanford University Press. ISBN 9780804729338.
- Millward, James A. (2007). Eurasian Crossroads: A History of Xinjiang (illustrated ed.). Columbia University Press. ISBN 978-0231139243.
- Perdue, Peter C (2009). China Marches West: The Qing Conquest of Central Eurasia (reprint ed.). Harvard University Press. ISBN 978-0674042025.
- Perdue, Peter C (2005). China Marches West: The Qing Conquest of Central Eurasia (illustrated ed.). Harvard University Press. ISBN 978-0674016842.
- Starr, S. Frederick, ed. (2004). Xinjiang: China's Muslim Borderland (illustrated ed.). M.E. Sharpe. ISBN 978-0765613189.
- Theobald, Ulrich (2013). War Finance and Logistics in Late Imperial China: A Study of the Second Jinchuan Campaign (1771–1776). BRILL. ISBN 978-9004255678.
- Tyler, Christian (2004). Wild West China: The Taming of Xinjiang (illustrated, reprint ed.). Rutgers University Press. ISBN 978-0813535333.
- Zhao, Gang (January 2006). "Reinventing China Imperial Qing Ideology and the Rise of Modern Chinese National Identity in the Early Twentieth Century" (PDF). Modern China. 32 (1): 3–30. doi:10.1177/0097700405282349. JSTOR 20062627. S2CID 144587815. Archived from the original on 2014-03-25.
