= Altan Khan =

Mongolian prince

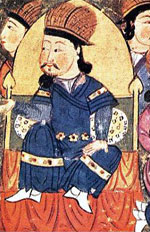

Shunyi prince (順義王)
- Reign: 21 April 1571 – 13 January 1582
- Predecessor: First
- Successor: Sengge Düüreng
- Born: 2 January 1508
- Died: 13 January 1582
- Spouse: Erketü Qatun
- House: Borjigin
- Father: Bars Bolud Jinong
- Religion: Tibetan Buddhism

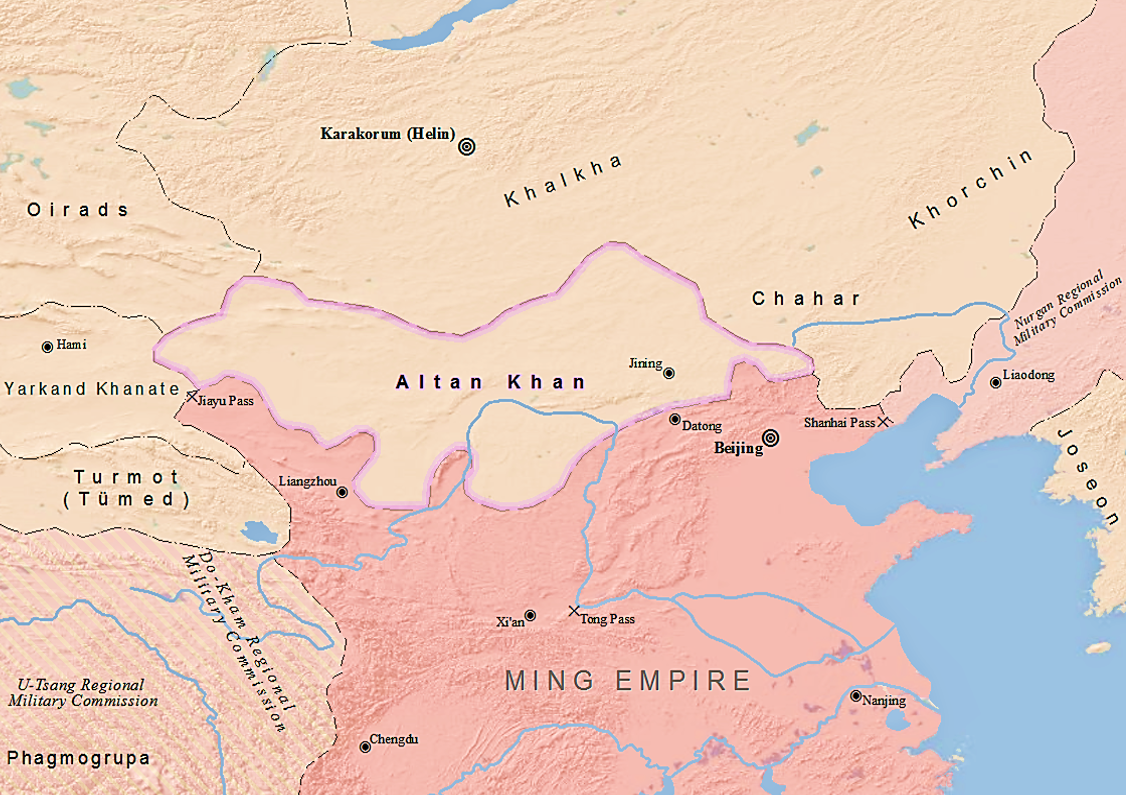
The region ruled by Altan Khan as of 1571 AD

Altan Khan (2 January 1508 – 13 January 1582; Mongolian: ᠠᠯᠲᠠᠨ ᠬᠠᠨ, Алтан хан; Chinese: 阿勒坦汗), also known as Anda (Chinese: 俺答; Mongolian: Аньда), was the leader of the Tümed Mongols and the de facto ruler of the Right Wing, or western tribes, of the Mongols. He was the grandson of Dayan Khan (1464–1543), a descendant of Kublai Khan (1215–1294). Altan Khan managed to unite a tribal league between the Khalkha Mongols in the north and the Chahars (Tsakhars) to the east. He later swore allegiance to the Ming dynasty of China as the Shunyi prince and became a patron of the Gelug Tibetan Buddhists.

== Consolidation of power ==
Borjigin Barsboladiin Altan was the second son of Bars Bolud Jinong and a grandson of Dayan Khan, who had re-unified the Mongolian nobility in an attempt to regain the glory of the Yuan dynasty. After Dayan Khan's time, the Mongol tribes constituted six myriads (tümen), which in turn were divided into a Left Wing and a Right Wing. The Left Wing was ruled by the Great Khan, descendants of grandson and successor Bodi Alagh. The Right Wing was ruled by Altan's father, Bars Bolud, who held the position of Jinong (vice-regent). Altan Khan ruled the Tümed subgroup of Mongols as his ulus (patrimonial territory); the Tümed's pastures were north of the border with Shanxi, in present-day Inner Mongolia. Altan's elder brother, Gün Bilig, inherited the position of Jinong and ruled the Ordos Mongols. After Gün Bilig's death in 1542, Altan became the de facto leader of the whole of the Right Wing and was given the title, "Tösheetü Sechen Khan".

When Bodi Alagh Khan, the Khagan of the Mongols from the Chahar, died in 1547, Altan forced Bodi Alagh's successor Darayisung Küdeng Khan to flee eastward. In 1551 Darayisung made a compromise with Altan in exchange for giving the title "Gegeen Khan" to him. Altan Khan, who controlled the Ordos tumen of the Yellow River was well placed to keep pressure on the Chinese and the Oirat Mongols in Tibet while developing both agriculture and trade.

Altan Khan also founded the city of Köke Khota (Hohhot, meaning "The Blue City"), now the capital of the Inner Mongolia Autonomous Region of the People's Republic of China.

== Relations with the Ming dynasty ==
Altan Khan wanted to trade horses with the Ming dynasty in exchange for agricultural products and Chinese textiles. Due to the Ming court's suspicion of him and opposition from scholar-officials, his attempts were repeatedly rebuffed, and his envoys were sometimes even killed. Local border officials and garrisons however were more open to trading with the Mongols and often did so clandestinely despite the prohibition. In 1529, 1530 and 1542, Altan Khan raided northern China partly in retaliation and partly for livestock and agricultural produce, but the plunders lacked the finer goods that he really desired. In 1550 he crossed gaps in the Great Wall and besieged Beijing, setting its suburbs on fire. To support his military campaigns, Altan Khan economically strengthened his Tümed base by welcoming Chinese refugees to settle there and nurtured a network of Ming conspirators led by a White Lotus disciple named Zhao Quan (赵全).

In 1552 Altan Khan gained control of the remains of Karakorum, the old Mongol capital. In 1570 Altan Khan's grandson Daičing Ejei Taiji defected to the Ming due to a family strife. Ministers of the Longqing Emperor proposed that Altan Khan should accept Ming title and turn over Zhao in exchange for Daičing Ejei and trading rights with the Ming. After verifying that his grandson was appointed by the Ming as a commander, Altan Khan agreed to the proposal. Zhao and his co-conspirators were subsequently executed by the Ming. Longqing Emperor conferred the title of Shunyi prince (順義王, 'obedient and righteous prince') to Altan Khan and renamed his capital to Guihua (歸化, 'returning to civilization', present-day Hohhot). Despite his submission to the Ming, Altan Khan retained significant autonomy. American Orientalist Owen Lattimore writes that while the Mongols were nominally vassals and paying the tribute, the Ming was also eager to please them and the arrangement was more or less mutually beneficial.

== Alliance with the Gelug school ==
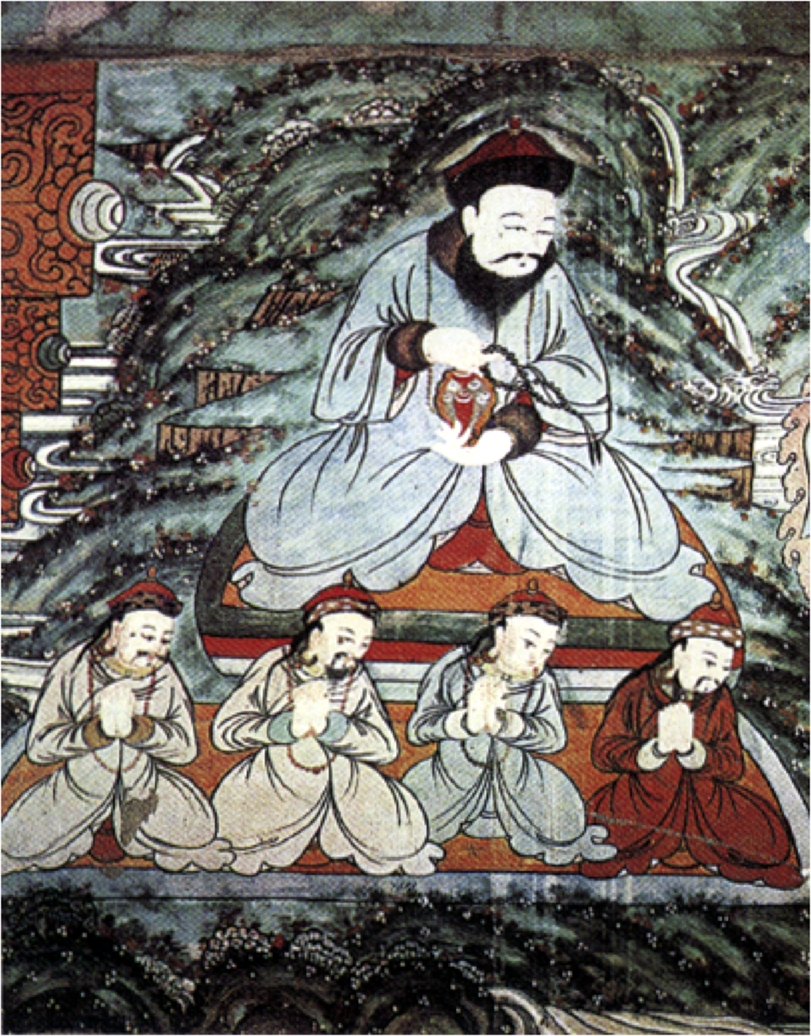
Altan Khan as icon of Buddhism.

Altan Khan is particularly remembered for establishing ties between Mongolia and the religious leaders of the Tibetan Gelug order. He became very interested in the Gelug, and Beijing was happy to provide him with Tibetan lamas (teachers), Tibetan scriptures, and translations. Altan Khan first invited Sonam Gyatso to Tümed in 1569, but apparently he refused to go and sent a disciple instead, who reported back to him about the great opportunity to spread Buddhist teachings throughout Mongolia.

Sonam Gyatso accepted Altan Khan's invitation to Tümed in 1577. Altan Khan later had Thegchen Chonkhor, Mongolia's first monastery, built at the place of the meeting. Also, the ruler of the Khalkha Mongols, Abtai Sain Khan, rushed to Tümed to meet the Dalai Lama. He built the Erdene Zuu Monastery in 1586, at the site of the former Mongol capital of Karakorum following his adoption of Buddhism as the state religion. This monastery is also often (wrongly) referred to as the first monastery in Mongolia and it grew into a massive establishment. In 1792, it contained 68 temples and some 15,000 lamas.

Sonam Gyatso publicly announced that he was a reincarnation of the Tibetan Sakya monk Drogön Chögyal Phagpa (1235–1280) who had converted Kublai Khan. He also claimed Altan Khan was a reincarnation of Kublai Khan (1215–1294), the famous ruler of the Mongol Empire and Emperor of China, and that they had come together again to cooperate in propagating the Buddhist religion. One of the primary reasons Altan Khan adopted Buddhism was the concern among Mongol elites that the peace established with China in 1571 would accelerate the spread of Chinese cultural influence among the Mongols and ultimately undermine their distinct Mongolian nomadic cultural identity.

Altan Khan designated Sonam Gyatso as "Dalai" (a translation into Mongolian of the name Gyatso, meaning "ocean") in 1578, and in October 1587, as requested by the family of Altan Khan, Gyalwa Sonam Gyatso was promoted to Duǒ Er Zhǐ Chàng (Chinese:朵儿只唱) by the emperor of China, seal of authority and golden sheets were granted. As a result, Sonam Gyatso became known as the Dalai Lama – frequently translated into English as "Ocean of Wisdom" – which since then has been used as a title. The title was also posthumously given to Gendun Drup and Gendun Gyatso, who were considered Sonam Gyatso's previous incarnations. Thus, Sonam Gyatso was recognized as being already the 3rd Dalai Lama.

Sonam Gyatso never returned to Tibet but remained proselytizing among the Mongols. The Tümed Mongols and their allies were brought into the Gelug tradition, which was to become the main spiritual orientation of the Mongols in the ensuing centuries.

Sonam Gyatso's message was that the time had come for Mongolia to embrace Buddhism, that from that time on there should be no more animal sacrifices, there must be no taking of life, animal or human, military action must be pursued only with purpose and the immolation of women on the funeral pyres of their husbands must be abolished. He also secured an edict abolishing the Mongol custom of blood-sacrifices. "These and many other such laws were set forth by Gyalwa Sonam Gyatso and were instituted by Altan Khan."

A massive program of translating Tibetan (and Sanskrit) texts into Mongolian was commenced, with letters written in silver and gold and paid for by the Dalai Lama's Mongolian devotees. Within 50 years virtually all Mongols had become Buddhist, with tens of thousands of monks, who were members of the Gelug order, loyal to the Dalai Lama.

When Sonam Gyatso died in 1588, his incarnation – and thus, the new Dalai Lama – was Altan Khan's great-grandson.

== Death and legacy ==
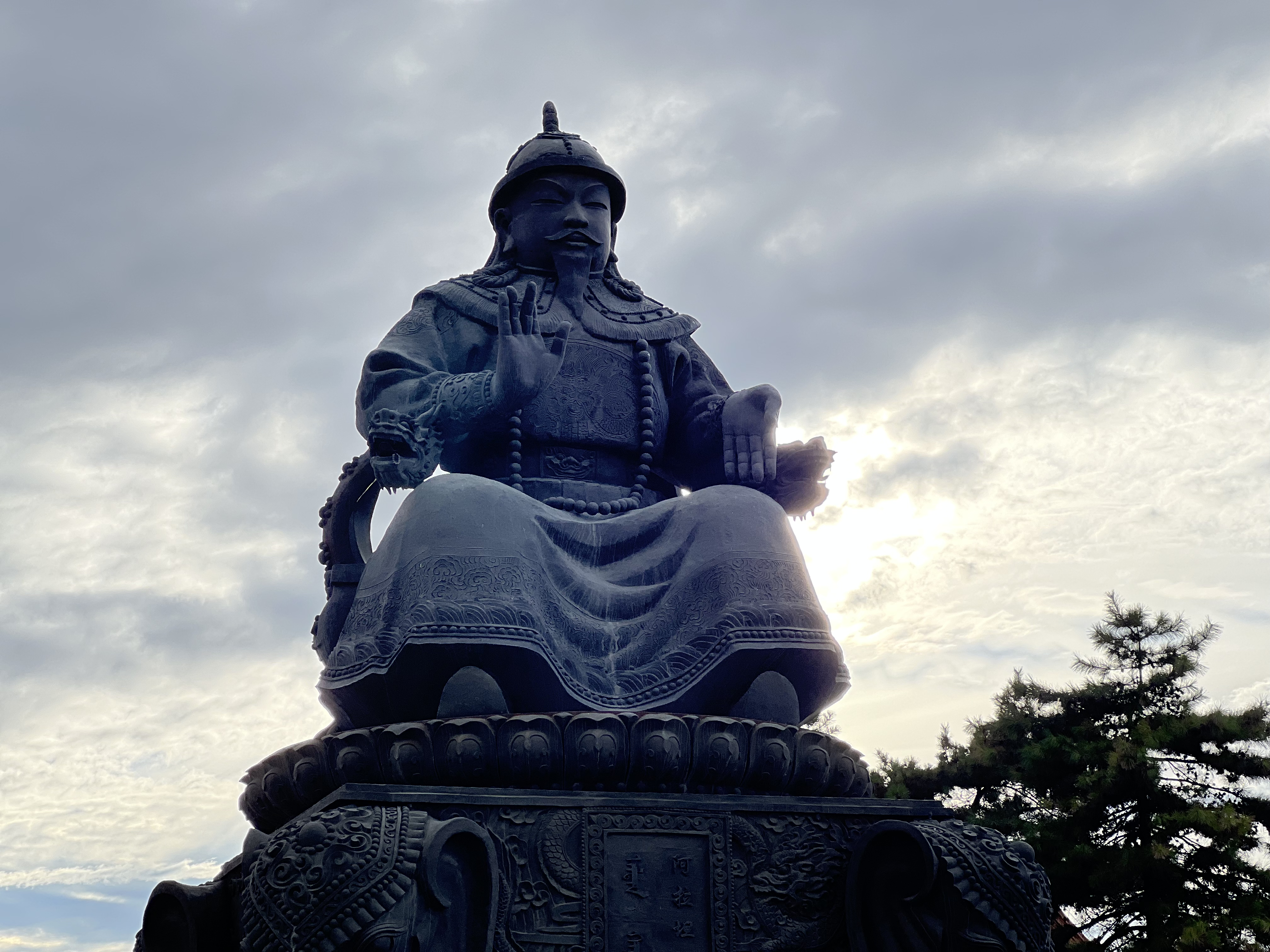
Statue of Altan Khan, Dazhao Temple, Hohhot

Altan Khan died of old age on 13 January 1582 at the age of 74 or 75. His title of Shunyi prince was succeeded by his son Sengge Düüreng with support from the Ming. Altan Khan's great-grandson, Yonten Gyatso, was selected as the 4th Dalai Lama in 1601. In order to commemorate Altan Khan's contribution to Hohhot, a seated statue of him was completed in 2011 using money donated by businesses. It sits in the square in front of the Dazhao Temple that he had ordered to build in 1579.

== See also ==
- Altan Khan of the Khalkha

== Sources ==
- McKay, Alex, ed. (2003). The History of Tibet. Vol. 2. London: RoutledgeCurzon. ISBN 978-0-7007-1508-4.
