= Huang Qing Zhigong Tu =

Huang Qing Zhigong Tu (Chinese: 皇清職貢圖; Collection of Portraits of Subordinate Peoples of the Qing Dynasty) is an 18th-century ethnological study of Chinese tributary states, including Western nations that traded with the Qing Empire. It was published around 1769. The book identified peoples and countries by drawing attention to their national dresses, similarly to European costume books.

The study contained numerous factual errors, such as reporting that France had been a Buddhist state before becoming Catholic, that England and Sweden were vassals of Holland, and that France (Falanxi) and Portugal (Folangji) were the same country.

== Gallery ==
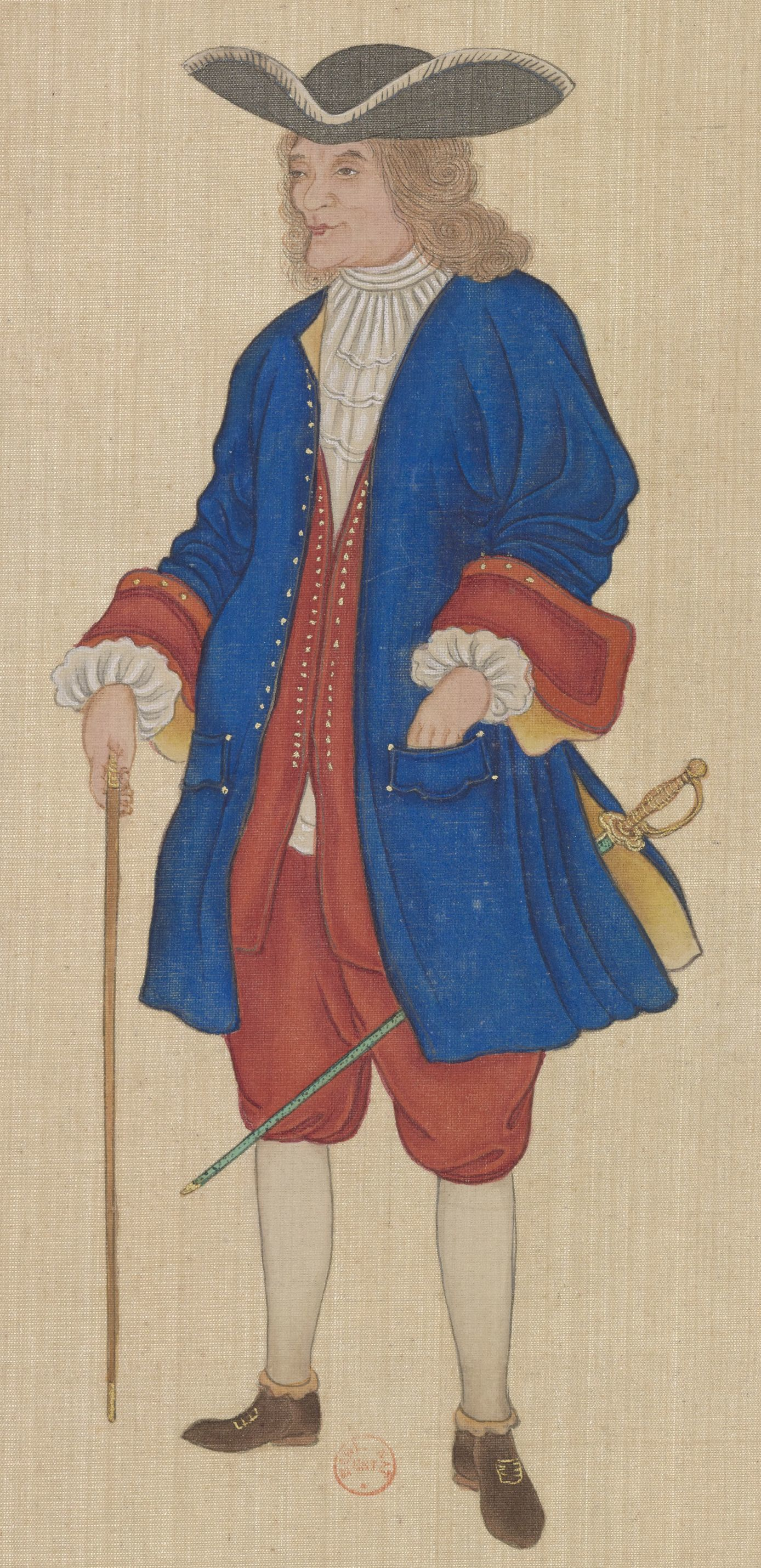
Man of the Great Western Ocean (Italy or Portugal)

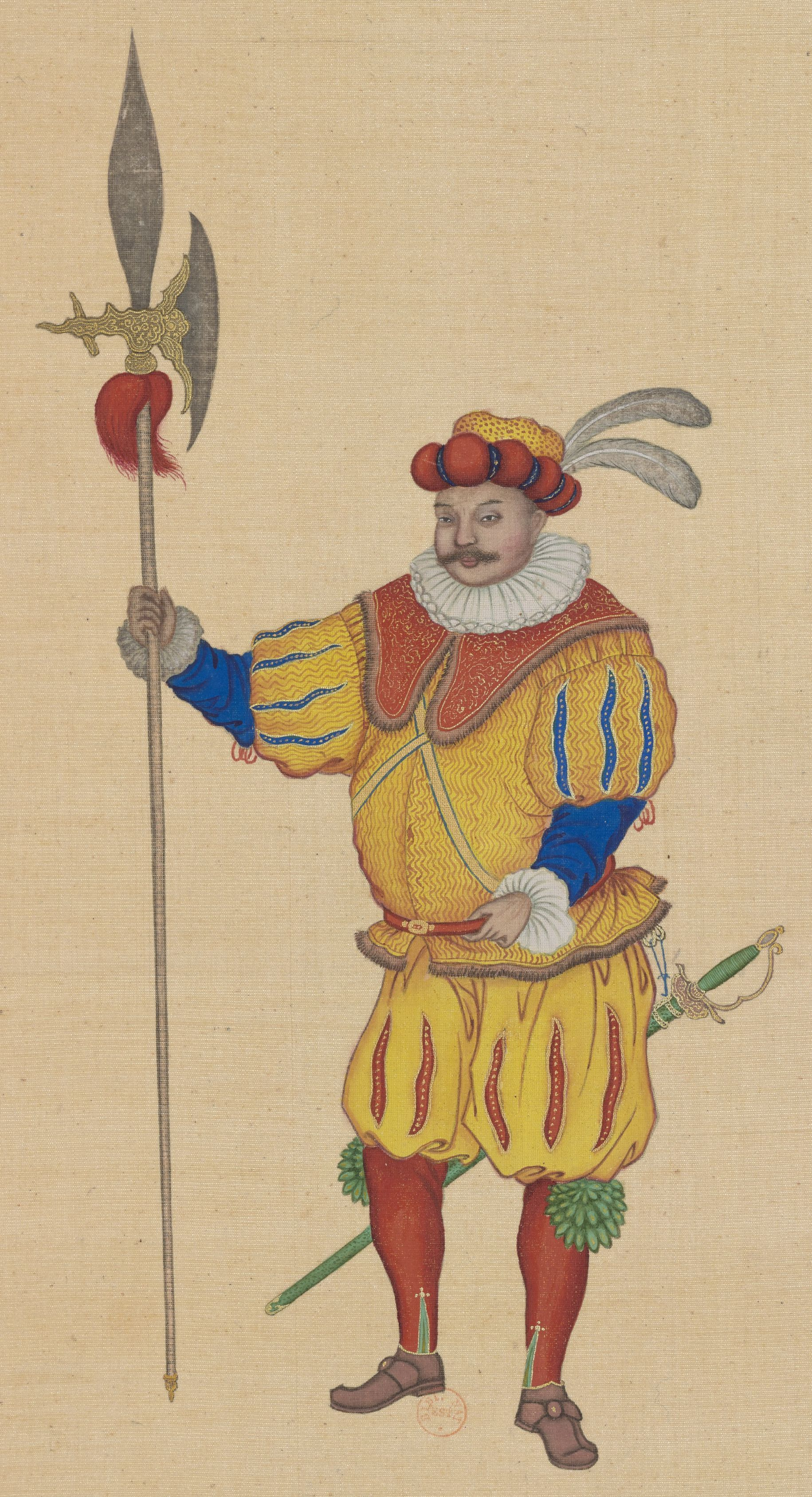
Man of the province of Helvetia (Heleiweijiya sheng), of the Great Western Ocean (Europe)

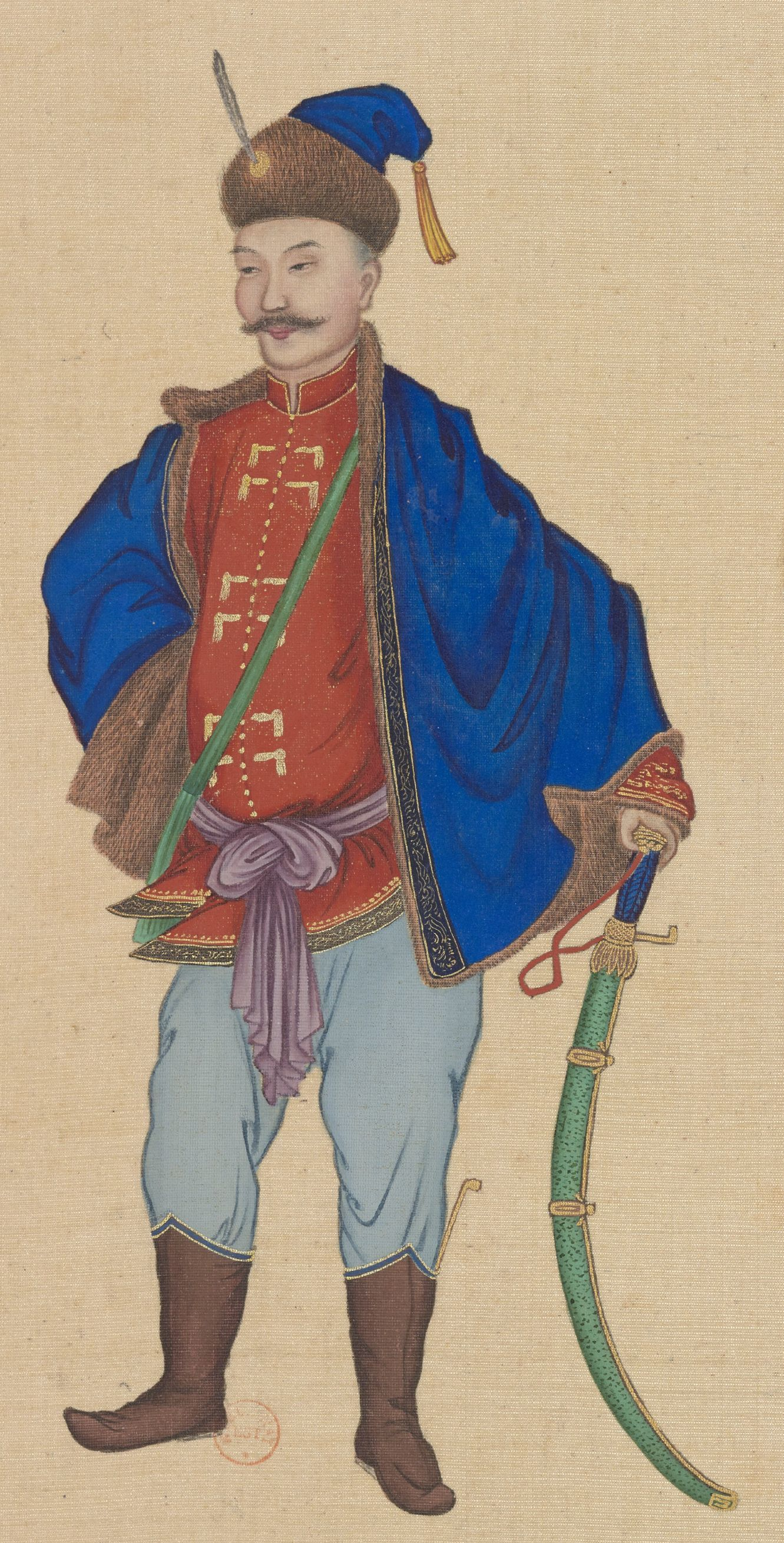
Man of Hungary (Wengjialiya) in the Great Western Ocean

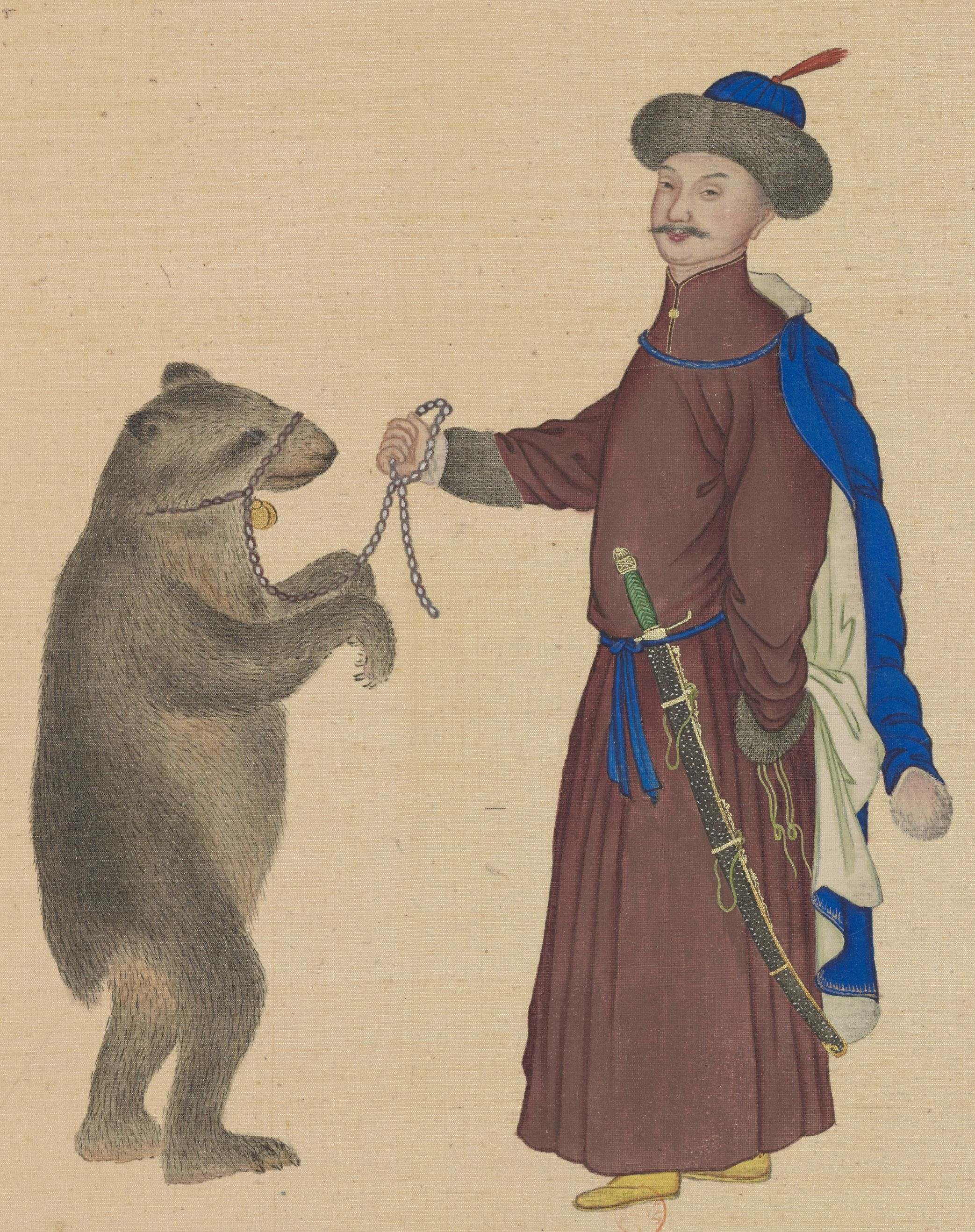
Man of Poland (Boluniya) in the Great Western Ocean

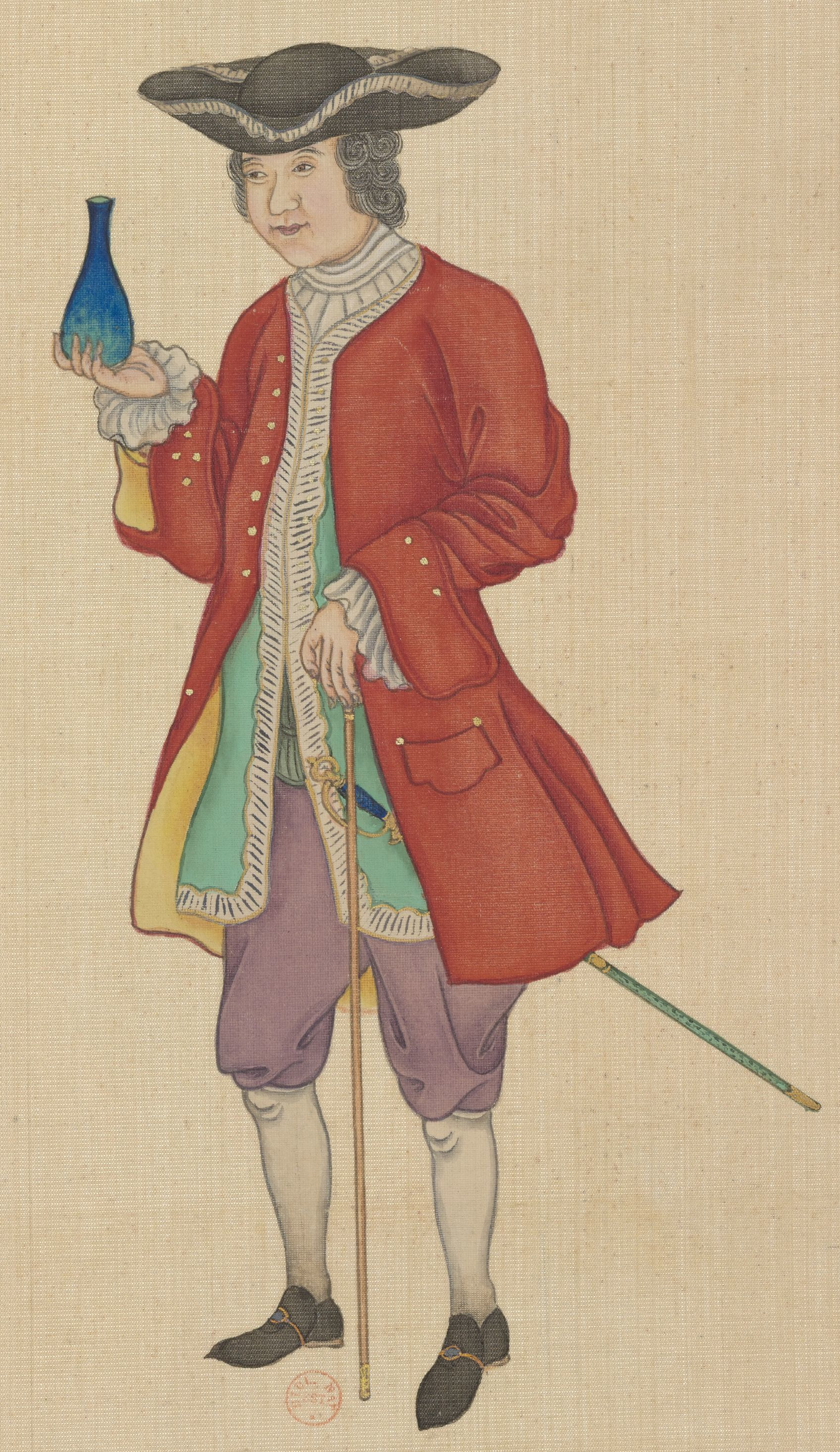
Man of England (Yingjili)

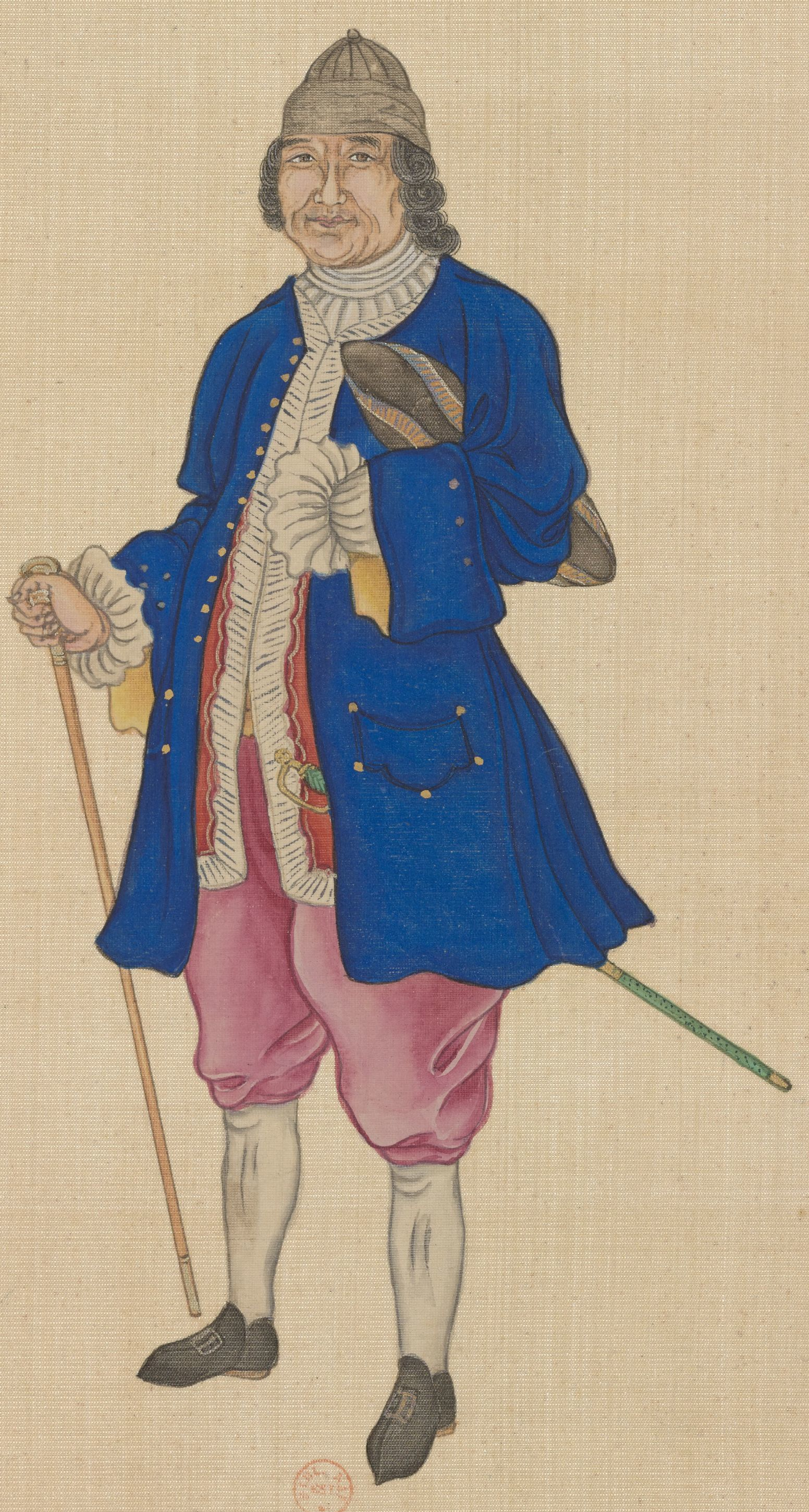
Man of France (Falanxi)

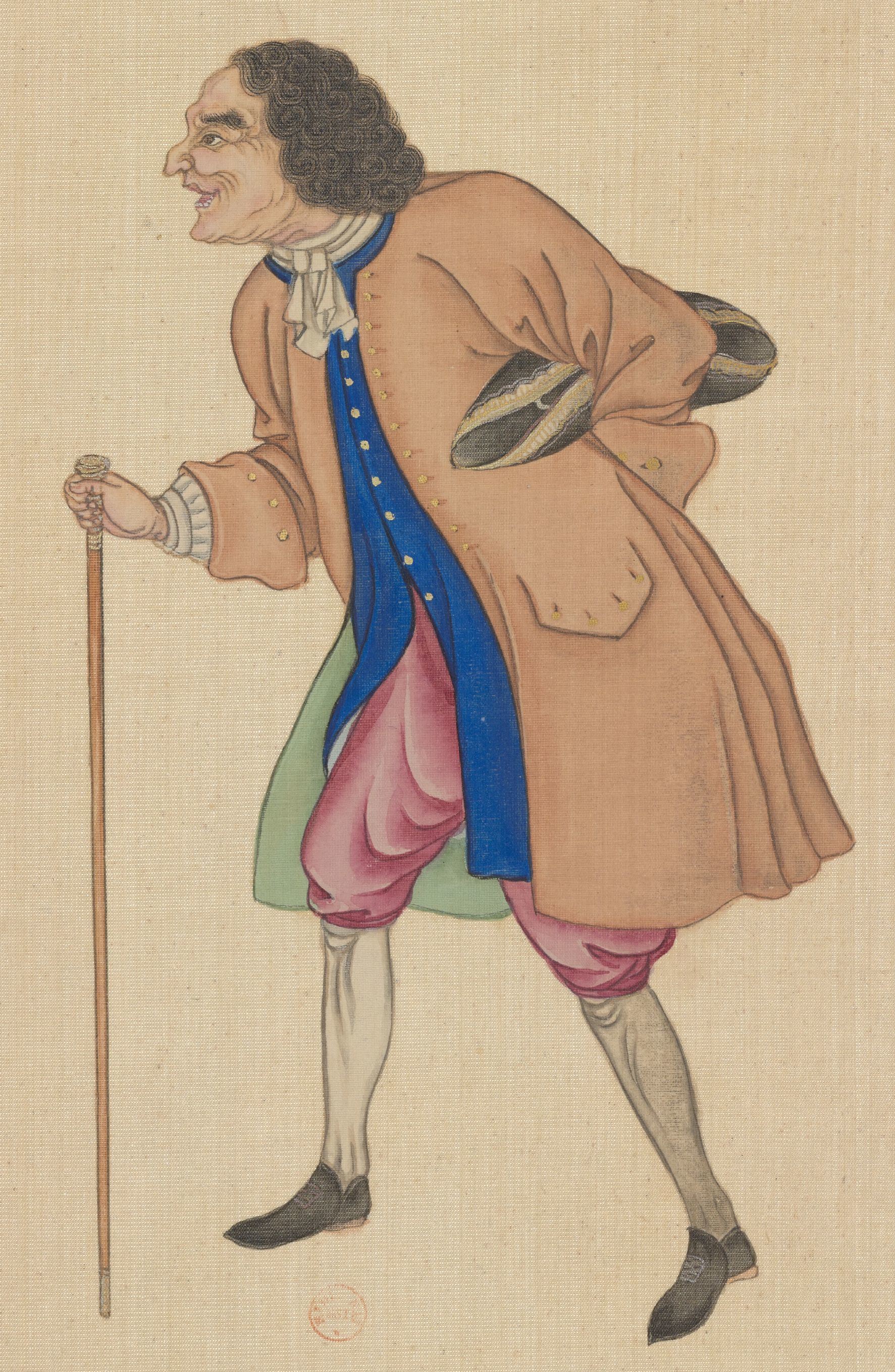
Man of Sweden (Rui)

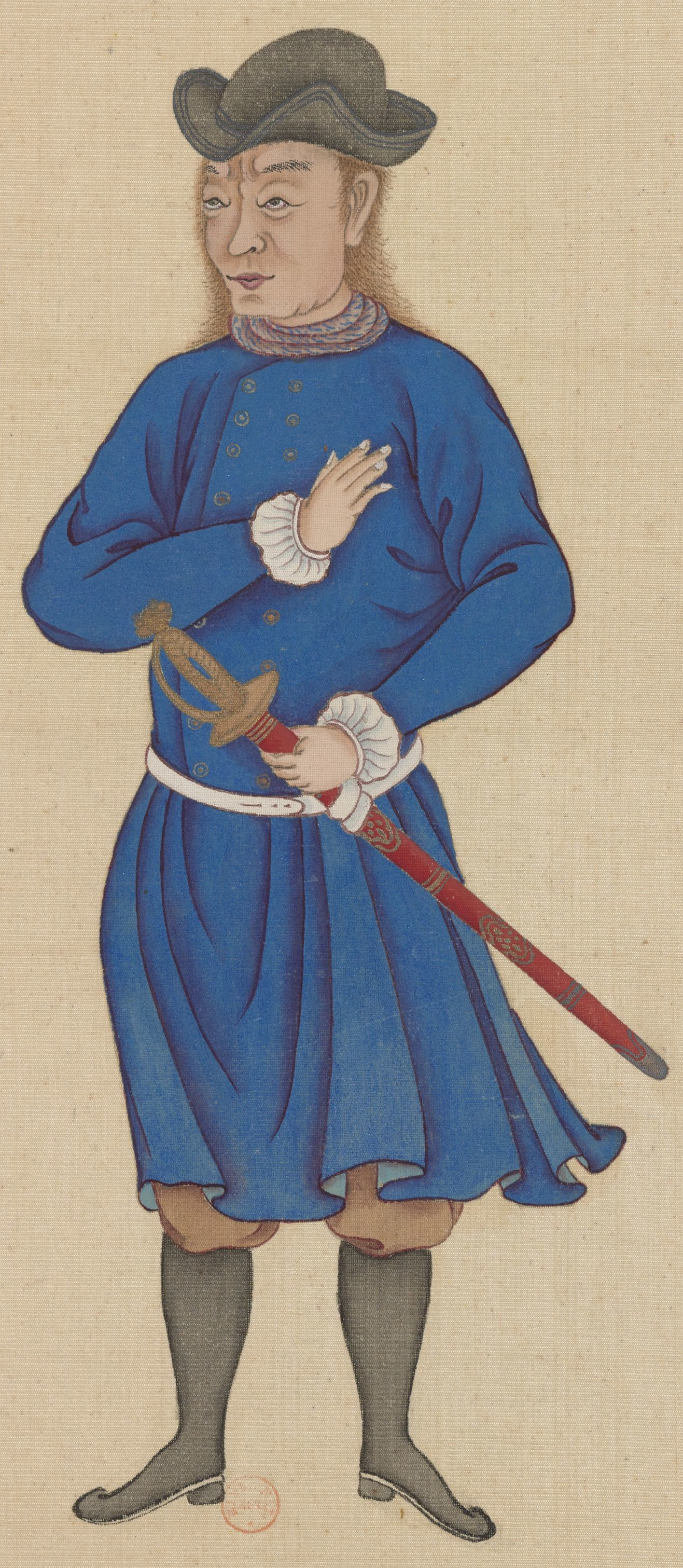
Official of Russia (Eluosi)

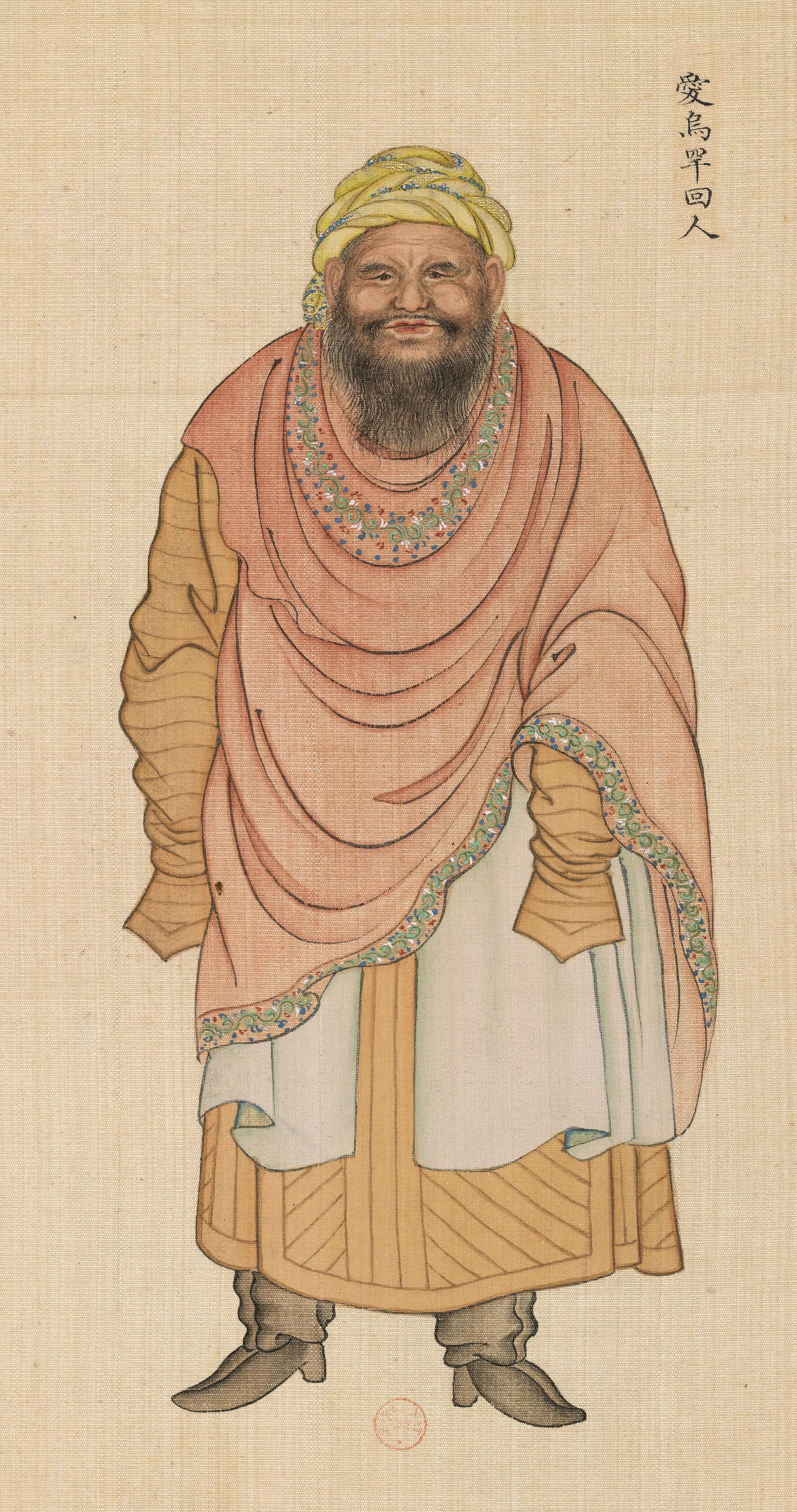
Muslim man from Afghanistan (愛烏罕回人). Huang Qing Zhigong Tu, 1769

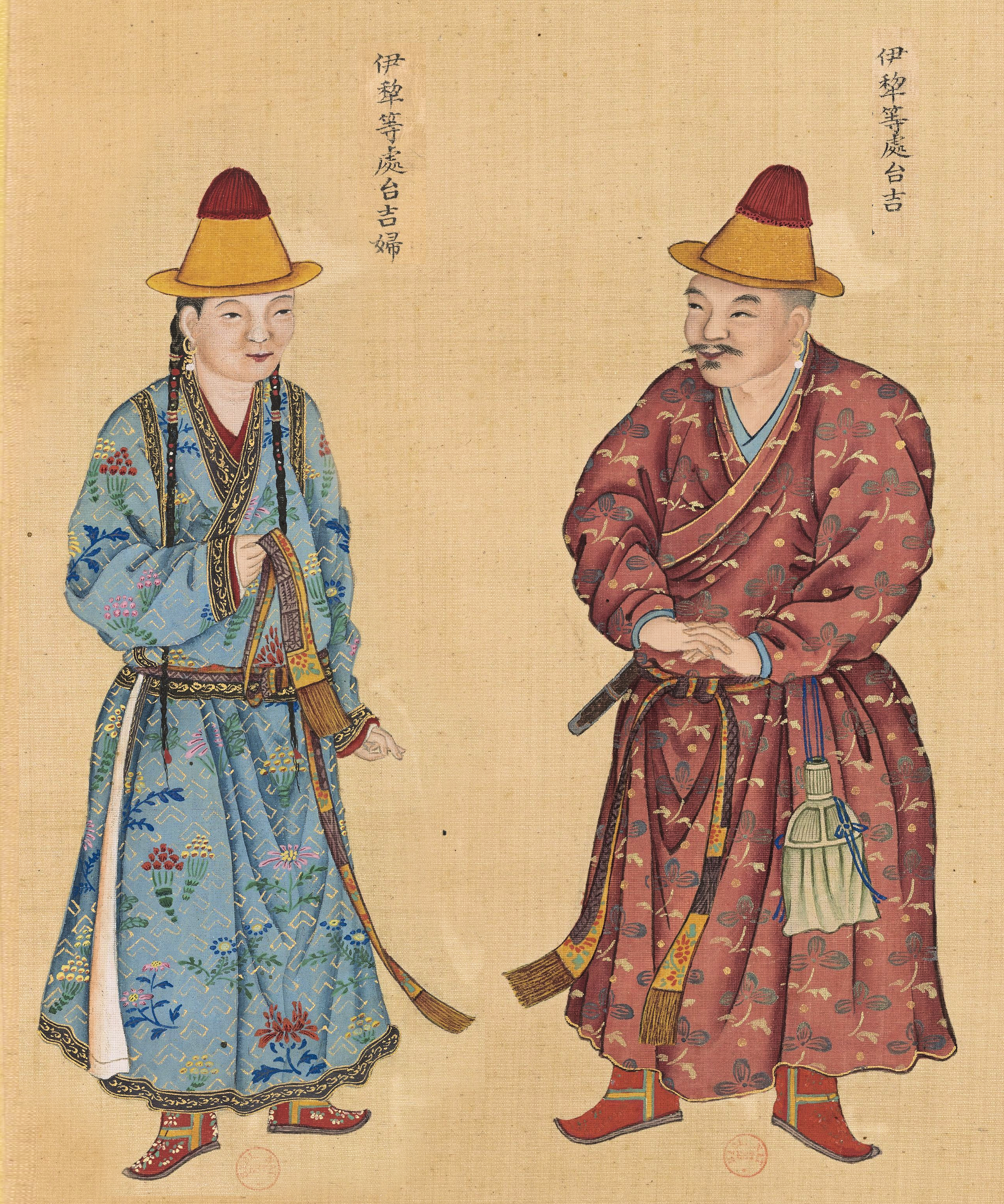
Mongol Dzungar Prince (Taiji) from Ili and other regions, and his wife. Huang Qing Zhigong Tu, 1769.

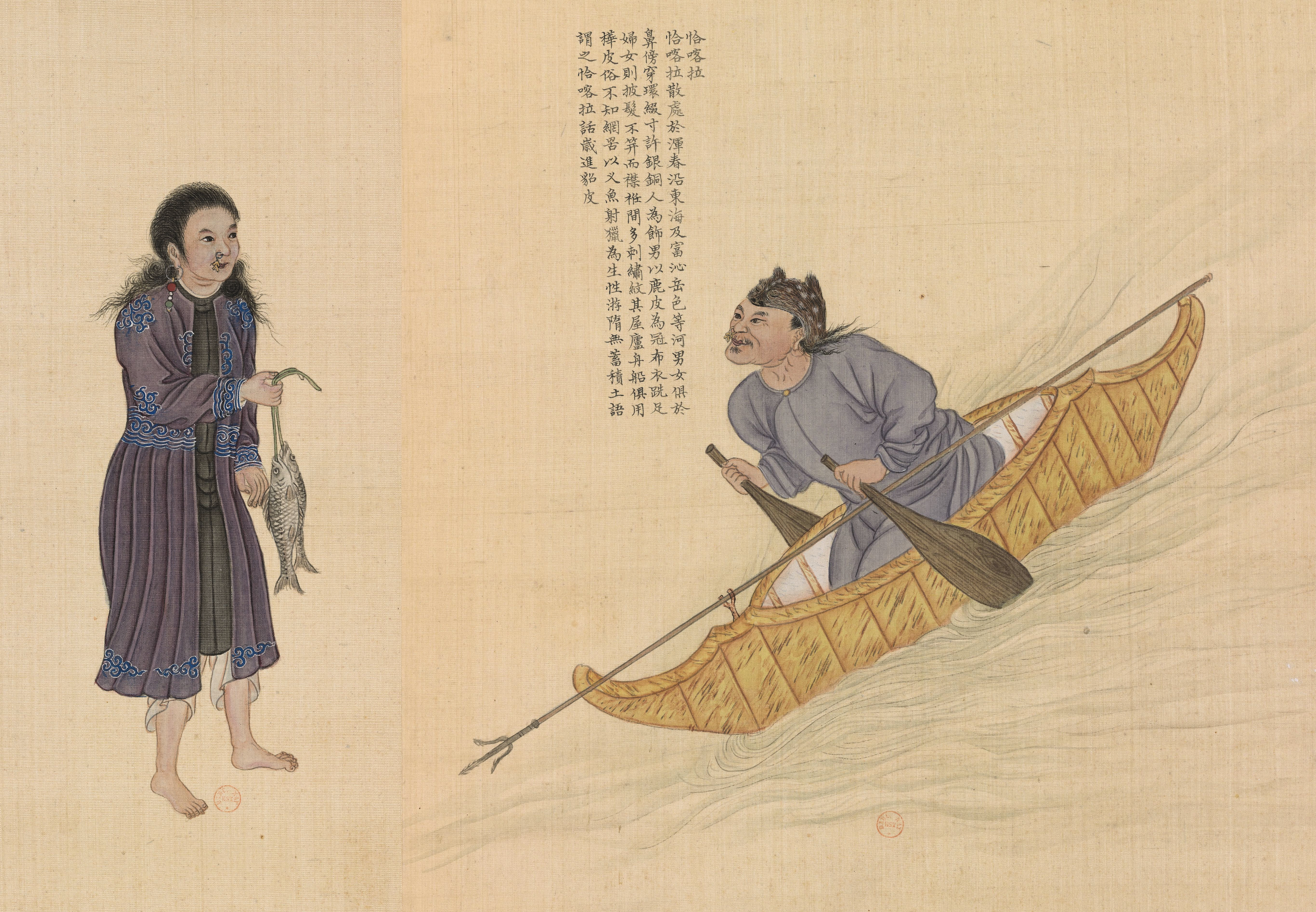
"Qiakala" people (恰喀拉), Qing designation of the Udege people. Huang Qing Zhigong Tu, 1769

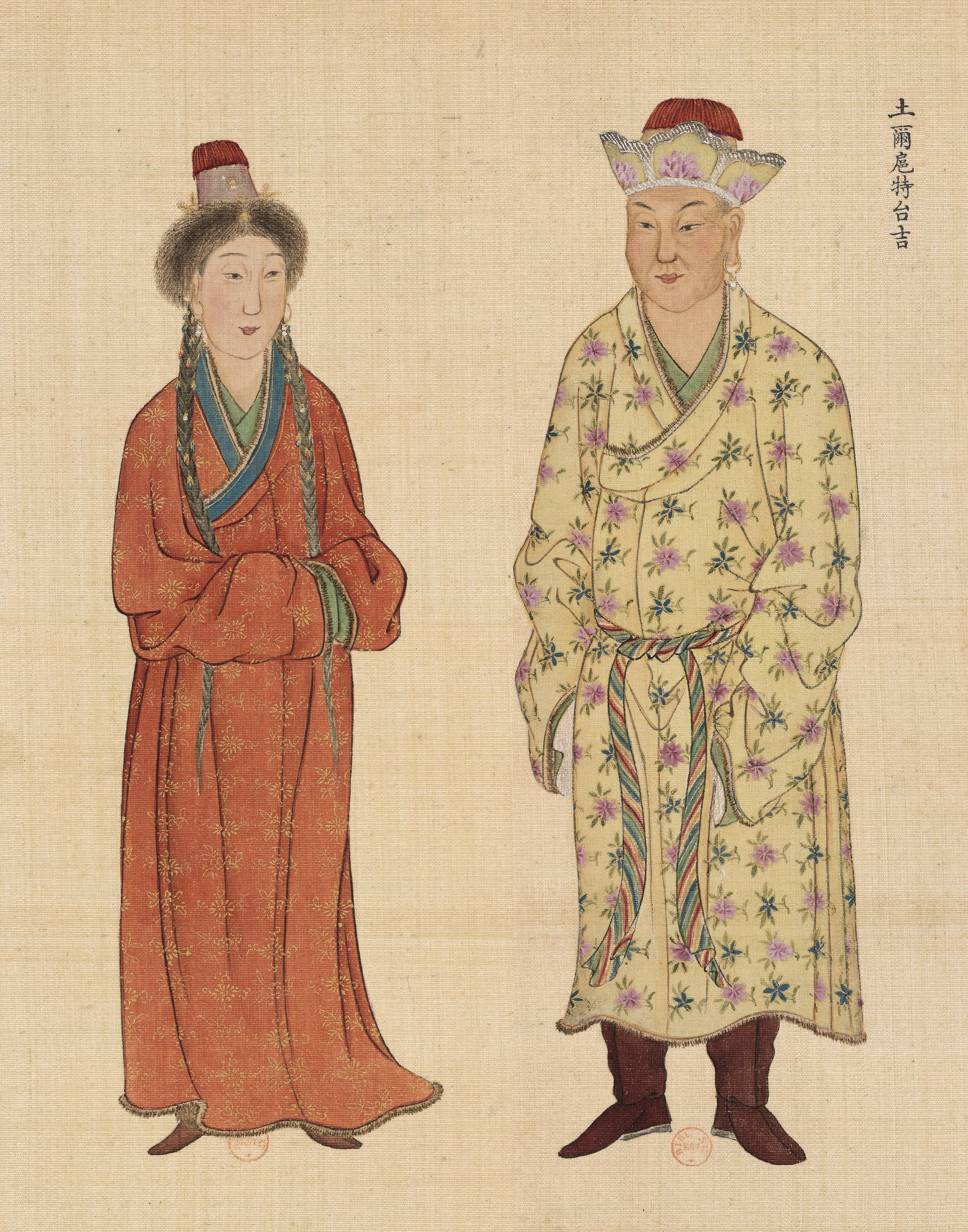
Tayiji (prince) of the Torghuts and his wife (土爾扈特台吉). Huang Qing Zhigong Tu, 1769.

== See also ==
- Chinese geography
- Portraits of Periodical Offering
