= Daraisung Guden Khan =

Guden Khan Дарайсун Гүдэн хаан ᠬᠦᠳᠡᠨ ᠬᠠᠭᠠᠨ
- Khagan of the Mongols

Khagan of the Northern Yuan dynasty
- Reign: 1547–1557
- Predecessor: Bodi Alagh Khan
- Successor: Tümen Zasagt Khan
- Born: c. 1520
- Died: 1557 (aged 36–37)
- House: Borjigin
- Dynasty: Northern Yuan
- Father: Bodi Alagh Khan

Guden Khan (Mongolian: Гүдэн Хаан; Chinese: 庫騰汗), who was born Daraisung (or Darayisung; Mongolian: Дарайсун; Chinese: 打來孫), (c. 1520–1557) was a khagan of the Northern Yuan dynasty, reigning from 1547 to 1557. He was the eldest son of Bodi Alagh Khan, whom he succeeded as khagan.

During his rule, Altan Khan, who led the Tümed Mongols at the time, became more powerful and also more disrespectful of the power of the Great Khan. Daraisung Khan was unable to achieve victory in the conflicts that arose from this. Altan Khan eventually forced Daraisung Guden Khan to flee eastward. Four years later in 1551, Daraisung made a compromise with Altan accepting Altan's leadership in exchange for giving the title "Gegeen Khan" to him. As a result, Daraisung Guden Khan was forced to relocate his imperial court to the east near Manchuria, and the power of the Great Khan began to decline. Although most Mongol nobles still recognized the Great Khan as the leader, it was in name only and two Borjigin nobles declared themselves as khans of their own territories during this period.

With the decline of a unified Mongol state, Daraisung Khan's great-grandson, Ligden Khan, the last Mongol Borjigin khan, eventually became known as Ligden of the Chahar, and was subjugated by the Later Jin dynasty in 1635.

== See also ==
- List of khans of the Northern Yuan dynasty

Daraisung Guden Khan House of Borjigin Died: 1547–1557
Regnal titles
Preceded by Bodi Alagh Khan	Khagan of the Northern Yuan dynasty 1547–1557	Succeeded by Tümen Jasagtu Khan
