= Bars Bolud Jinong =

Bars Bolud Барсболд хаан ᠪᠠᠷᠰ ᠪᠣᠯᠤᠳ
- Khagan of the Mongols, Jinong

Khagan of the Northern Yuan dynasty
- Reign: c.1517 – 1519
- Predecessor: Dayan Khan
- Successor: Bodi Alagh Khan
- Born: 1490
- Died: 1531 (aged 40–41)
- House: Borjigin
- Dynasty: Northern Yuan
- Father: Dayan Khan

Bars Bolud (Mongolian: Барс Болд; Chinese: 巴爾斯博羅特), (1490–1531) was a khagan of the Northern Yuan dynasty, reigning from 1517 to 1519. He later became jinong from 1519 to 1531. His name, Bars Bolud, means "Steel Tiger".

== Reign ==
Barsbolad Jinong was the third son of Dayan Khan, who appointed his grandson (the eldest son of Dayan Khan's second son), Bodi Alagh Khan, as his successor. After the death of Dayan Khan, Barsbolad (Basbolud) Jinong proclaimed himself as the great khan, claiming that Bodi Alagh Khan was too young and too inexperienced to maintain the large Mongol empire, and he was able to rally support from some of the Mongol populace who feared that after a century of fighting, the unification and prosperity finally achieved during Manduhai and Dayan Khan's rule were to be lost and a more experienced leader was needed. However, more than three years later, Bodi Alagh Khan allied with another uncle of his, the fourth son of Dayan Khan, and challenged the Barsbolad Jinong, and both sides reached a compromise to avoid bloodshed among fellow Mongols: Barsbolad Jinong would give up the crown and Bodi Alagh Khan would be the new Great Khan of Mongols, while his sons were also named as different khans. However, the loss of the crown of the Great Khan of Mongol was too much for Barsbolad Jinong and he soon died afterward. He was the father of Altan Khan, one of the great leaders of the Northern Yuan. Barsbold was very well known for his bravery and exceptional military skills in his father's campaigns against Oirats and other Mongol factions.

== See also ==
- List of khans of the Northern Yuan dynasty

Bars Bolud Jinong House of Borjigin Died: 1516-1519
Regnal titles
Preceded by Dayan Khan	Khagan of the Northern Yuan dynasty 1516–1519	Succeeded by Bodi Alagh Khan (Budi)
