= Costume book =

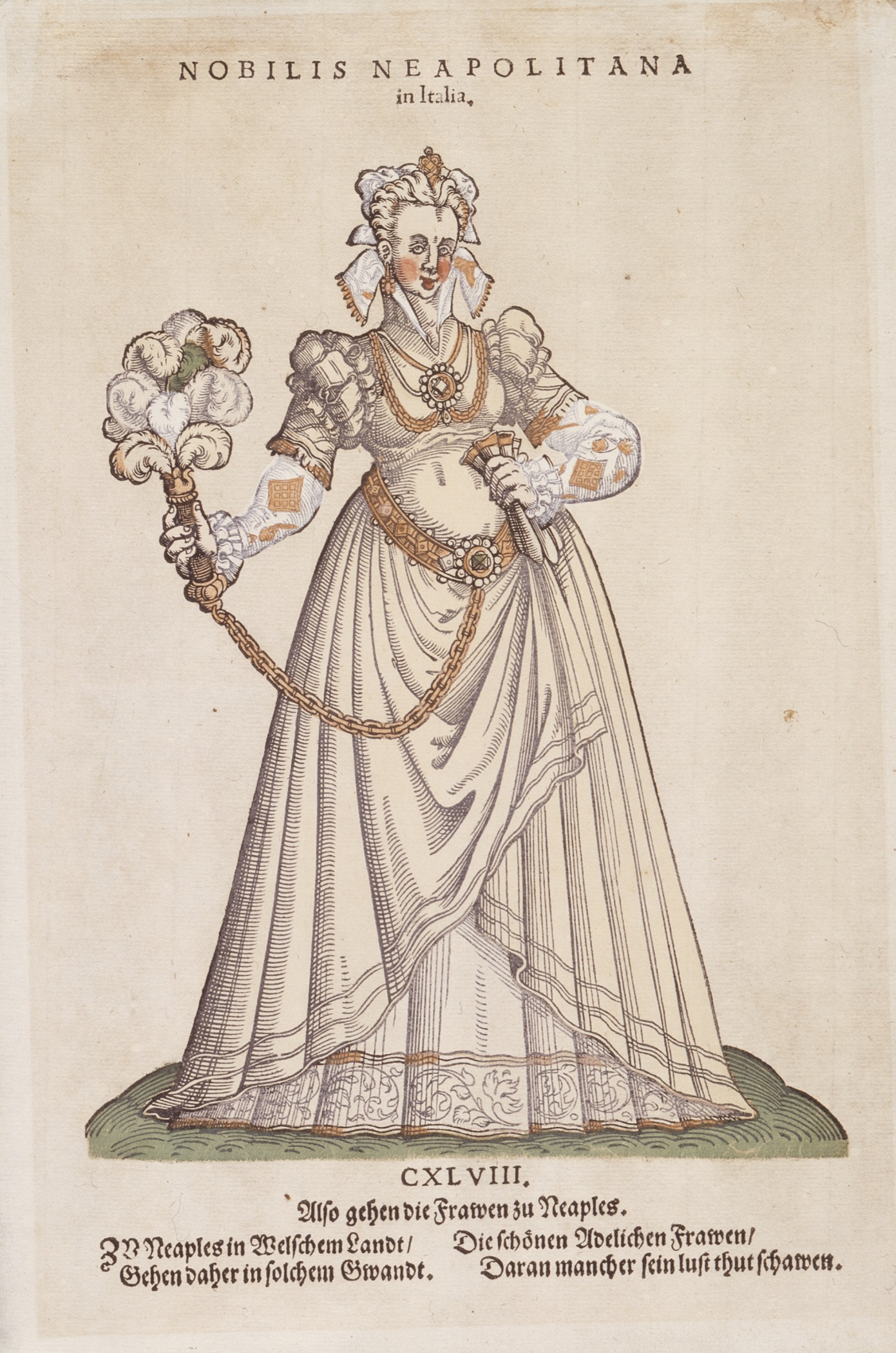
'Nobilis Neapolitana' from Trachtenbuch von Nürnberg

A costume book is a collection of images or figures of dress worn by different people of different ranks and places. It emerged as a pictorial genre in the sixteenth century in Europe. Earlier costume books include figures from around the world. They are sometimes accompanied by text describing the costume and customs. An example of a costume book by Cesare Vecellio is Degli habit antichi et modern di diverse parti del mondo, published in Venice by Damaro Zen in 1590 and subsequently revised and published by the Sessa brothers in 1598 under the title Habiti antichi et moderni di tutto il mondo.

Costume books are difficult to define as they may include hand painted and printed illustrations resembling travel accounts or encyclopedic collections. Early costume books are seen as ethnographic studies for understanding foreign cultures, especially before photography was invented.

A significant example of an early 19th century costume book is French painter Louis Dupré's Voyage à Athènes et à Constantinople (Paris: Dondey-Dupré, 1825). The book primarily depicts the inhabitants of Ottoman Greece. It emphasizes modernity and cultural diversity with a heavily philhellenic bias. However, it moves away from the stereotypes common in other costume studies in order to delineate the antiquity of the contemporary Greek scene.

Two major art historians working on costume books are Ann Rosalind Jones and Ulrike Ilg. Ilg discusses the manner in which costume books transposed the issue of morality upon clothing, noting how various albums dealt with concepts of modesty and luxury, particularly within the context of existing sumptuary laws and other regulations placed on dress.
