= Bodi Alagh Khan =

Alagh Khan Бодь Алаг хаан ᠠᠯ‍ᠠᠭ ᠬᠠᠭᠠᠨ
- Khagan of the Mongols
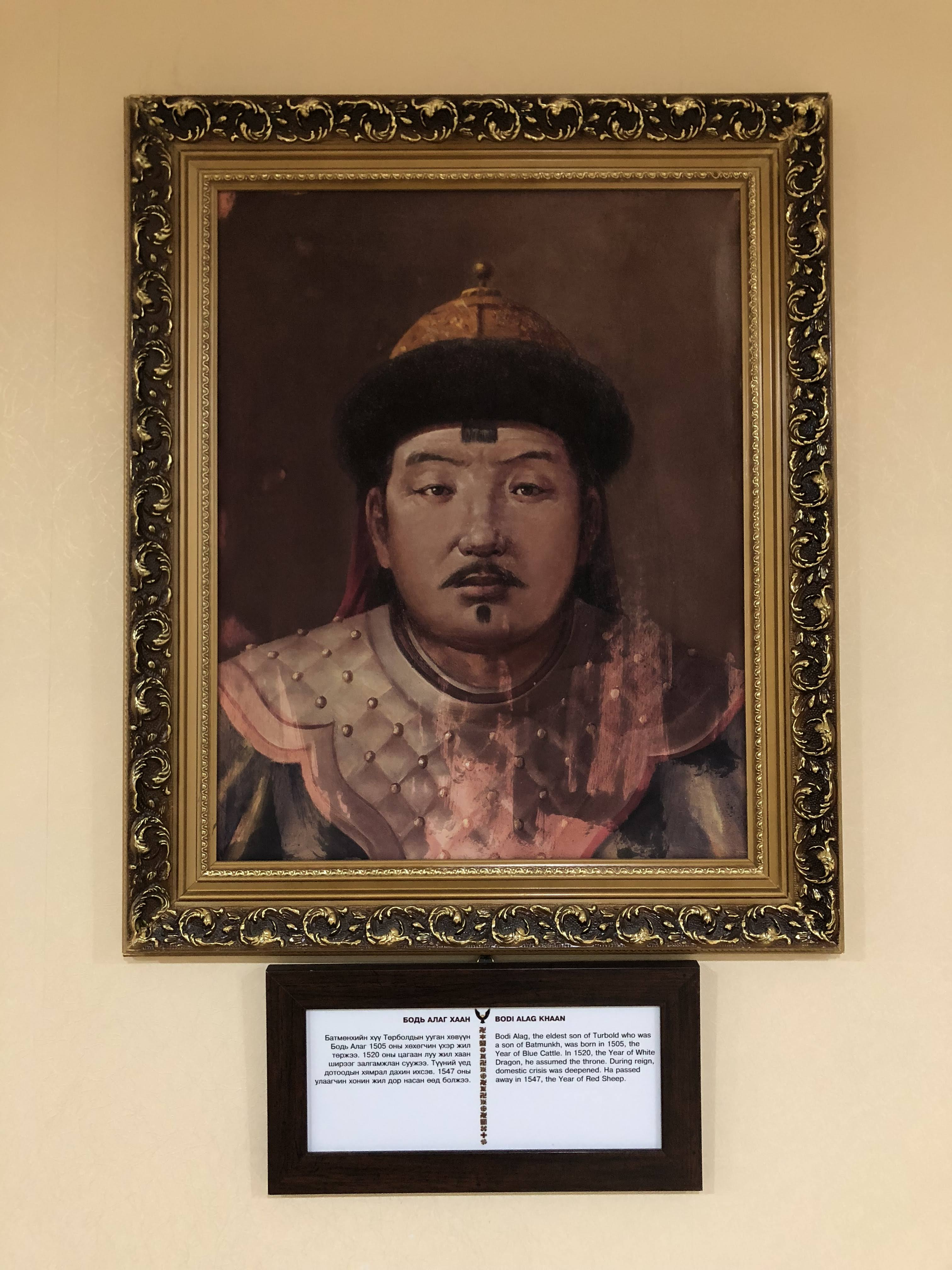

Khagan of the Northern Yuan dynasty
- Reign: 1519 – 26 July 1547
- Predecessor: Bars Bolud Jinong
- Successor: Darayisung Gödeng Khan
- Born: 1504
- Died: 1547 (aged 42–43)
- House: Borjigin
- Dynasty: Northern Yuan
- Father: Turbolad

Alagh Khan (Mongolian: Алаг Хаан; Chinese: 阿拉克汗), born Bodi (Mongolian: Боди; Chinese: 博迪), (1504 – 26 July 1547) was a khagan of the Northern Yuan dynasty, reigning from 1519 to 26 July 1547.

Some sources indicate that Bodi Alagh Khan was Turbolad's eldest child, but others record him as Ulusbold's son. And he was handpicked by his grandfather Dayan Khan as his successor. However, after the death of Dayan Khan, Bars Bolud Jinong, Dayan Khan's third son, proclaimed himself as the great khan, claiming that Bodi Alagh Khan was too young and too inexperienced to maintain the large Mongol empire, and he was able to rally support from some Mongol populace who feared that after a century of fighting, the unification and prosperity finally achieved by Dayan Khan was to be lost and a more experience leader was needed.

Although Bodi Alagh Khan never officially and formally gave up the title of khan, it was not until more than three years later when Dayan Khan's fourth son joined him did he become powerful enough to challenge Bars Bolud Jinong for the crown of khan. Bloodshed was successfully avoided among fellow Mongols when a compromise was reached: Bars Bolud Jinong would give up the crown and Bodi Alagh Khan would be the new Great Khan of Mongols, while his sons were also named as different khans. However, the loss of the crown of Great Khan of Mongol was too much for Bars Bolud Jinong and he soon died afterward. When Bodi died in 1547, he was succeeded by his eldest son, Daraisung Guden Khan.

== See also ==
- List of khans of the Northern Yuan dynasty

Bodi Alagh Khan House of Borjigin Died: 1519-1547
Regnal titles
Preceded by Bars Bolud Jinong	Khagan of the Northern Yuan dynasty 1519 – 26 July 1547	Succeeded by Darayisung Gödeng Khan
