= Taiji (Mongol title) =

Mongol title

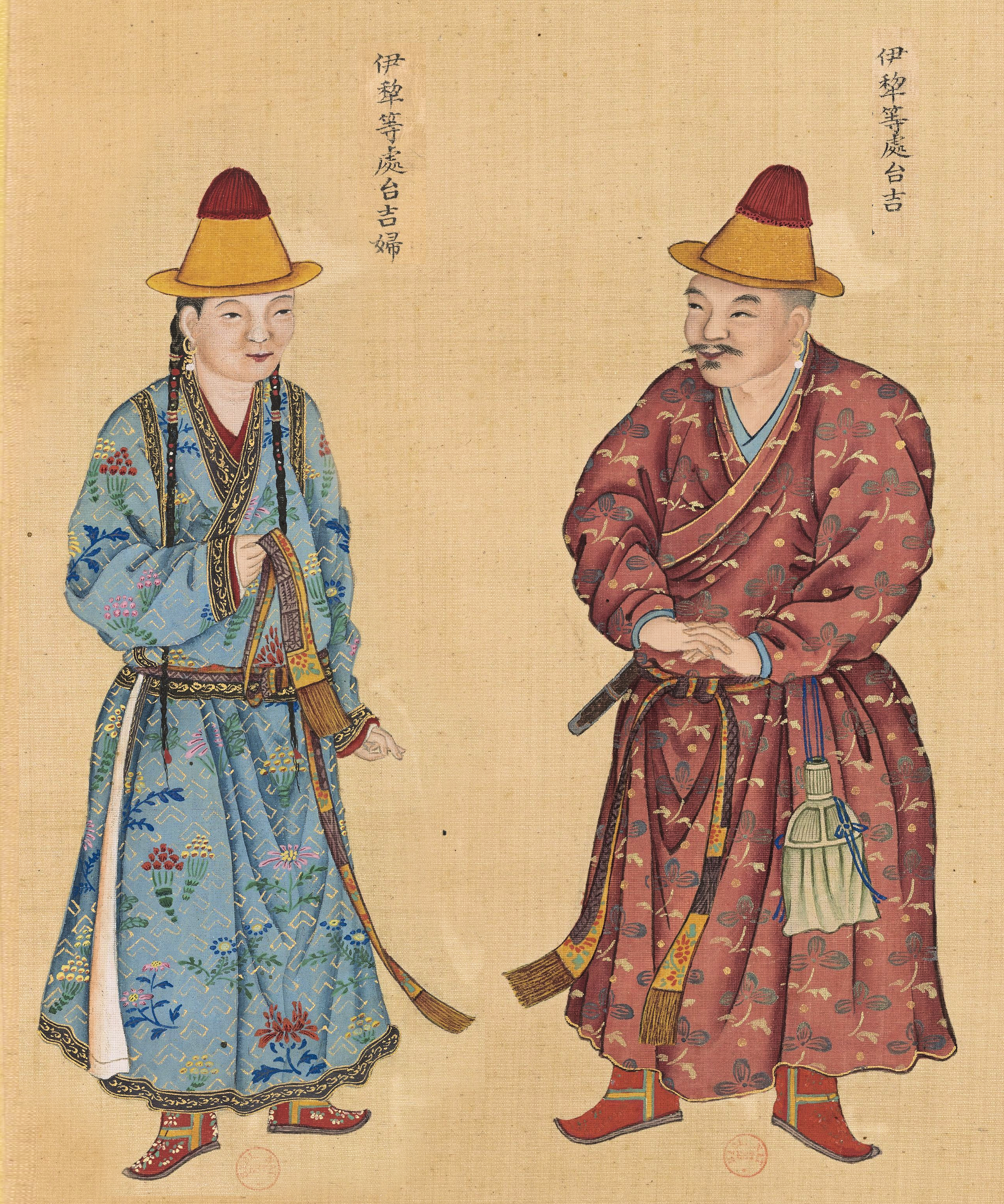
Ili region Taiji (Chinese: 台吉, Mongol Prince) and his wife, Huang Qing Zhigong Tu, 1769.

Taiji (Mongolian: Тайж, 台吉, originally from Chinese: 太子) was a title of the nobility among the Mongols from the 16th century. The title originated from Chinese Taizi (heir apparent son of the emperor) and was first used for the proliferating aristocracy composed of sons and descendants of Batu-Möngke Dayan Khan (1480?–1517?). This is the same as Khong Tayji and after the 15th century, the Mongolians used its short form Taiji and, unlike the previous period, princes of the Oirats held the title as well at the same time.

It is not to be confused with taishi, which was always given to non-royal blood nobles.
