= List of Mongolians =

This is a list of notable historical and living Mongolians (of Mongolia, a landlocked country in East Asia with about 3 million inhabitants as of 2015, or the Mongolian diaspora) and of people of Mongolian descent, sorted by field and name:

== Athletes ==
=== Wrestlers ===
- Oleg Alekseev (1953–2015), Buryat wrestler, won a gold medal at the 1979 European Wrestling Championships.
- Tömöriin Artag (1943–1993), wrestler, won a bronze medal at the 1968 Summer Olympics.
- Aduuchiin Baatarkhüü (b. 1956), wrestler, won a silver medal at the 1978 Asian Games and the 1990 Asian Games, and a silver medal at the 1989 Asian Championships.
- Aldar Balzhinimayev (b. 1993), wrestler, won a gold medal at the 2010 Summer Youth Olympics.
- Khaltmaagiin Battulga (b. 1963), politician and sambo wrestler, won two silver medals (1986, 1990) and a gold medal (1983) at the World Sambo Championships.
- Khorloogiin Bayanmönkh (b. 1944), wrestler, 1975 World Champion, won several silver medals at the World Championships, and a silver medal at the 1972 Summer Olympics.
- Altantsetsegiin Battsetseg (b. 1994), wrestler, won a bronze medal at the 2018 Asian Games.
- Baatarzorigyn Battsetseg, wrestler, won a gold medal at the 2010 Summer Youth Olympics.
- Soronzonboldyn Battsetseg (b. 1990), wrestler, 2010 and 2015 World Champion, bronze medal at the 2012 Summer Olympics.
- Buyanjavyn Batzorig (b. 1983), won a bronze medal at the 2006 Asian Games, and a silver medal and two bronze medals at the Asian Championships.
- Bazar Bazarguruev (b. 1985), Buryat wrestler, won a bronze medal at the 2008 Summer Olympics, a bronze medal at the 2007 World Wrestling Championships and a gold medal at the 2007 Asian Championships.
- Erdenebatyn Bekhbayar (b. 1992), wrestler, won a gold medal at the 2018 Asian Games, a gold medal at the 2015 Asian Wrestling Championships, and two bronze medals at the World Wrestling Championships.
- Aleksandr Bogomoev (b. 1989), Buryat wrestler, won a gold medal at the 2015 European Games and a gold medal at the 2020 European Wrestling Championships.
- Buyandelgeriin Bold (b. 1960), wrestler, won a gold medal at the 1982 Asian Games.
- Bat-Ochiryn Bolortuyaa (b. 1997), wrestler, won a bronze medal at the 2020 Summer Olympics.
- Jamtsyn Bor (b. 1958), wrestler, won a silver medal at the 1978 Asian Games.
- Ochirbatyn Burmaa (b. 1982), wrestler, won a gold medal at the 2016 Asian Wrestling Championships, a silver medal at the 2009 World Wrestling Championships, two more bronze medals at the World Wrestling Championships and several bronze and silver medals at the Asian Wrestling Championships.
- Sündeviin Byambatseren (b. 1990), wrestler, won a silver medal at the 2014 Asian Games and a bronze medal at the 2010 Asian Wrestling Championships.
- Jargalsaikhany Chuluunbat (b. 1984), wrestler, won a silver medal at the 2010 Asian Games, two silver medals and three bronze medals at the Asian Wrestling Championships.
- Chimedbazaryn Damdinsharav (b. 1945), wrestler, won a bronze medal at the 1968 Summer Olympics.
- Khutulun (c. 1260 – c. 1306), noblewoman and wrestler.
- Jamtsyn Davaajav (b. 1953), wrestler, won a bronze medal at the 1978 Asian Games and a silver medal at the 1980 Summer Olympics.
- Zevegiin Düvchin (b. 1955), wrestler, won a gold medal at the 1982 Asian Games.
- Lodoin Enkhbayar (b. 1964), wrestler, won a gold medal at the 1991 Asian Wrestling Championships, a silver medal at the 1990 Asian Games, and two additional bronze medals at the Asian Wrestling Championships.
- Tsogtbazaryn Enkhjargal (b. 1981), wrestler, won two gold medals at the Asian Championships, two bronze medals at the Asian Games and a bronze medal at the World Championships.
- Ochirdolgoryn Enkhtaivan (b. 1952), wrestler, won a bronze medal at the 1973 World Championships.
- Dorjzovdyn Ganbat (b. 1950), wrestler, won a bronze medal at the 1978 Asian Games.
- Chagnaadorjiin Ganzorig (b. 1982), wrestler, won a gold medal at the 2006 Asian Wrestling Championships and two silver medals at the 2007 and 2008 Asian Wrestling Championships.
- Chimidiin Gochoosüren (b. 1953), wrestler, won a silver medal at the 1978 Asian Games.
- Tserenbaataryn Khosbayar (b. 1965), wrestler, won a bronze medal at the 1990 Asian Games and two silver medals at the Asian Championships.
- Ganzorigiin Mandakhnaran (b. 1986), wrestler, won a gold medal at the 2010 Asian Games, three silver medals and a bronze medal at the Asian Championships, and two bronze medals at the World Wrestling Championships (2013, 2014).
- Jigjidiin Mönkhbat (b. 1941), wrestler, third place at the 1967 World Championships, won a silver medal at the 1968 Summer Olympics.
- Tungalagiin Mönkhtuyaa (b. 1988), wrestler, won two bronze medals at the World Wrestling Championships, a silver medal at the 2013 Wrestling World Cup and a silver medal at the 2013 Asian Wrestling Championships.
- Bayaraagiin Naranbaatar (b. 1980), wrestler, bronze medal at the 2005 World Championships and silver medal at the 2007 World Championships.
- Ochirbatyn Nasanburmaa (b. 1989), wrestler, won a gold medal at the 2013 Asian Wrestling Championships, three bronze medals and a silver medal (at the 2018 World Wrestling Championships) at the World Championships.
- Enkhsaikhany Nyam-Ochir (b. 1985), wrestler, won a bronze medal at the 2014 World Wrestling Championships and a bronze medal at the 2007 Asian Championships.
- Zevegiin Oidov (b. 1949), wrestler, World Champion in 1974 and 1975, silver medal at the 1976 Summer Olympics.
- Badrakhyn Odonchimeg (b. 1981), wrestler, won a bronze medal at the 2009 World Championships, a bronze medal at the 2006 Asian Games and several silver and bronze medals at the Asian Wrestling Championships.
- Irina Ologonova, Buryat wrestler, won a gold medal at the 2016 European Wrestling Championships and three silver medals at the World Wrestling Championships.
- Pürevjavyn Önörbat (b. 1988), wrestler, won a silver medal at the 2015 World Wrestling Championships, two silver medals and three bronze medals at the Asian Championships.
- Pürevdorjiin Orkhon (b. 1993), won a gold medal at the 2017 World Championships, a silver medal at the 2014 Asian Wrestling Championships and a gold medal at the 2018 Asian Wrestling Championships.
- Gelegjamtsyn Ösökhbayar (b. 1973), wrestler, won a gold medal at the 2001 Asian Wrestling Championships, and a bronze medal at the 1998 Asian Games.
- Naidangiin Otgonjargal (b. 1979), wrestler, won a gold medal at the 2003 Asian Wrestling Championships, two additional bronze medals at the Asian Wrestling Championships and two bronze medals at the Asian Championships.
- Davaasükhiin Otgontsetseg (b. 1990), wrestler, won a gold medal at the 2016 Asian Wrestling Championships, two more medals at the Asian Championships, a silver medal at the 2011 World Championships and a bronze medal at the 2016 World Championships.
- Dugarsürengiin Oyuunbold (b. 1957), wrestler, third place at the 1978 World Championships, bronze medal at the 1980 Summer Olympics.
- Banzragchiin Oyuunsüren (b. 1989), wrestler, won a silver medal at the 2011 World Championships and a silver medal at the 2010 Asian Championships.
- Oyuunbilegiin Pürevbaatar (b. 1973), wrestler, won a gold medal at the 2002 Asian Games, a gold medal at the 1997 Asian Championships, a gold medal at the 1997 East Asian Games, and two silver medals at the World Championships (2001, 2002).
- Mingiyan Semenov (b. 1990), wrestler of Kalmyk descent, World Champion, European Champion, bronze medal at the 2012 Summer Olympics.
- Danzandarjaagiin Sereeter (b. 1943), wrestler, won a silver medal at the 1974 Asian Games and a bronze medal at the 1968 Summer Olympics.
- Dolgorsürengiin Serjbüdee (b. 1976), professional wrestler.
- Baatarjavyn Shoovdor (b. 1990), wrestler, won two bronze medals at the World Wrestling Championships, a silver and a bronze medals at the Asian Wrestling Championships.
- Puntsagiin Sükhbat (b. 1964), wrestler, won a gold medal at 1990 Asian Games, two gold medals (1989, 1992) and a bronze medal (1993) at the Asian Championships, and a bronze medal at the 1990 World Wrestling Championships.
- Erdenechimegiin Sumiyaa (b. 1990), wrestler, won a silver medal at the 2013 World Championships, a bronze medal at the Asian Games and a silver medal at the Asian Championships.
- Sükheegiin Tserenchimed (b. 1995), wrestler, won a gold medal at the 2014 World Championships, two bronze medals at the Asian Championships and a bronze (1993) medal at the 2014 Asian Games.
- Dashdorjiin Tserentogtokh (1951–2015), wrestler, won a gold medal at the 1974 Asian Games and a silver medal at the 1982 Asian Games.
- Tserenbaataryn Tsogtbayar (b. 1970), wrestler, won a gold medal at the 1994 Asian Games and a gold medal at the 1993 Asian Wrestling Championships. He won additional silver and bronze medals at the Asian Championships and Asian Games respectively and a bronze medal at the 1993 World Wrestling Championships.
- Orgodolyn Üitümen (b. 1989), wrestler, won two silver medals and a bronze medal at the Asian Wrestling Championships and a bronze medal at the 2018 Asian Games.
- Natsagsürengiin Zolboo (b. 1990), wrestler, won a silver medal (2014) and four bronze medals at the Asian Wrestling Championships.
- Tümendembereliin Züünbayan (b. 1974), wrestler, won a gold medal at the 2001 Asian Wrestling Championships, a bronze medal at the 1995 Asian Wrestling Championships, and a silver medal at the 1994 Asian Games.
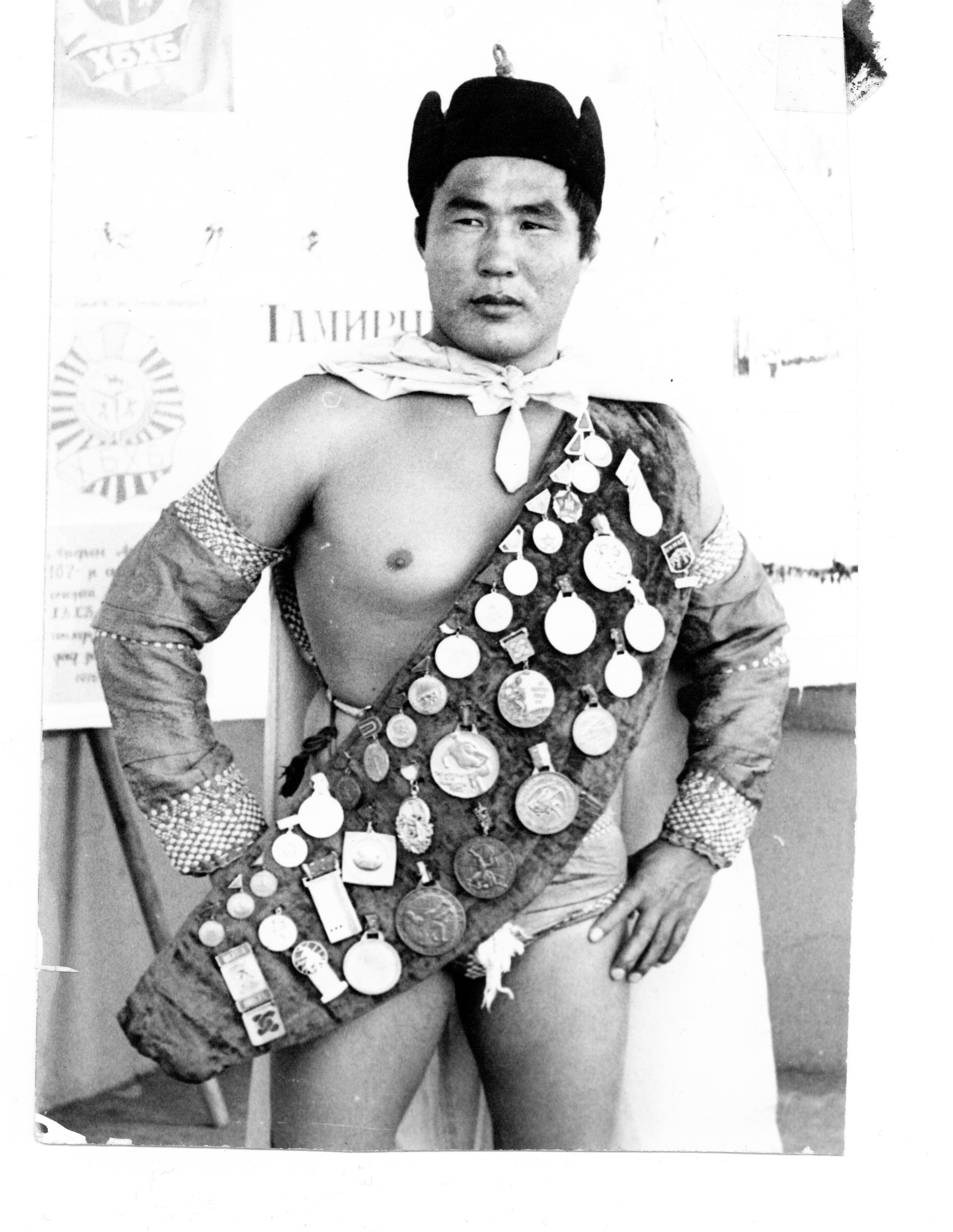
Artag

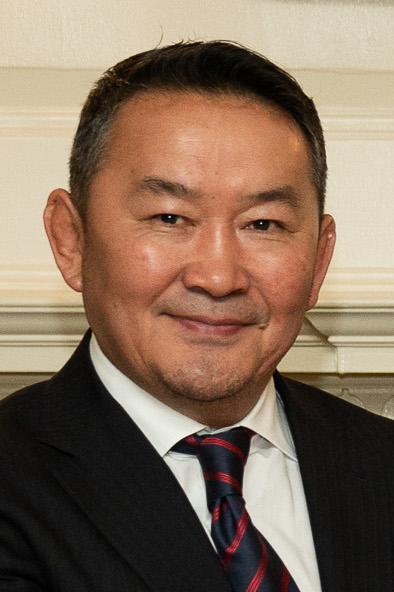
Battulga

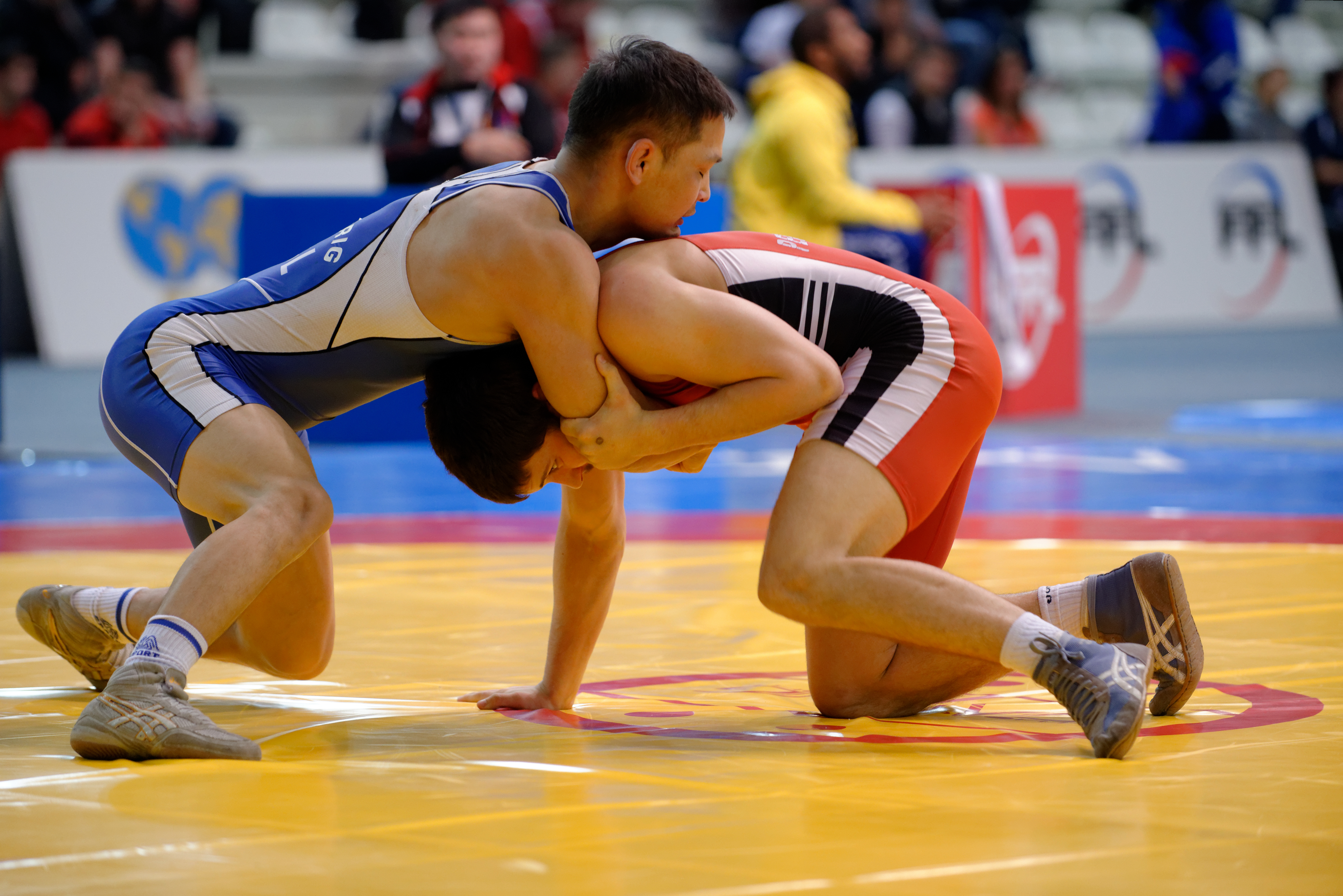
Batzorig

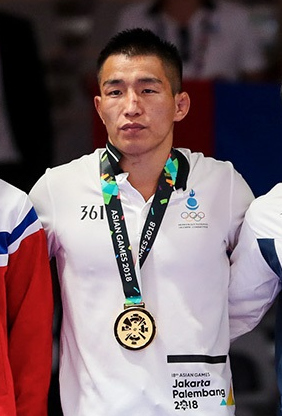
Bekhbayar

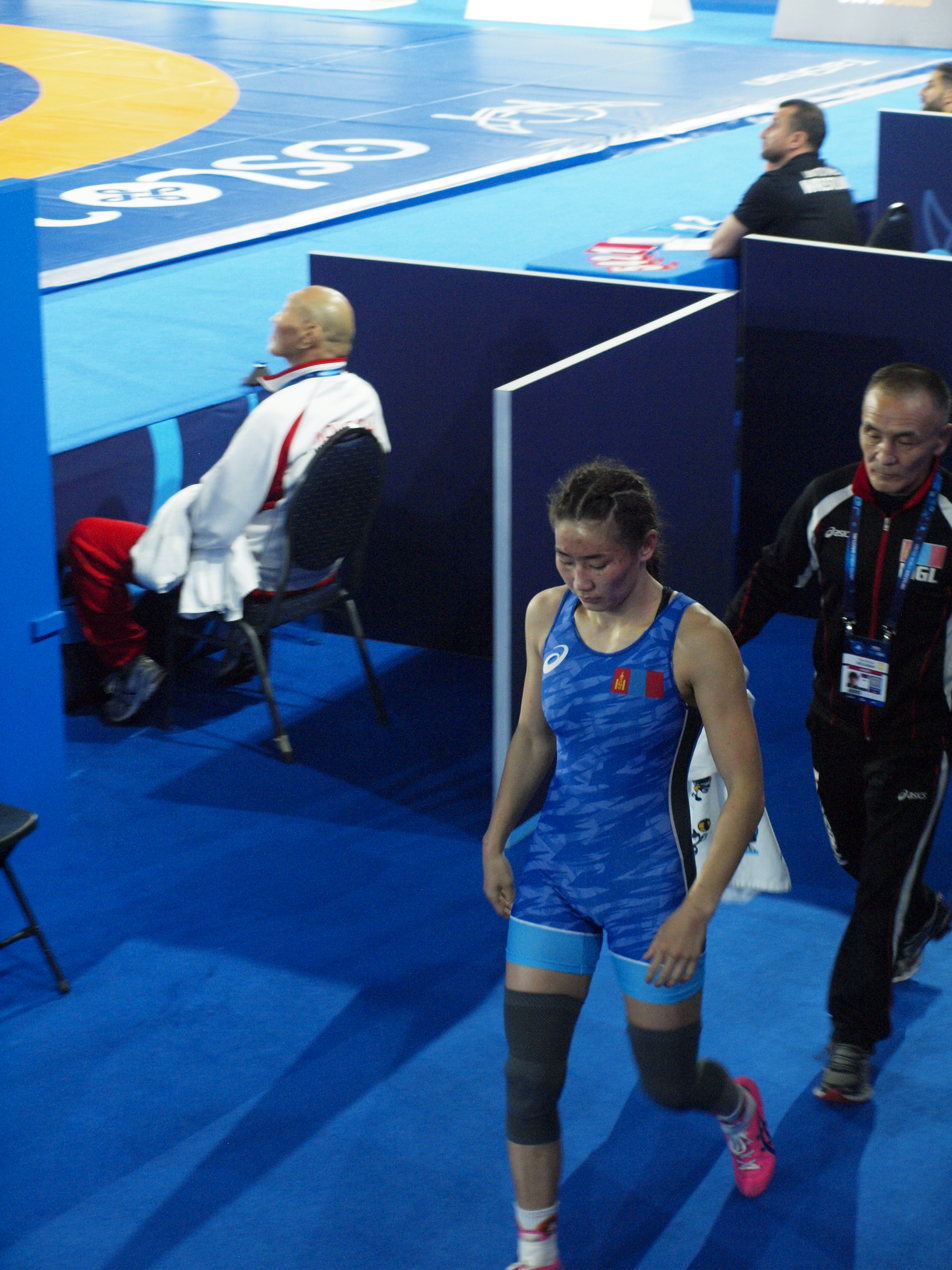
Bolortuyaa

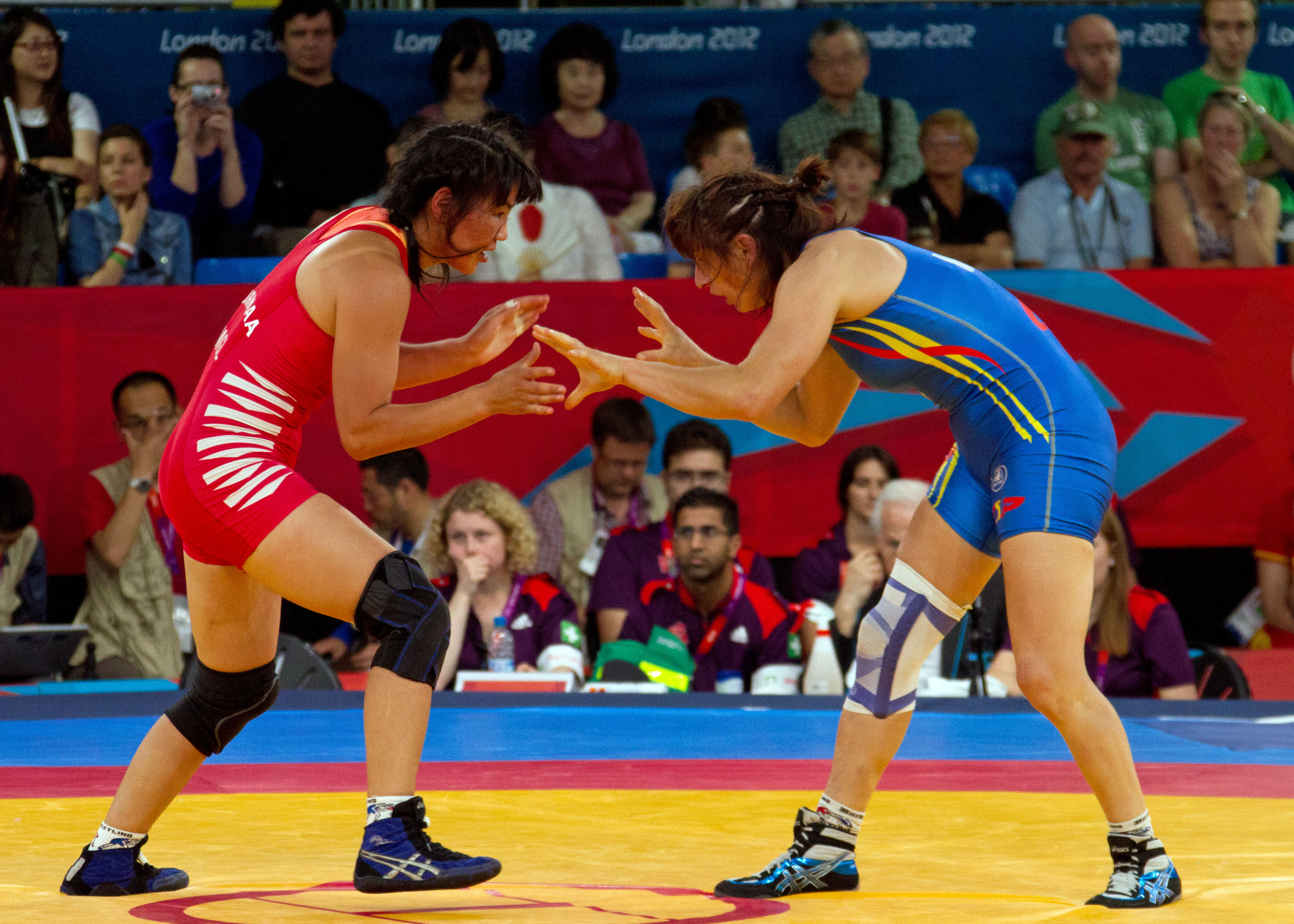
Burmaa

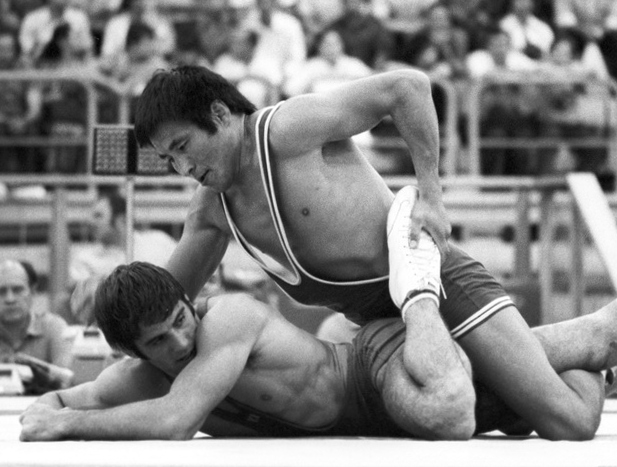
Davaajav

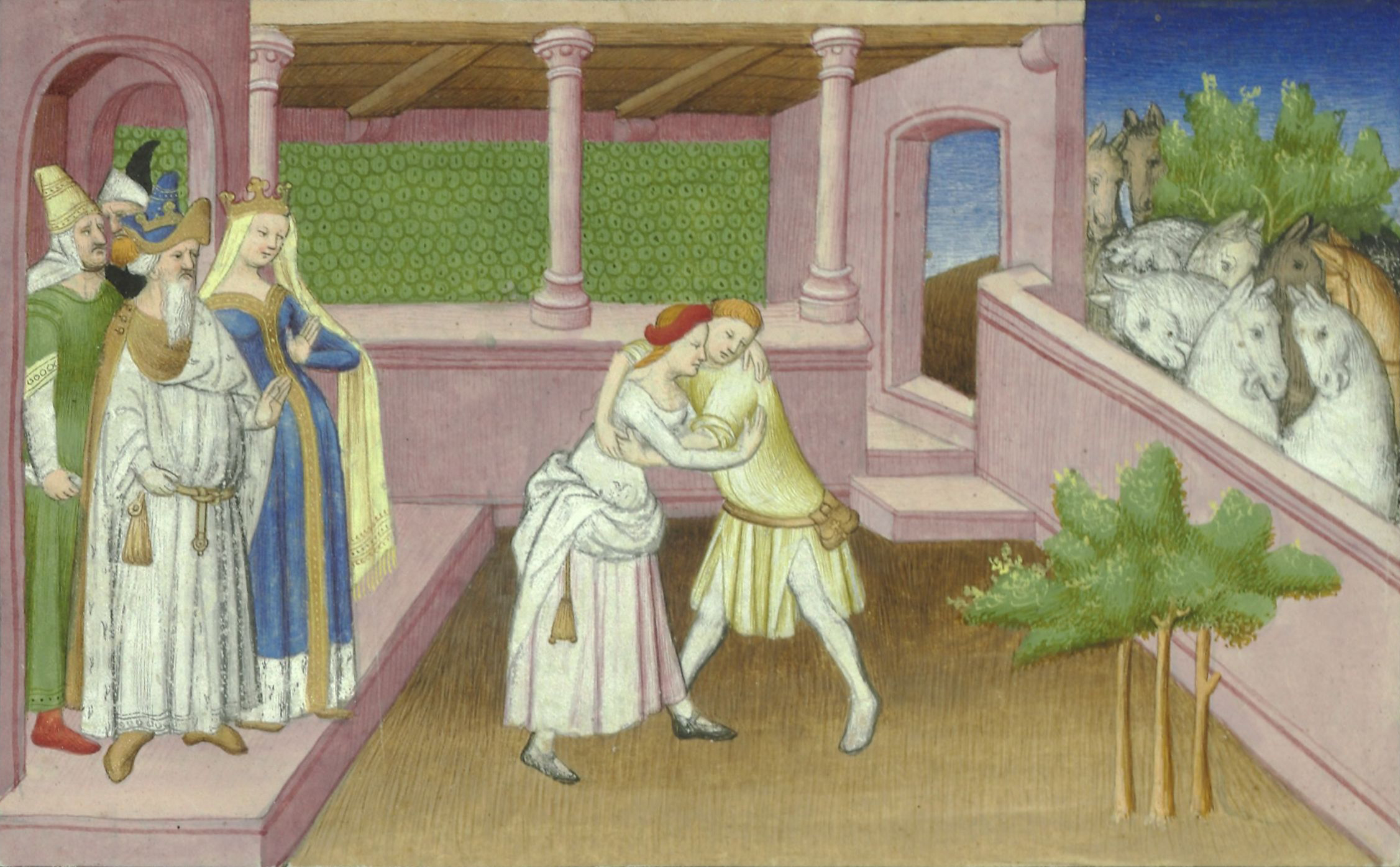
Khutulun

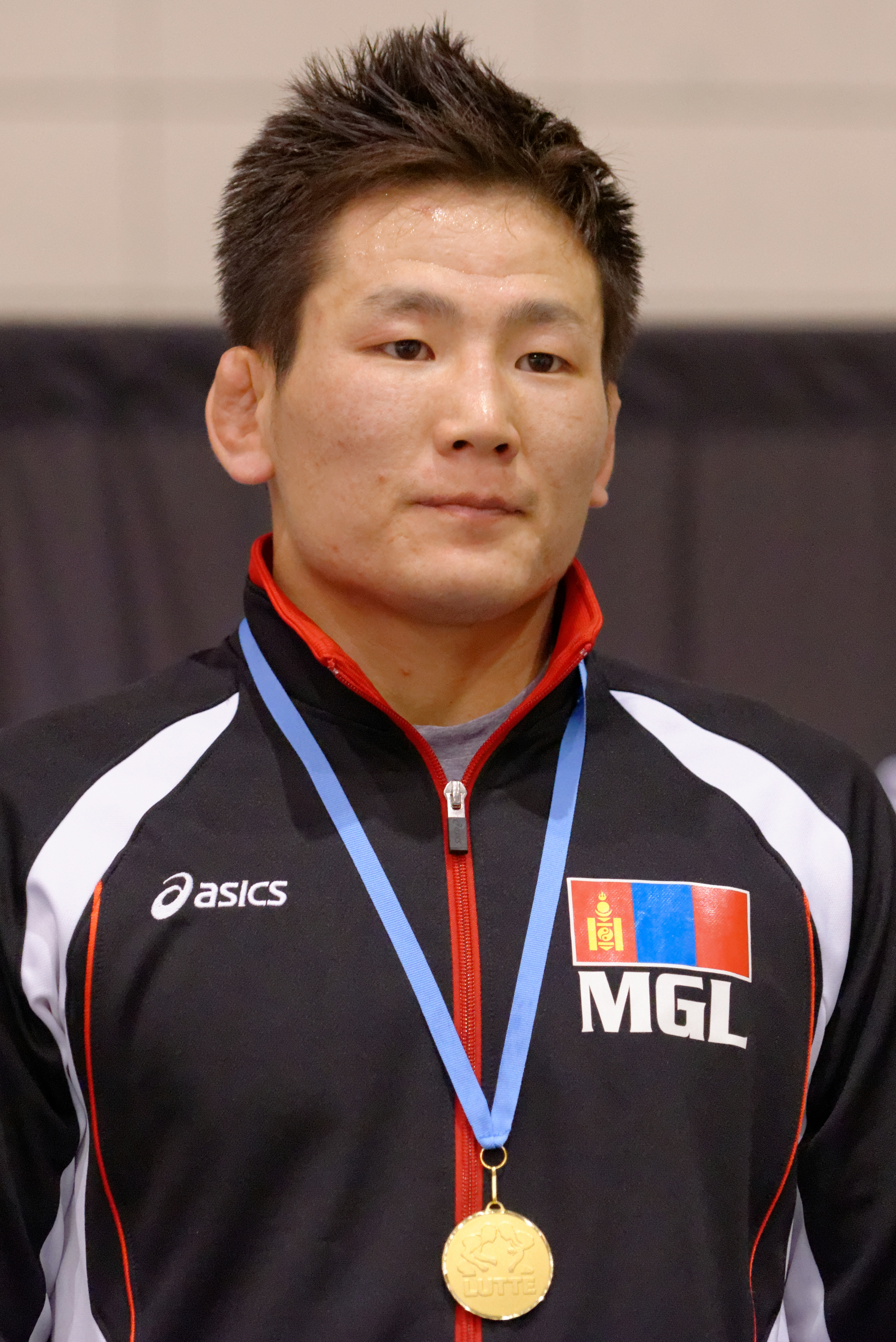
Mandakhnaran

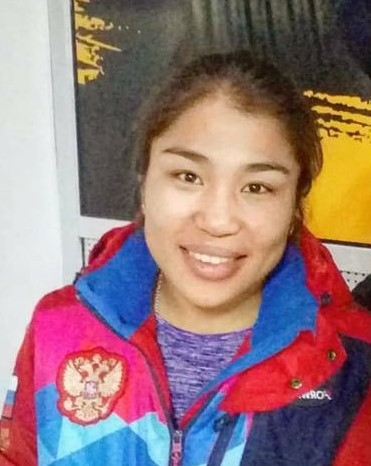
Ologonova

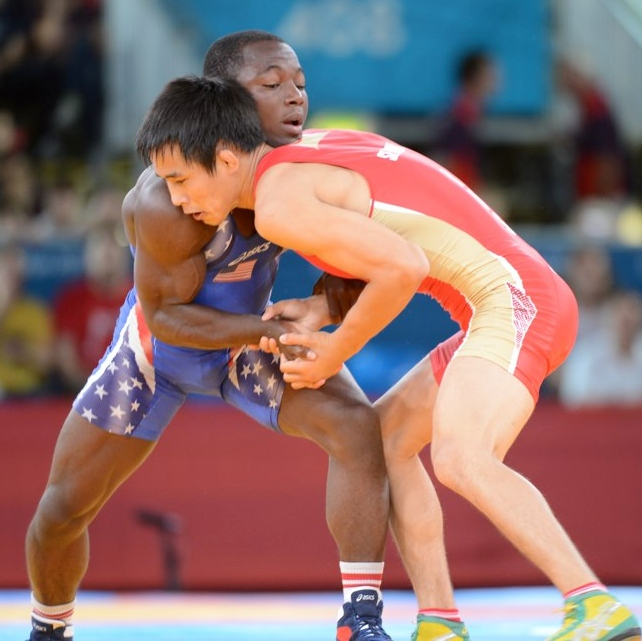
Semenov

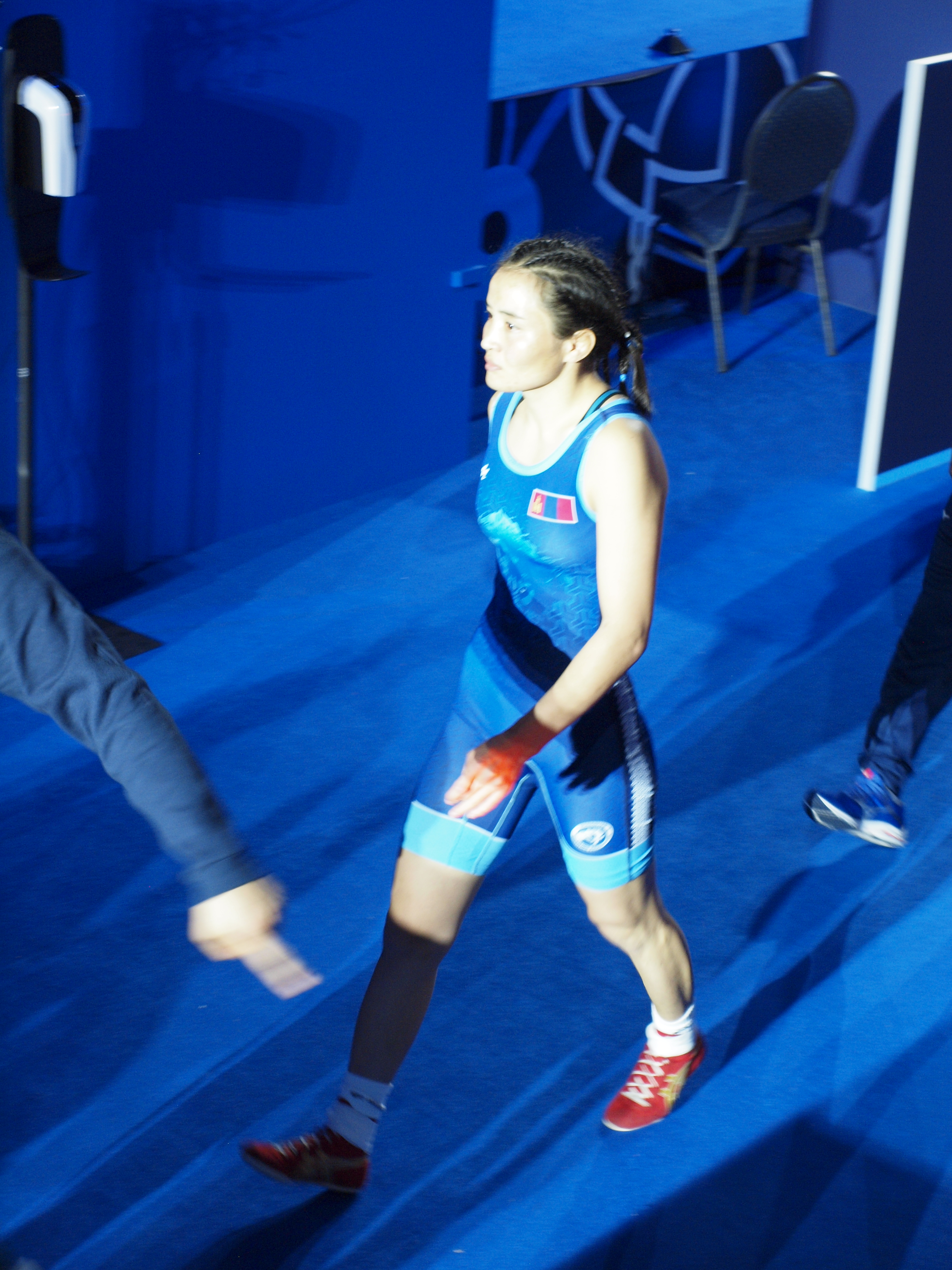
Shoovdor

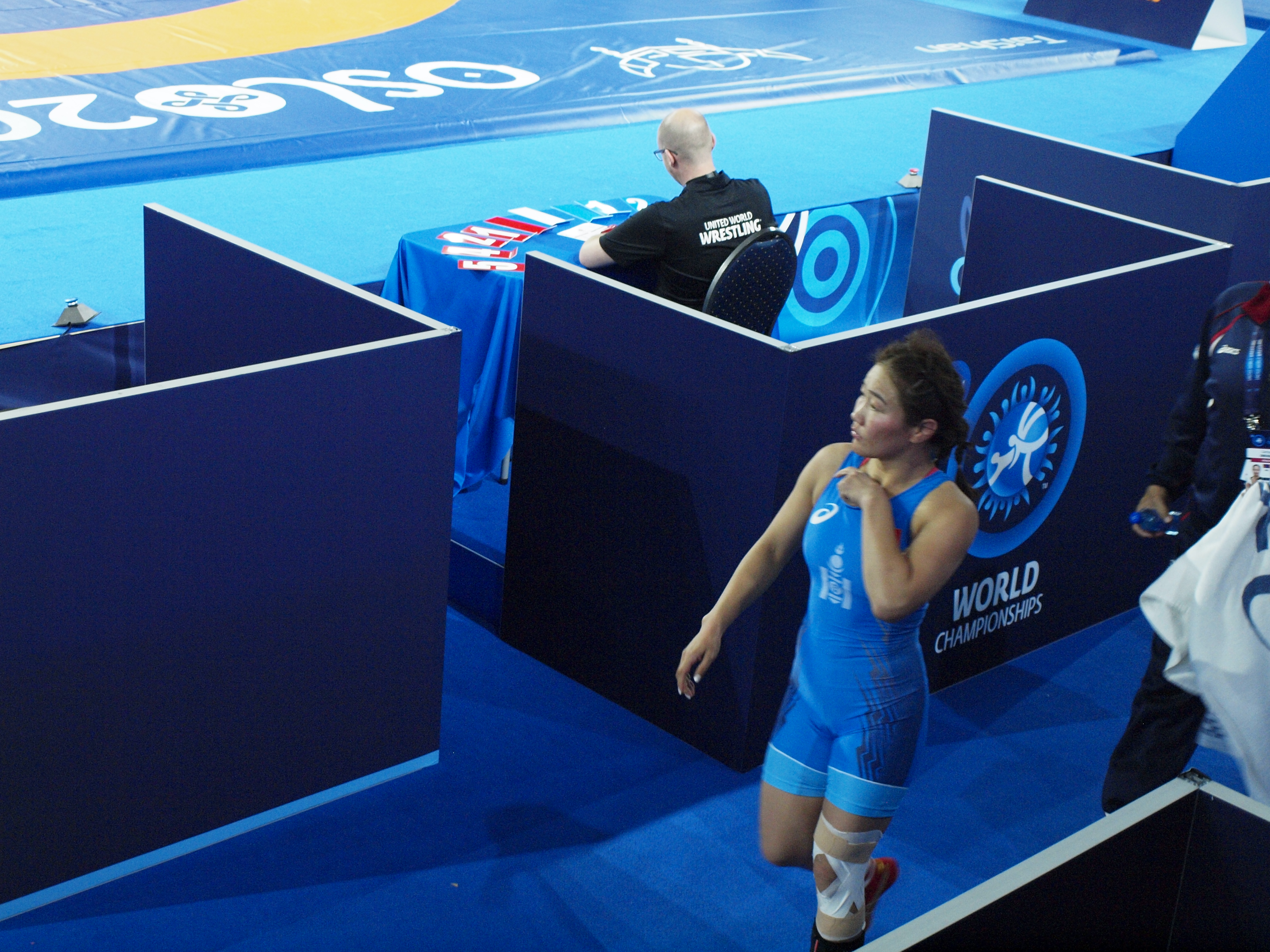
Sumiyaa

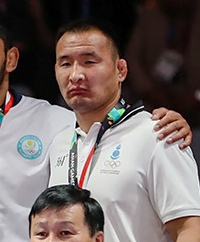
Üitümen

=== Sumo wrestlers ===
See also: List of Mongolian sumo wrestlers
- Arawashi Tsuyoshi (b. 1986), professional sumo wrestler who won three kinboshi or gold stars for defeating a yokozuna, maegashira 2.
- Asasekiryū Tarō (b. 1983), sumo professional wrestler, sekiwake.
- Asashōryū Akinori (b. 1980), professional sumo wrestler, the 68th yokozuna in history, one of the most successful yokozuna ever. In 2005, he became the first wrestler to win all six official tournaments (honbasho) in a single year.
- Azumaryū Tsuyoshi (b. 1987), professional sumo wrestler, maegashira.
- Chiyoshōma Fujio (b. 1991), professional sumo wrestler, maegashira.
- Daishōhō Kiyohiro (b. 1994), professional sumo wrestler, maegashira.
- Hakuba Takeshi (b. 1983), sumo professional wrestler, komusubi.
- Hakuhō Shō (b. 1985), professional sumo wrestler, yokozuna, holder of several world records in Sumo; one of the only six rikishi to have their name inscribed in the Rikishi Monument for Over 50 Consecutive Wins at Tomioka Hachiman Shrine.
- Harumafuji Kōhei (b. 1984), professional sumo wrestler, the sport's 70th yokozuna from 2012 to 2017 and the 5th non-Japanese to attain Sumo's highest rank, the 8th rikishi with most top division wins in history (712).
- Hōshōryū Tomokatsu (b. 1999), professional sumo wrestler, maegashira.
- Ichinojō Takashi (b. 1993), sumo professional wrestler, sekiwake.
- Kagamiō Hideoki (b. 1988), professional sumo wrestler, maegashira.
- Kakuryū Rikisaburō (b. 1985), professional sumo wrestler, the 71st yokozuna in history.
- Kiribayama Tetsuo (b. 1996), professional sumo wrestler, maegashira 1.
- Kōryū Tadaharu (b. 1984), professional sumo wrestler, maegashira.
- Kyokushūhō Kōki (b. 1988), professional sumo wrestler, maegashira.
- Kyokushūzan Noboru (b. 1973), professional sumo wrestler, won five kinboshi or gold stars for defeating yokozuna; komusubi.
- Kyokutenhō Masaru (b. 1974), professional sumo wrestler, Yūshō-winner, who made more appearances in the top division than any other wrestler at 1470; sekiwake .
- Mōkonami Sakae (b. 1984), professional sumo wrestler, maegashira .
- Ryūō Noboru (b. 1983), professional sumo wrestler, maegashira.
- Seirō Takeshi (b. 1988), professional sumo wrestler, maegashira.
- Shōtenrō Taishi (b. 1982), professional sumo wrestler, maegashira.
- Takanoiwa Yoshimori (b. 1990), professional sumo wrestler, maegashira.
- Tamawashi Ichirō (b. 1984), professional sumo wrestler, sekiwake, holding three gold stars for defeating a yokozuna.
- Terunofuji Haruo (b. 1991), professional sumo wrestler, twice ōzeki, who made an unparalleled comeback in sumo history.
- Tokitenkū Yoshiaki (1979–2017), professional sumo wrestler, komusubi.
- Tokusegawa Masanao (b. 1983), professional sumo wrestler, maegashira .
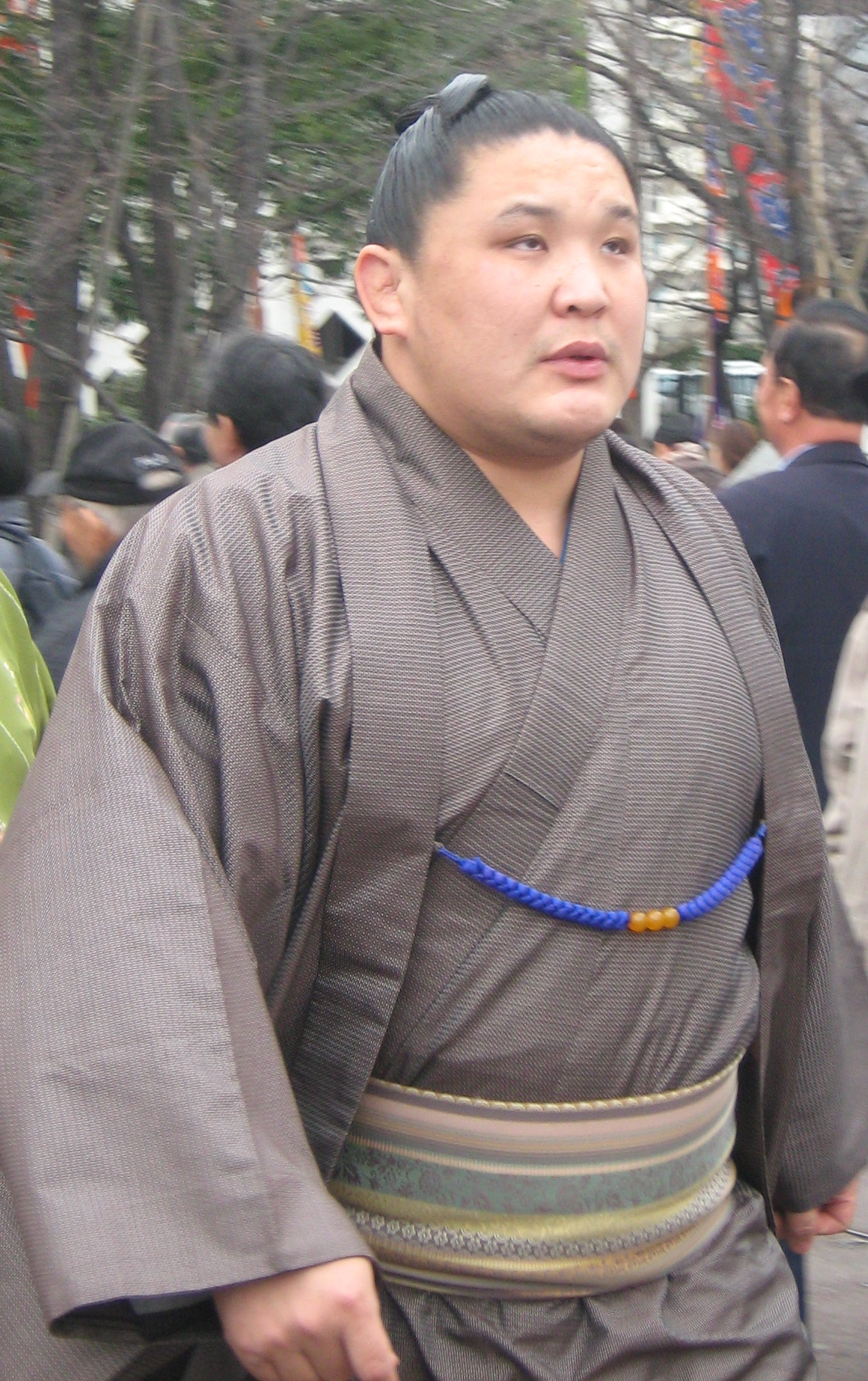
Asasekiryū

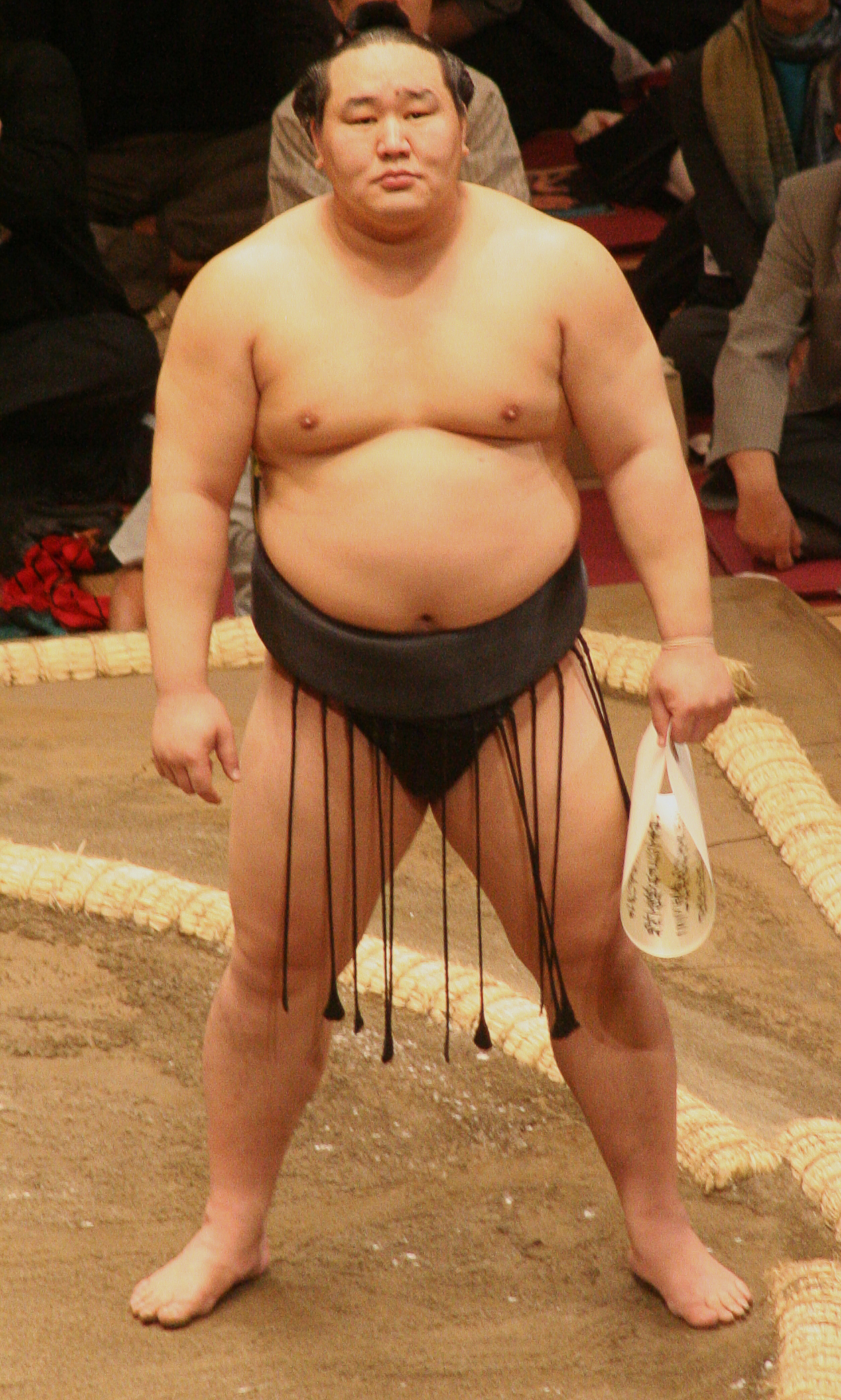
Asashōryū

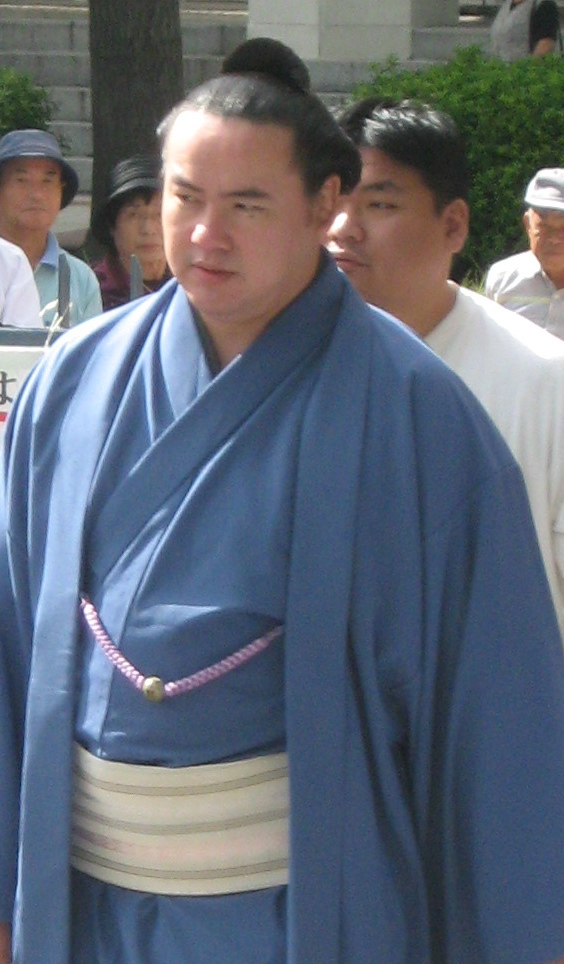
Hakuba

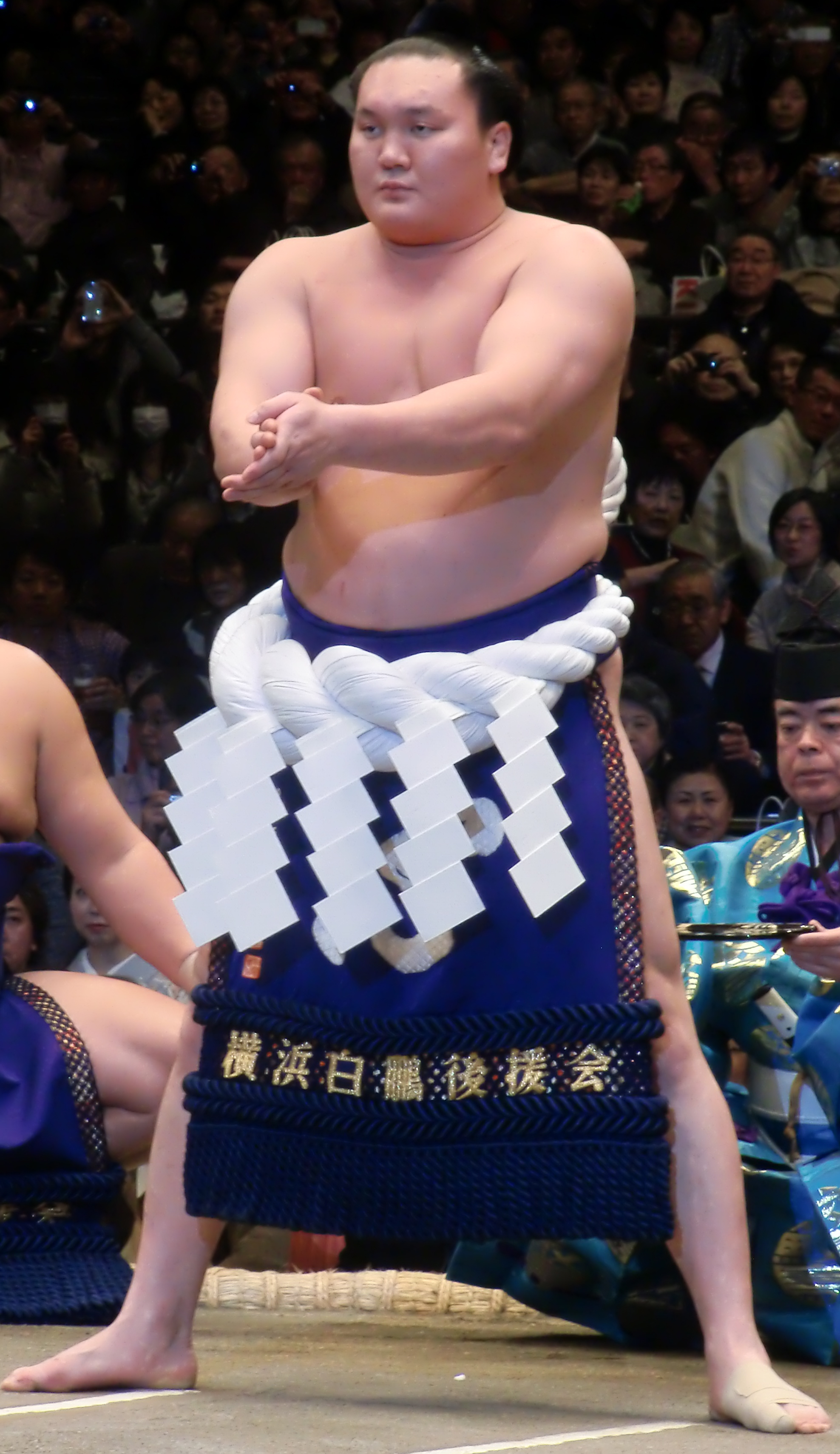
Hakuhō

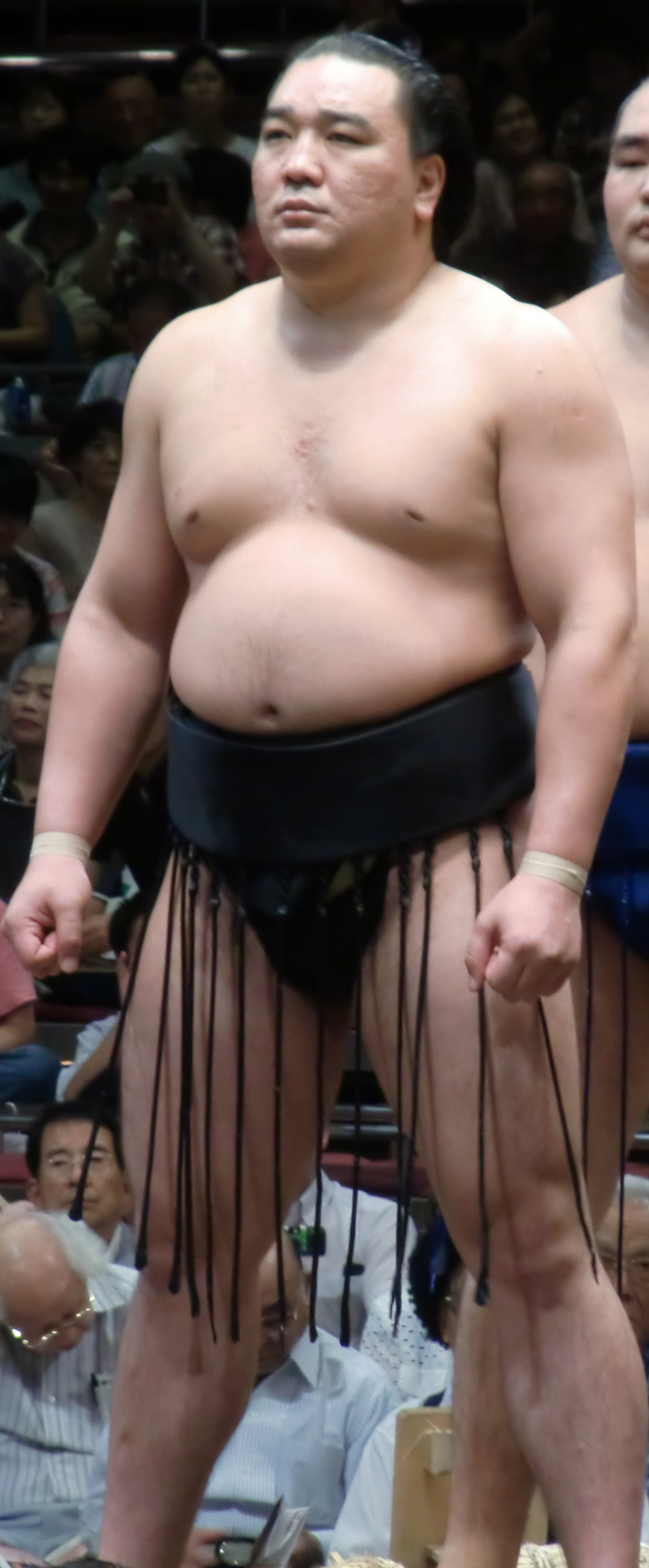
Harumafuji

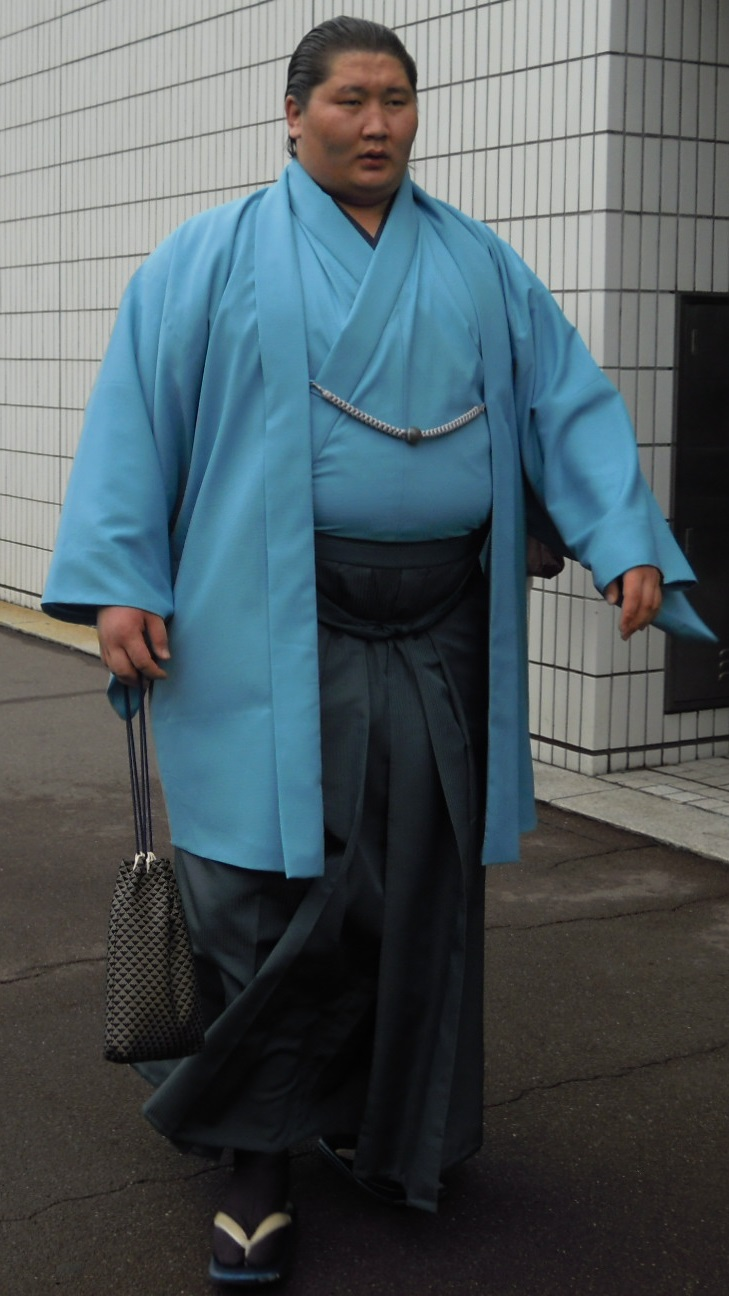
Ichinojō

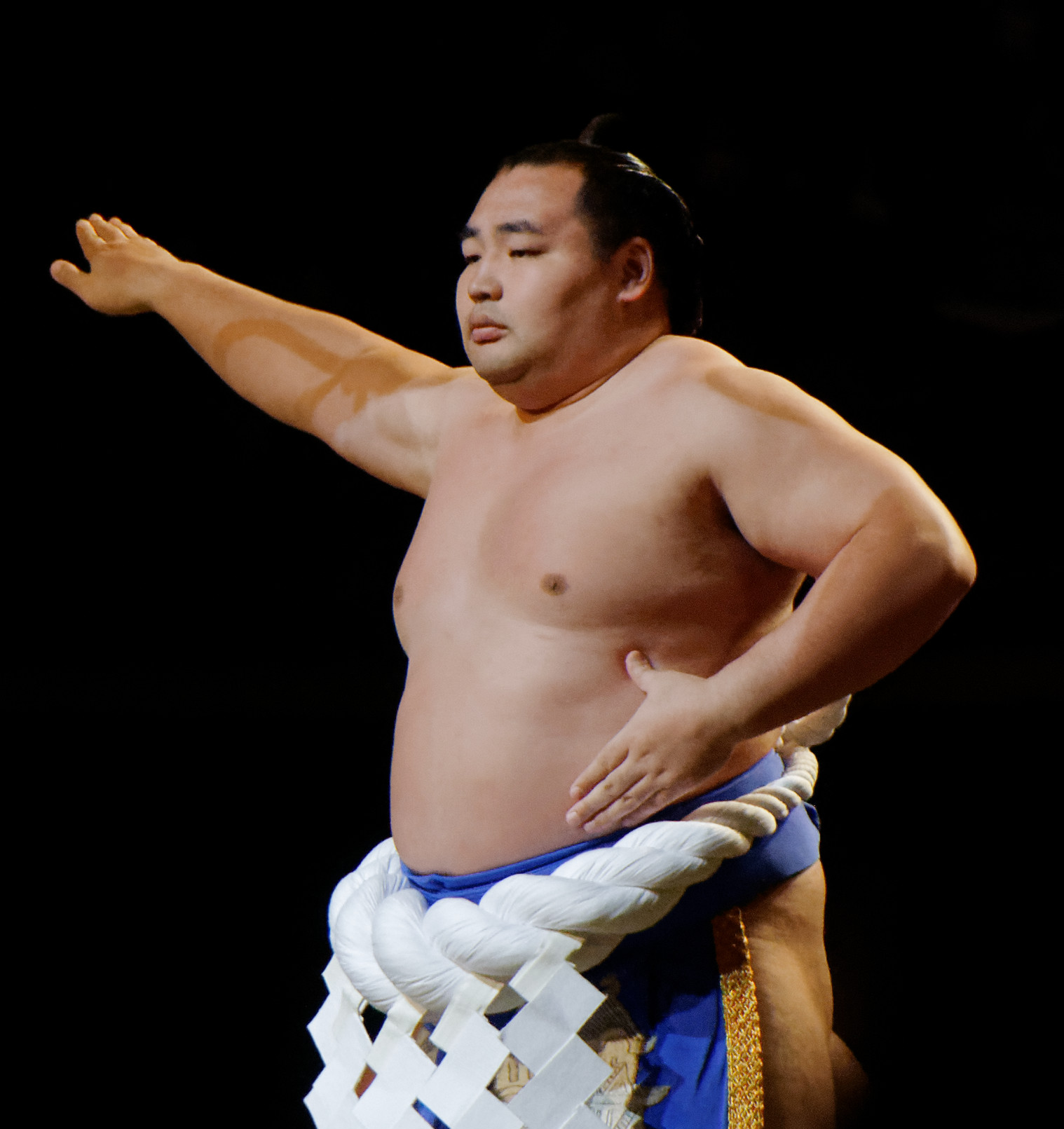
Kakuryū

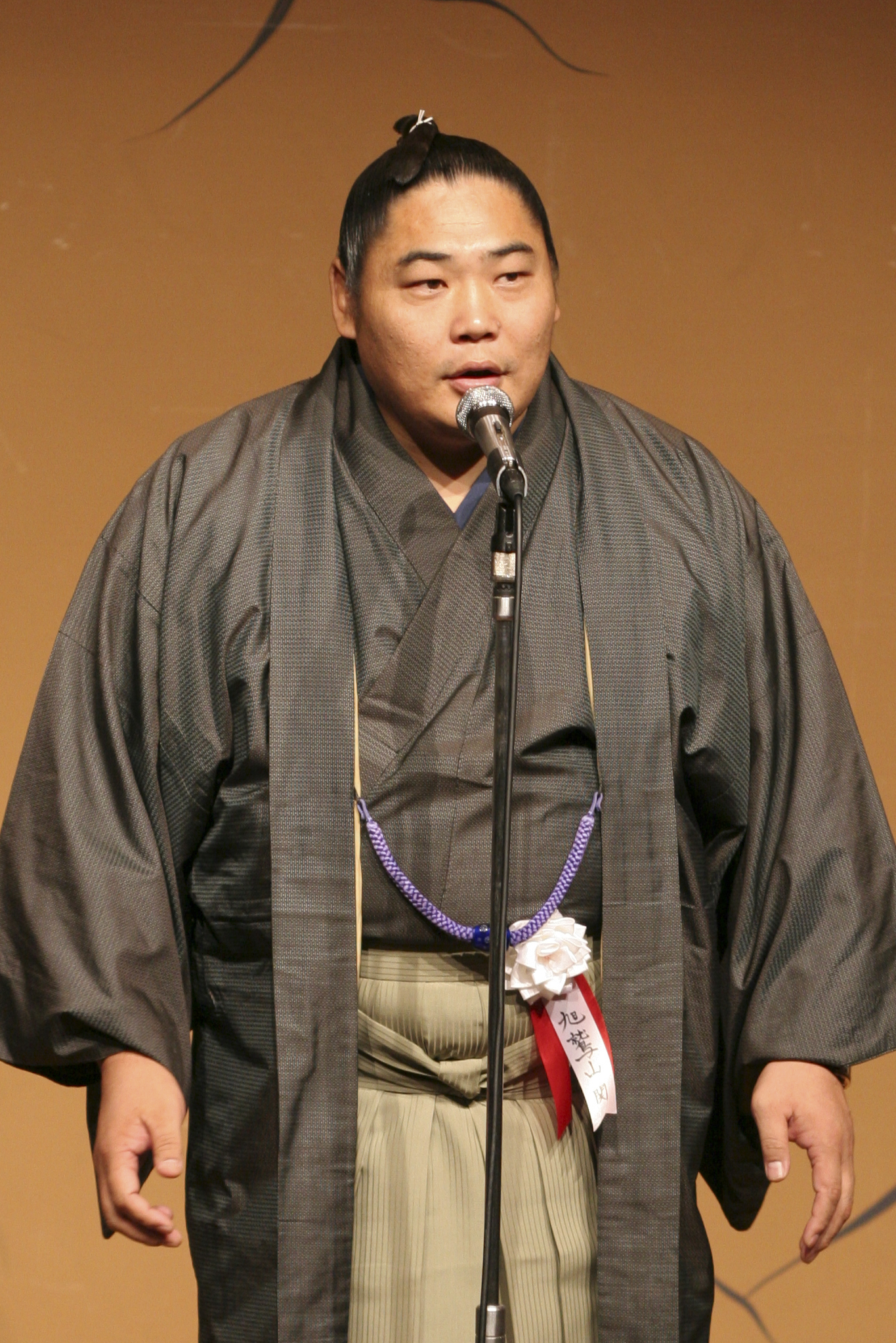
Kyokushūzan

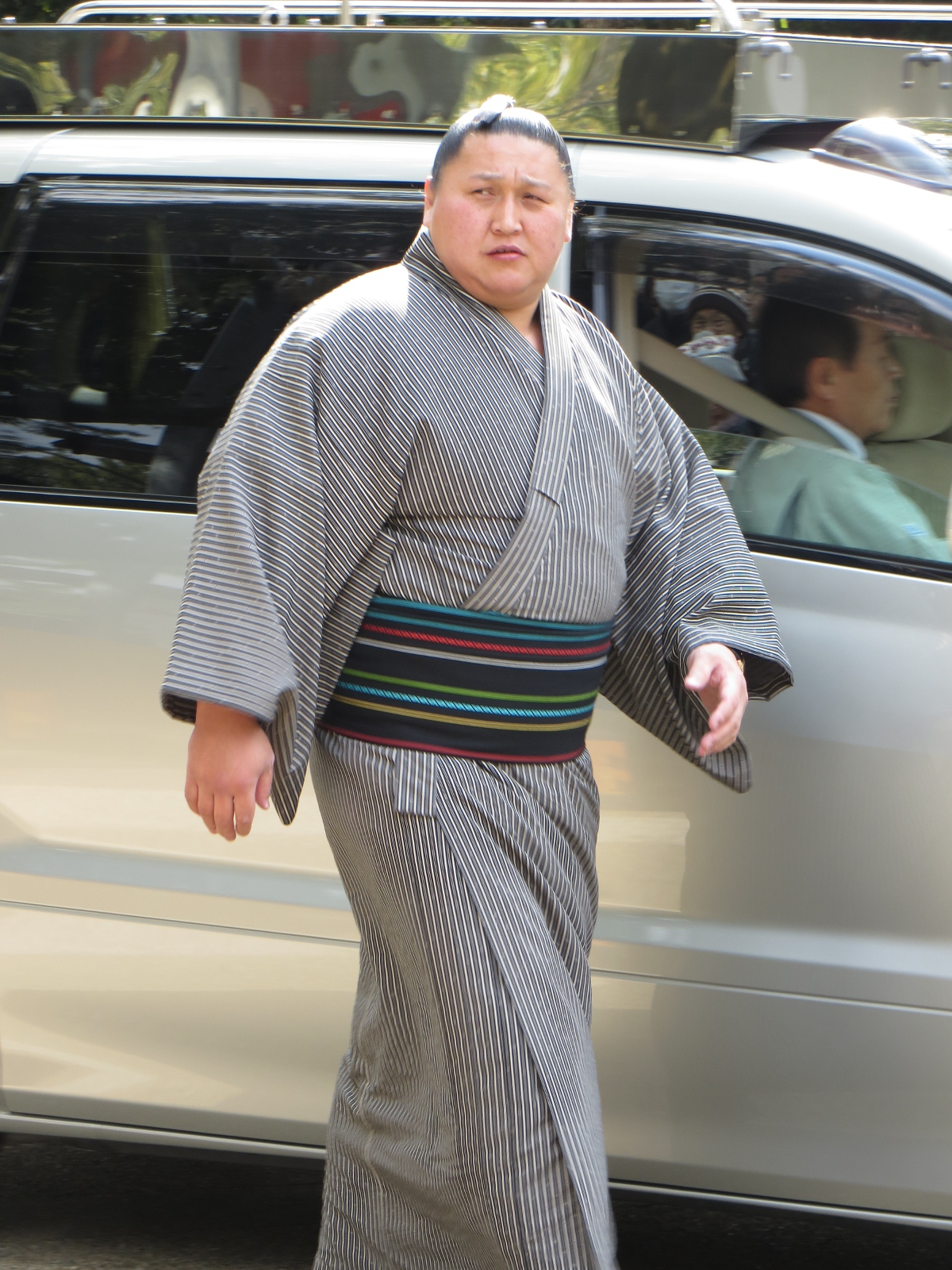
Kyokutenhō

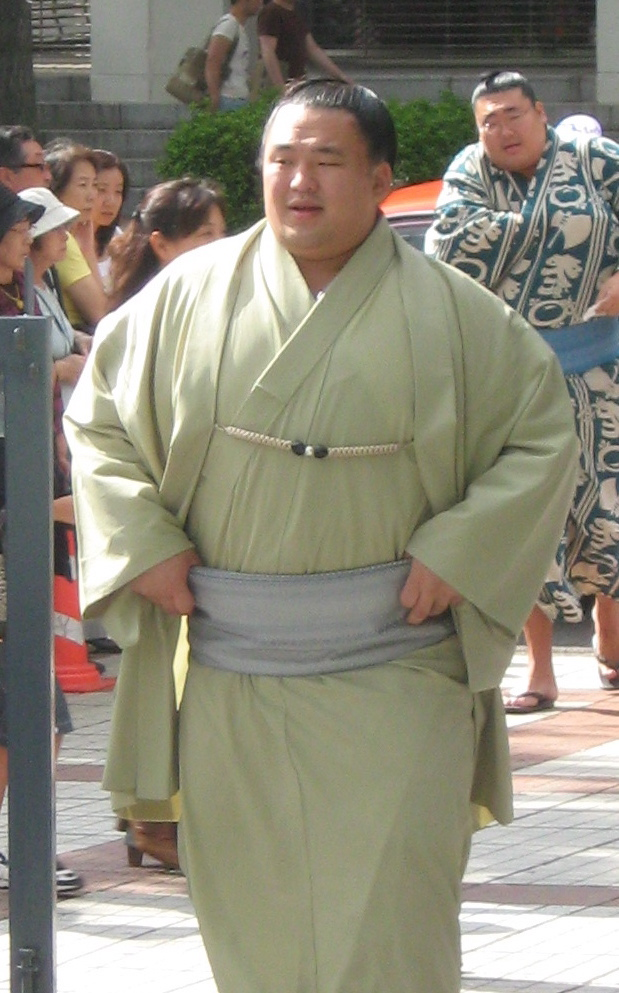
Tamawashi

=== Boxers ===
- Enkhbatyn Badar-Uugan (b. 1985), boxer, gold medal at the 2008 Summer Olympics.
- Velikton Barannikov (1938–2007), Buryat boxer, won a silver medal at the 1964 Summer Olympics and a gold medal at the 1965 European Championships.
- Shinny Bayaar (b. 1977), boxer, British Flyweight champion.
- Namjilyn Bayarsaikhan (b. 1965), boxer, bronze medal at the 1992 Summer Olympics.
- Baatarsükhiin Chinzorig (b. 1991), boxer, won a silver medal at the 2018 Asian Games.
- Kharkhüügiin Enkh-Amar (b. 1992), won a gold medal at the 2013 Summer Universiade and a bronze medal at the 2019 Asian Championships.
- Nergüin Enkhbat (b. 1962), boxer, bronze medal at the 1988 Summer Olympics.
- Zorigtbaataryn Enkhzorig (b. 1987), boxer, won a gold medal at the 2007 Asian Championships and a silver medal at the 2006 Asian Games.
- Gankhuyagiin Gan-Erdene (b. 1993), boxer, won a bronze medal at the 2015 Asian Championships and a silver medal at the 2017 Asian Championships.
- Uranchimegiin Mönkh-Erdene (b. 1982), boxer, bronze medal at the 2012 Summer Olympics.
- Tugstsogt Nyambayar (b. 1992), professional boxer, 2010 World University Champion, silver medal at the 2012 Summer Olympics, and IBO featherweight world champion.
- Dorjnyambuugiin Otgondalai (b. 1988), boxer, gold medal at the 2014 Asian Games, gold medal at the 2015 Asian Championships, and bronze medal at the 2016 Summer Olympics.
- Pürevdorjiin Serdamba (b. 1985), boxer, 2009 World Champion, silver medal at the 2008 Summer Olympics.
- Lakva Sim (b. 1972), professional boxer, WBA Super Featherweight Champion and WBA Lightweight Champion.
- Erdenebatyn Tsendbaatar (b. 1996), boxer, gold medal at the 2018 Asian Games and at the 2019 Asian Amateur Boxing Championships, bronze medal at the 2019 World Boxing Championships.
- Kostya Tszyu (b. 1968), boxer of paternal Mongolian descent, who is considered one of the greatest Australian boxers in history, as well as one of the hardest-punching light-welterweights in the division's history.
- Tim Tszyu (b. 1994), professional boxer, the son of Kostya Tszyu.
- Choi Tseveenpurev (b. 1971), boxer, Prizefighter Series Featherweight Tournament champion.
- Byambyn Tüvshinbat (b. 1987), won a silver and several bronze medals at the Asian Championships.
- Zhang Xiaoping (b. 1982), boxer, gold medal at the 2008 Summer Olympics.
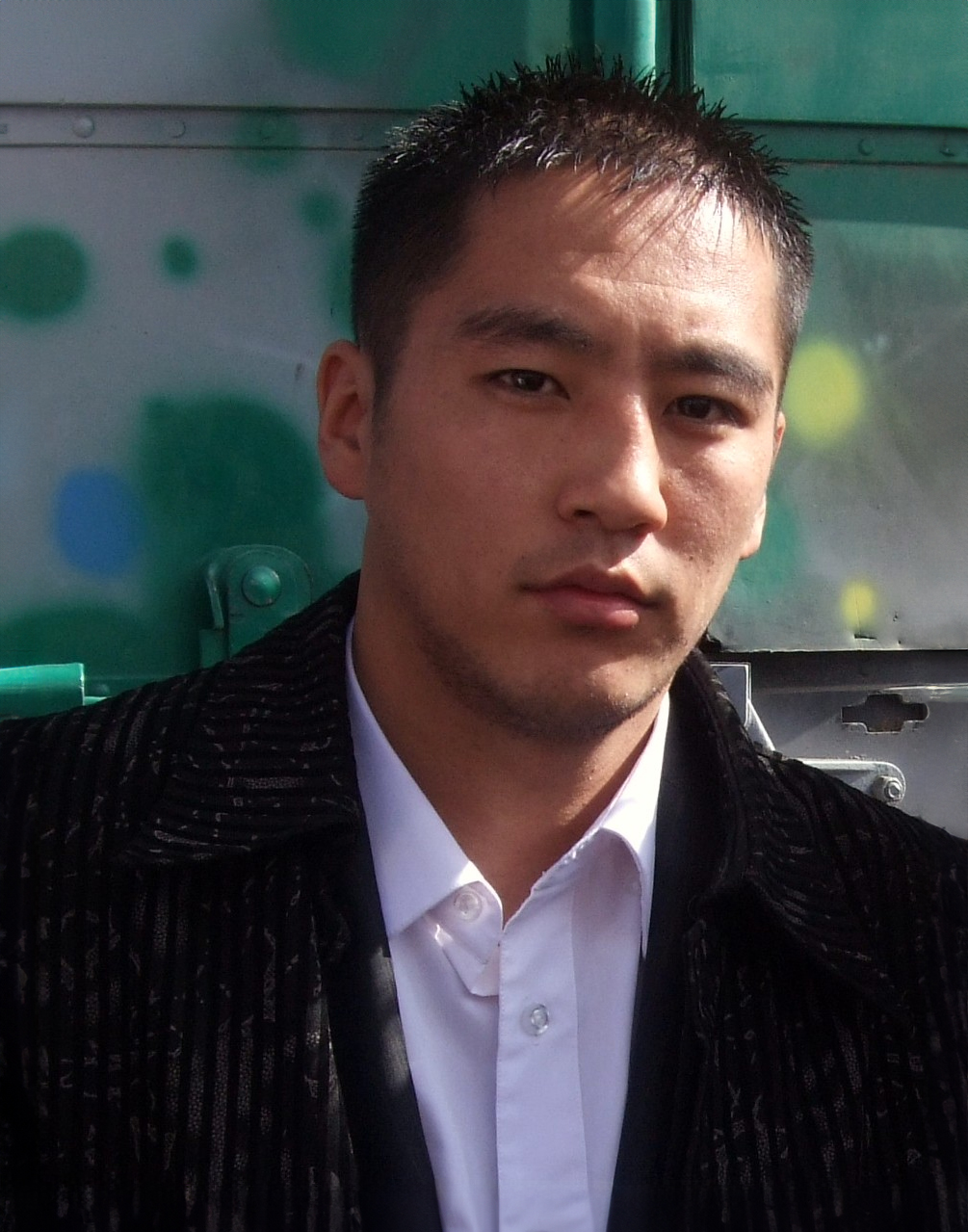
Badar-Uugan

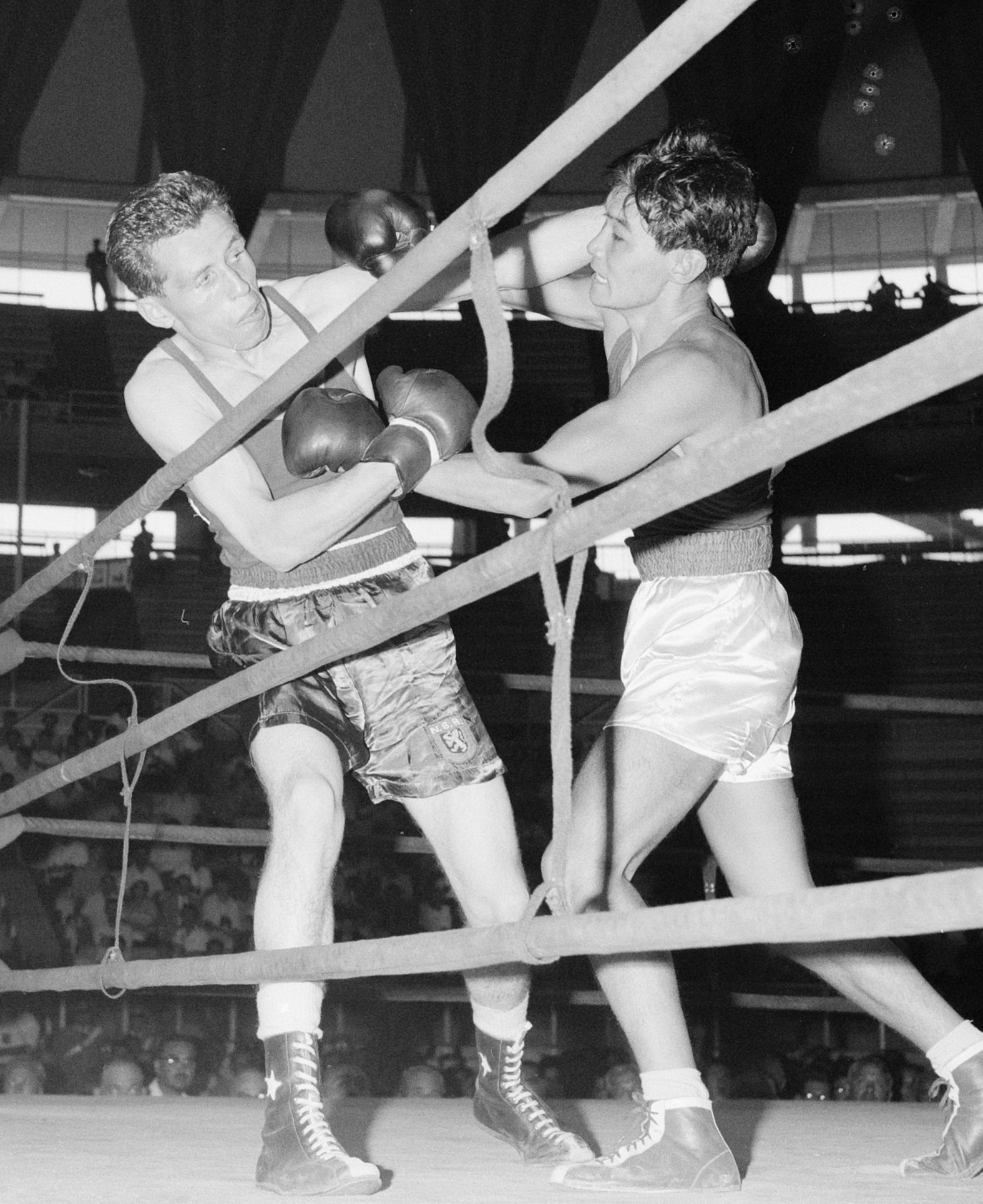
Barannikov

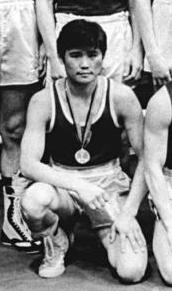
Enkhbat

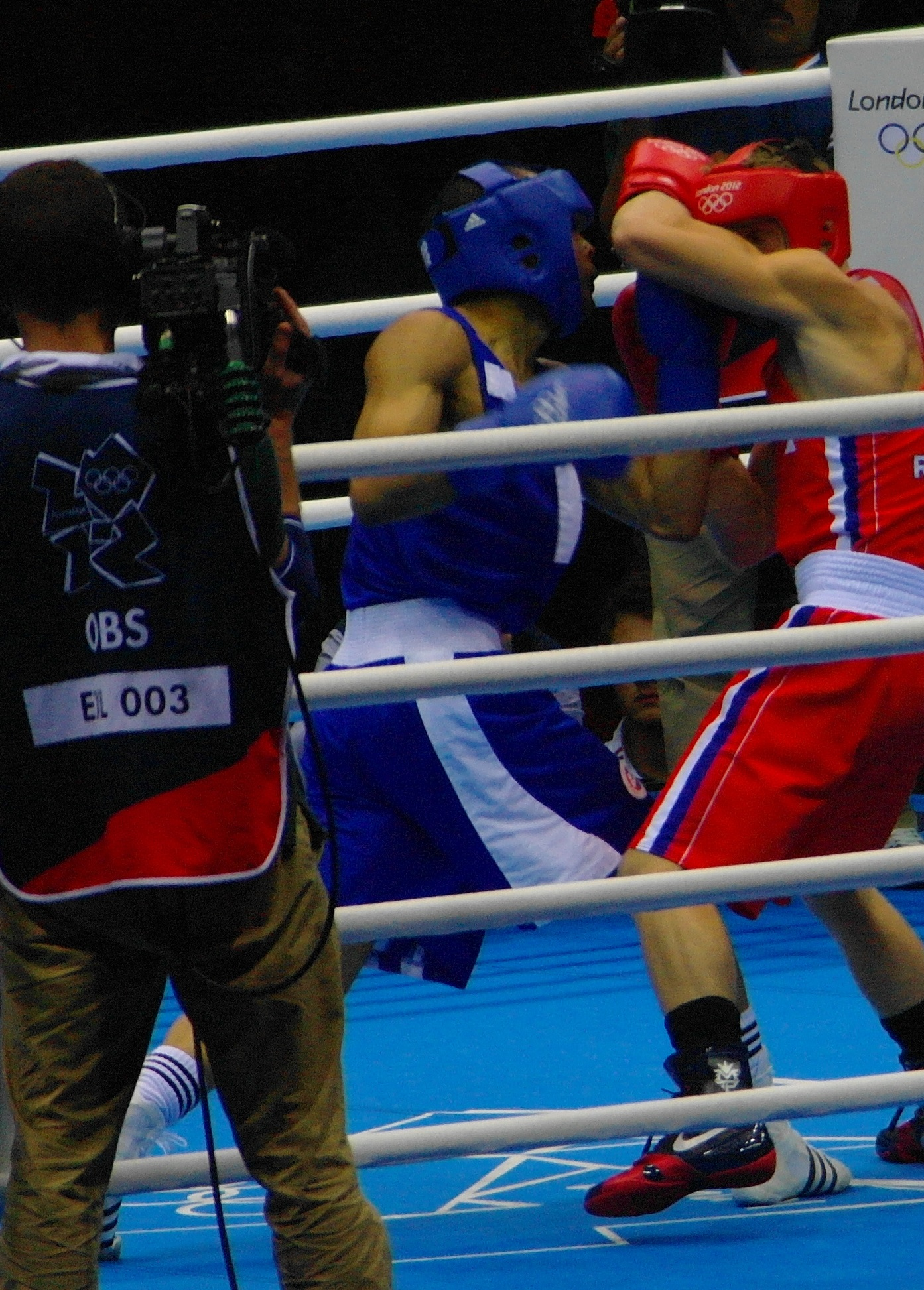
Mönkh-Erdene

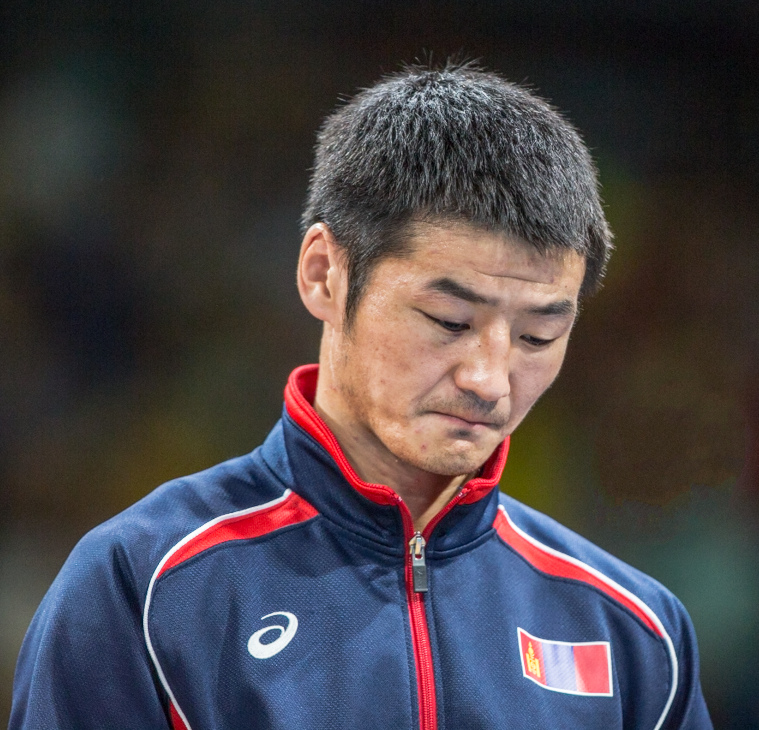
Otgondalai

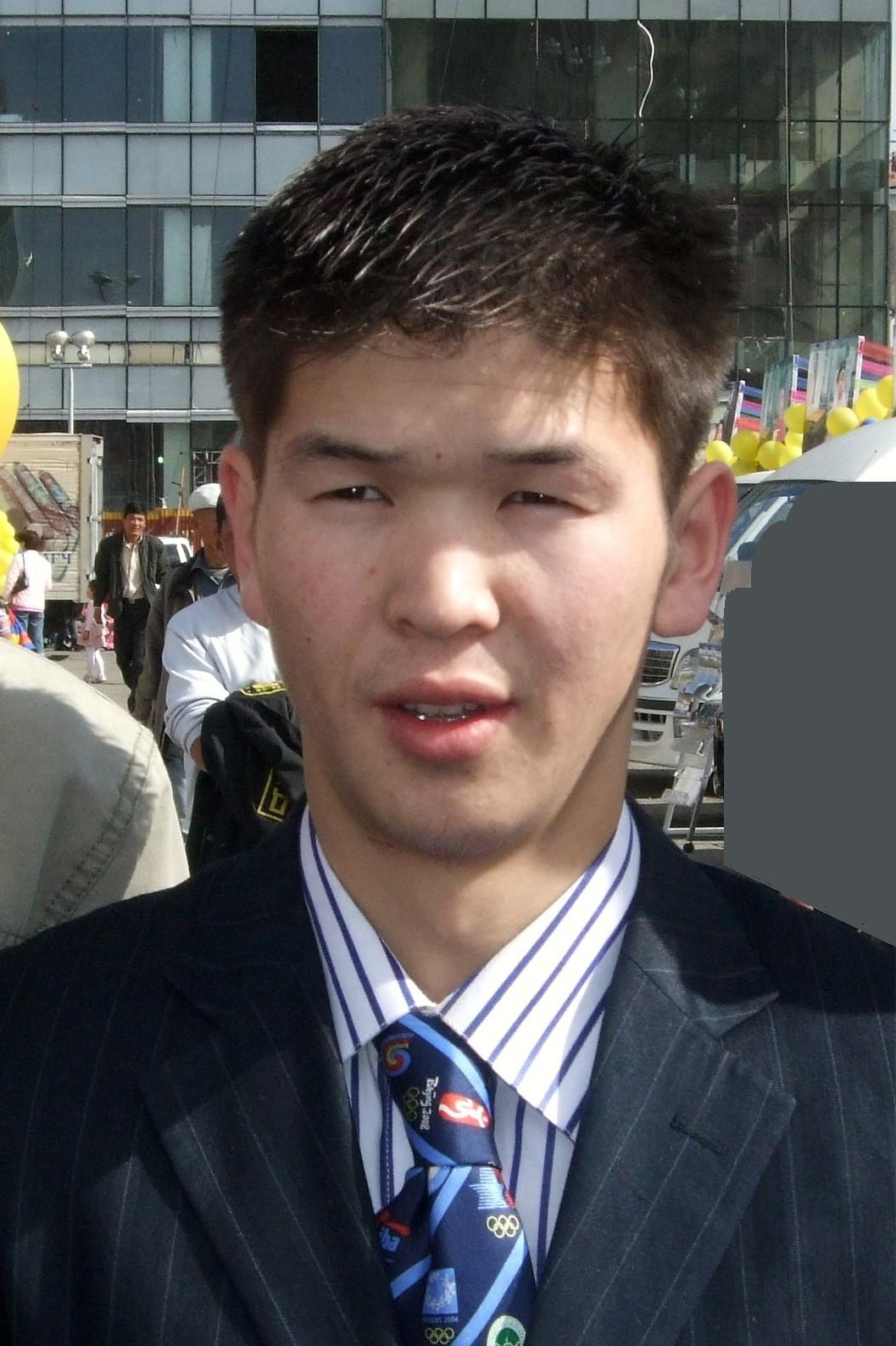
Serdamba

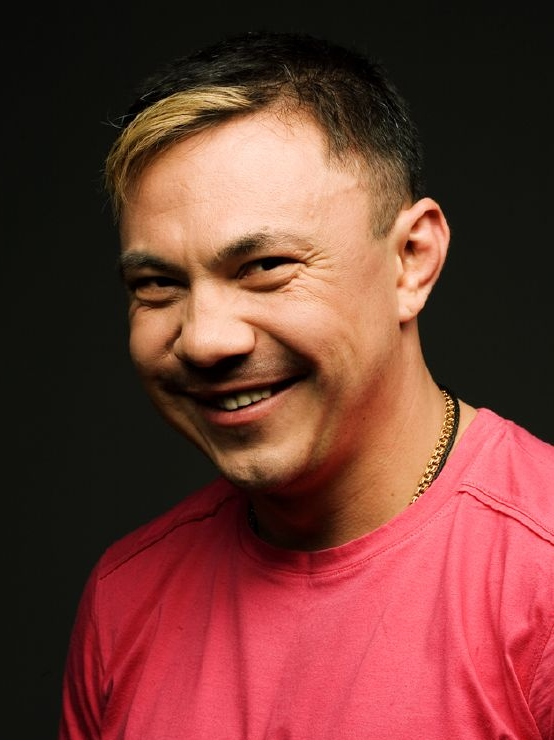
Tszyu

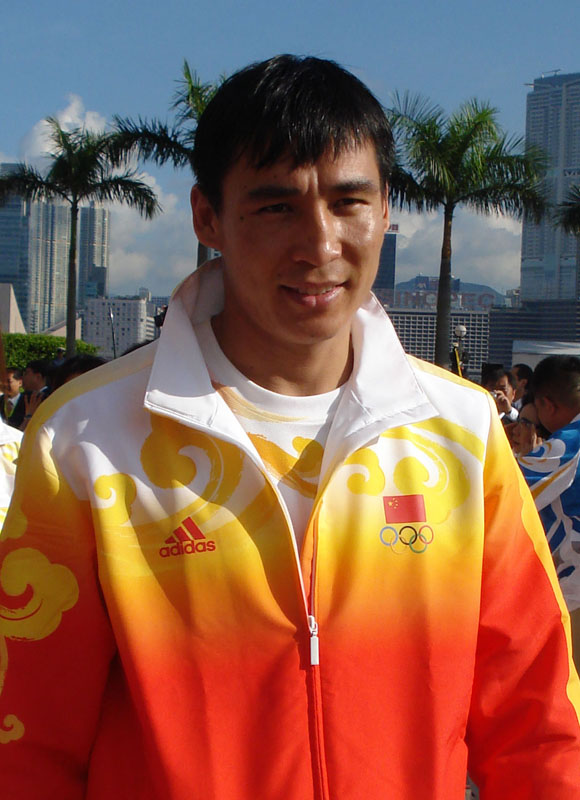
Xiaoping

=== Judoka ===
- Gantulgyn Altanbagana (b. 1995), judoka, won a silver medal at the 2018 Asian Games and a gold medal at the 2017 IJF Grand Prix.
- Dashdavaagiin Amartüvshin (b. 1987), won a silver medal at the 2013 World Judo Championships, and many gold medals at the IJF Grand Slam and Grand Prix.
- Enkhtaivany Ariunbold (b. 1995), judoka, won a silver medal at the 2022 World Judo Championships and two bronze medals at the 2019 Asian Championships.
- Bat-Erdene (b. 1964), judoka and wrestler, won a silver medal and a bronze medal at the 1990 Asian Games, and two bronze medals at the 1994 Asian Games.
- Tümen-Odyn Battögs (b. 1981), won several medals at the Asian Games and the Asian Championships.
- Dashgombyn Battulga (b. 1966), judoka, won a bronze medal at the 1990 Asian Games and a bronze medal at the 1994 Asian Games.
- Ganbatyn Boldbaatar (b. 1987), won a gold medal at the 2014 World Judo Championships, a gold medal at the 2009 Asian Championships and a silver medal at the 2014 Asian Games.
- Khaliuny Boldbaatar (b. 1971), judoka, won a gold medal at the 1998 Asian Games, a gold medal at the 1999 Summer Universiade, and several silver medals at the Asian Judo Championships.
- Mönkhbaataryn Bundmaa (b. 1985), judoka, won the 2007 World Sambo Championships, several gold medals at the IJF Grand Prix and Grand Slam, a gold medal at the 2007 Summer Universiade, two silver medals at the Asian Games and a silver medal at the 2014 World Judo Championships.
- Tsendiin Damdin (b. 1957), judoka, won a silver medal at the 1980 Summer Olympics.
- Gantömöriin Dashdavaa (b. 1981), judoka, bronze medal at the 2002 Asian Games, two silver medals and a bronze medal at the Asian Championships.
- Ravdangiin Davaadalai (b. 1954), judoka, bronze medal at the 1980 Summer Olympics.
- Erdene-Ochiryn Dolgormaa (b. 1977), judoka, won several medals at the Asian Games and the Asian Championships.
- Ölziibayaryn Düürenbayar (b. 1994), judoka, bronze medal at the 2018 World Championships
- Khishigbatyn Erdenet-Od (b. 1975), judoka, won a gold medal at the 1998 Asian Games, two gold medals at the Asian Championships and a bronze medal at the 2005 Judo Championships.
- Pürevjargalyn Lkhamdegd (b. 1986), judoka, won three gold medals at the IJF Grand Prix, two gold medals at the Asian Judo Championships and a bronze medal at the 2006 Asian Games.
- Baldorjyn Möngönchimeg (b. 1994), judoka, won a silver medal (2014) and a bronze medal (2017) at the World Judo Championships, and a silver medal at the 2017 Asian Championships.
- Tsedevsürengiin Mönkhzayaa (b. 1986), judoka, won a gold medal at the Asian Judo Championships and a bronze medal at the 2015 World Championships.
- Tsend-Ayuushiin Naranjargal (b. 1992), judoka, won several medals at the Asian Games and the Asian Championships.
- Dorjpalamyn Narmandakh (b. 1975), judoka, 1996 Asian Champion, bronze medal at the 1996 Summer Olympics.
- Damdinsürengiin Nyamkhüü (b. 1979), judoka, won a gold medal at the 2006 Asian Games, a gold medal at the 2003 Asian Championships and a silver medal at the 2001 Asian Championships.
- Sainjargalyn Nyam-Ochir (b. 1986), judoka, won multiple IJF World Masters and Grand Prix, bronze medal at the 2015 World Championships and bronze medal at the 2012 Summer Olympics.
- Tsend-Ayuushiin Ochirbat (b. 1974), judoka, won a silver medal at the 2002 Asian Games and three bronze medals at the Asian Championships.
- Ganbaataryn Odbayar (b. 1989), judoka, won two bronze medals at the World Championships a silver medal at the 2014 Asian Games, a silver medal at the 2017 Asian Championships and a bronze medal at the 2015 Asian Championships.
- Batjargalyn Odkhüü (b. 1977), judoka, won a bronze medal at the 2003 Asian Championships.
- Lkhagvasürengiin Otgonbaatar (b. 1993), judoka, won two bronze medals at the World Championships (2015, 2018) and two bronze medals at the Asian Games.
- Galbadrakhyn Otgontsetseg (b. 1992), judoka of Mongolian descent who represented Kazakhstan at the 2016 Summer Olympics, winning a bronze medal.
- Wu Shugen (b. 1987), judoka.
- Dorjsürengiin Sumiyaa (b. 1991), judoka, won several gold medals at the World Sambo Championships, the 2016 Asian Judo Championships, the 2017 World Championships and a silver medal at the 2016 Summer Olympics.
- Battulgyn Temüülen (b. 1989), judoka, won a bronze medal at the 2015 World Judo Championships – Men's team, as well as many medals at the IJF Grand Slam and Grand Prix and the Asian Championships.
- Davaadorjiin Tömörkhüleg (b. 1990), judoka, won a gold medal at the 2014 World Sambo Championships, a gold medal at the 2014 Asian Games, a gold medal at the 2013 Asian Championships, and six gold medals between IJF Grand Slams and Grand Prixs.
- Khashbaataryn Tsagaanbaatar (b. 1984), judoka, 2009 World Champion, won a bronze medal at the 2004 Summer Olympics.
- Dorjgotovyn Tserenkhand (b. 1977), judoka, won several medals at the Asian Games and the Asian Championships.
- Tsend-Ochiryn Tsogtbaatar (b. 1996), judoka, won a gold medal at the 2019 Asian Championships, a bronze medal at the 2016 Asian Championships, and a gold medal at the IJF Grand Slam.
- Naidangiin Tüvshinbayar (b. 1984), judoka, 2008 Summer Olympics champion, won a silver medal at the 2012 Summer Olympics.
- Otgonbaataryn Uuganbaatar (b. 1988), judoka, won two bronze medals and a gold medal at the Asian Championships (the gold in 2019) as well as a bronze medal at the 2015 World Championships, a bronze medal at the 2018 Asian Games, and a gold medal at the 2017 IJF Grand Slam.
- Mönkhbatyn Urantsetseg (b. 1990), judoka, 2013 World Champion, won a gold medal at the 2014 Asian Games, and two gold medals at the Asian Championships (2012, 2017).
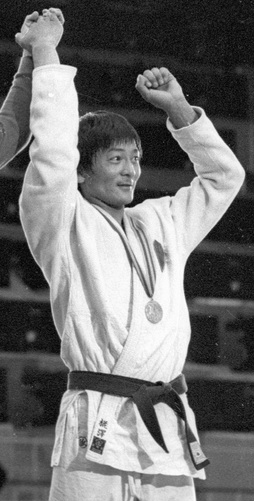
Damdin

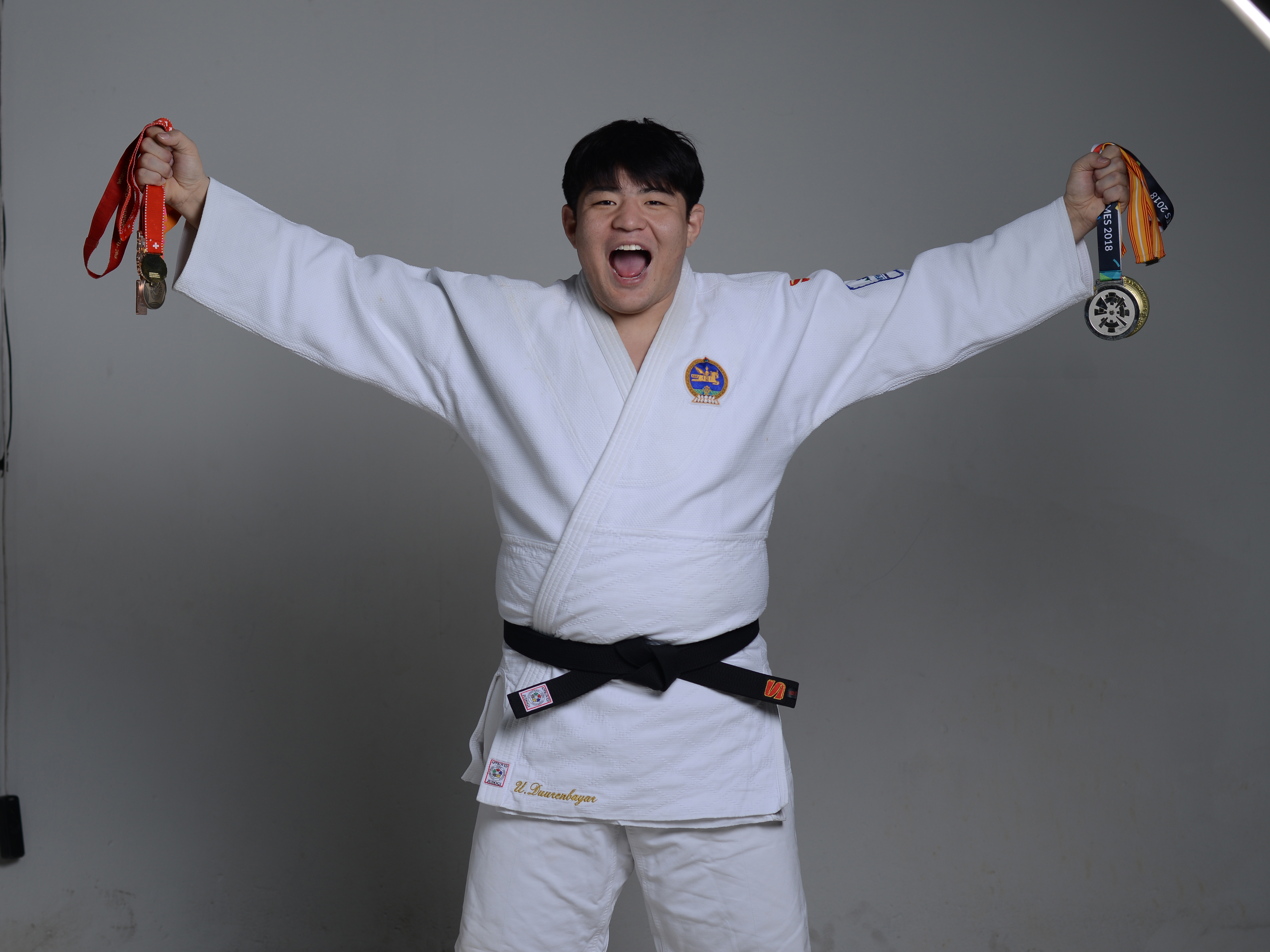
Düürenbayar

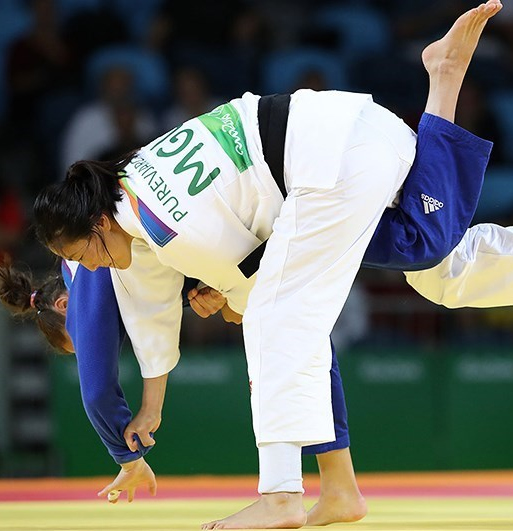
Lkhamdegd

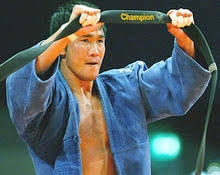
Tsagaanbaatar

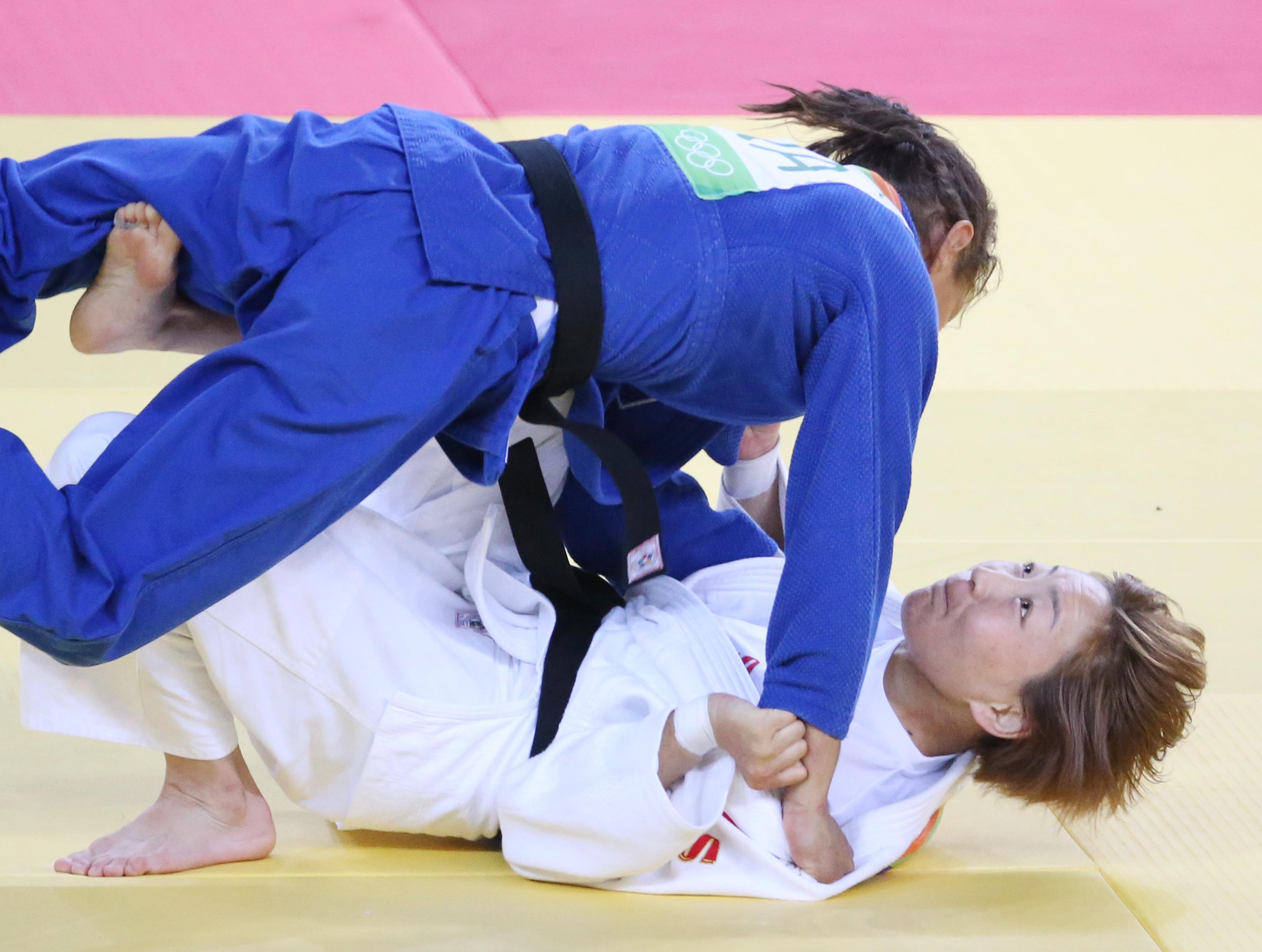
Urantsetseg

=== Other martial artists ===
- Tsogto Amara (b. 1979), kickboxer.
- Danaa Batgerel (b. 1989), UFC fighter, won UFC Vegas 40 Performance of the Night award.
- Batu Khasikov (b. 1980), kickboxer born in Moscow to a Kalmyk father.
- Zhang Lipeng (b. 1990), UFC fighter.
- Jadamba Narantungalag (b. 1975), mixed martial artist.
- Dolgorsürengiin Sumyaabazar (b. 1974), politician and mixed martial artist.
- Zhang Tiequan (b. 1978), UFC fighter.
- Tsogkhüügiin Udval (b. 1994), ju-jitsu practitioner, won a bronze medal at the 2018 Asian Games.
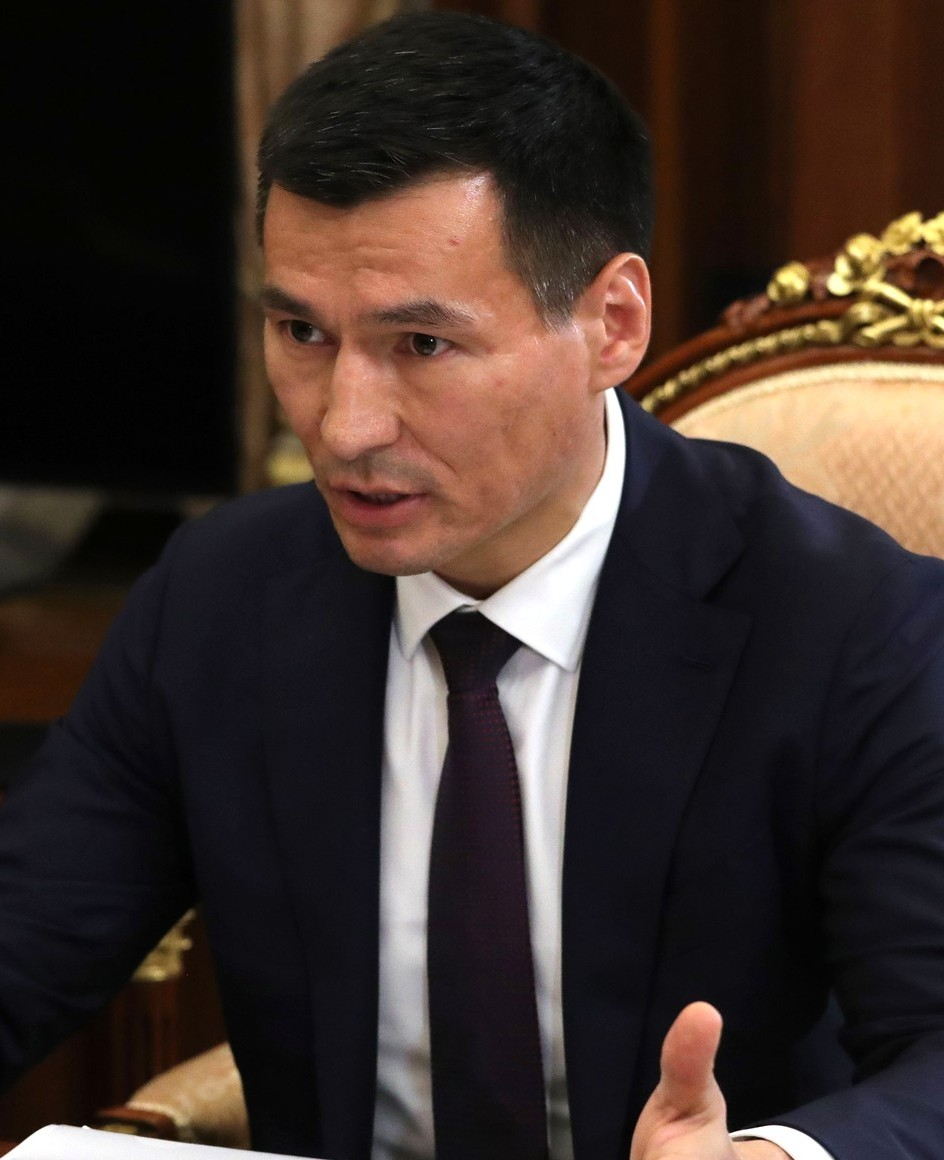
Khasikov

=== Shooters ===
- Sangidorjiin Adilbish (b. 1954), sports-shooter, won a gold medal at the 1982 Asian Games.
- Byambajavyn Altantsetseg (b. 1962), sports-shooter.
- Zorigtyn Batkhuyag (b. 1974), sports-shooter.
- Yondonjamtsyn Batsükh (b. 1945), sports-shooter.
- Nyantain Bayaraa (b. 1991), sports-shooter.
- Enkhtaivany Davaakhüü (b. 1989), sorts-shooter.
- Lkhamjavyn Dekhlee (b. 1937), sports-shooter.
- Dorjsürengiin Mönkhbayar, sports-shooter, won a bronze medal representing Mongolia at the 1992 Summer Olympics, and a bronze medal representing Germany at the 2008 Summer Olympics, as well as the 1998 and 2002 World Championships.
- Zandraa Ganbaatar, sports-shooter.
- Otryadyn Gündegmaa (b. 1978), sports-shooter, won a silver medal at the 2008 Summer Olympics, as well as a bronze medal at 1998 World Championships, another bronze medal at the 2006 World Championships, and a silver medal at the 2014 World Championships.
- Mendbayaryn Jantsankhorloo (b. 1944), sports-shooter, won a gold medal at the 1982 Asian Games.
- Tsogbadrakhyn Mönkhzul (b. 1981), sports-shooter, won a gold medal at the 2007 World Cup, a bronze medal at the 2006 Asian Games, a silver medal at the 2010 Asian Games, and a bronze medal at the 2014 Asian Games.
- Tüdeviin Myagmarjav (b. 1945), sports-shooter.
- Gankhuyag Nandinzaya (b. 1994), sports-shooter, won a gold medal and a bronze medal at the 2018 Asian Games.
- Semyon Nomokonov (1900-1973), sniper of Hamnigan descent active during World War II and credited with 367 kills.
- Tserenjavyn Ölziibayar (b. 1946), sports-shooter.
- Tüvdiin Tserendondov (b. 1934), sports-shooter.
- Lkhagvaagiin Undralbat (b. 1965), sports-shooter.
- Oyuunbatyn Yesügen (b. 1999), sports-shooter.
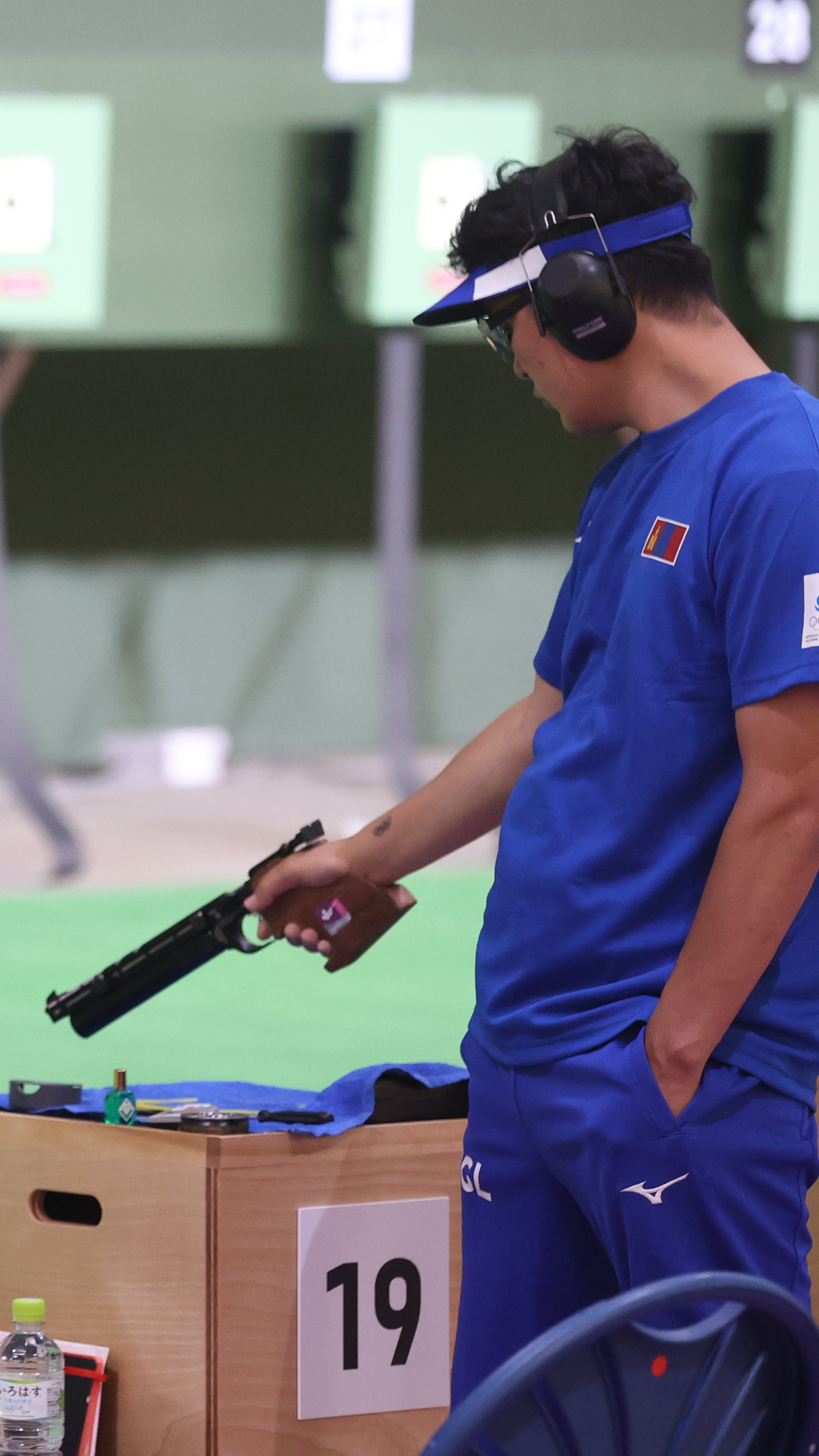
Davaakhüü

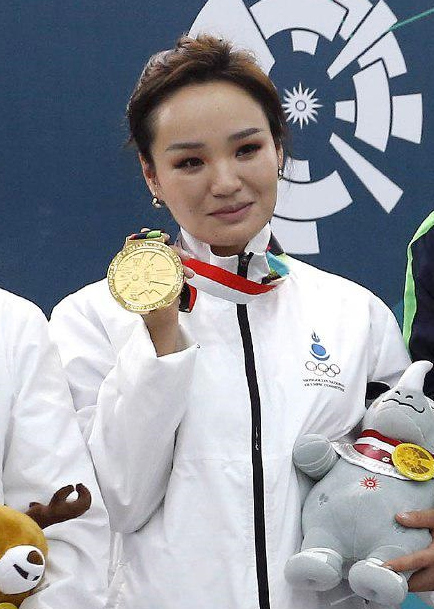
Nandinzaya

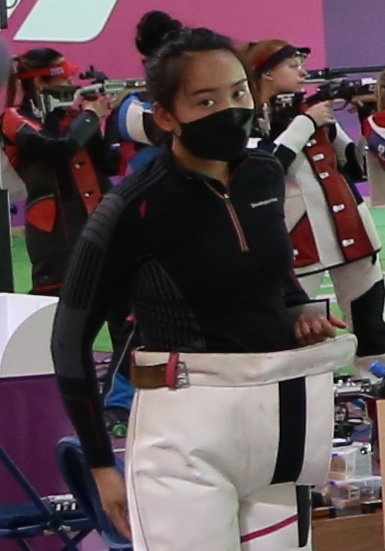
Yesügen

=== Archers ===
- Ayusi (18th century), Dzungar officer of the Qing dynasty.
- Dambadondogiin Baatarjav (b. 1961), archer, won a gold medal at the 2008 Summer Paralympics.
- Bair Badënov (b. 1976), Buryat archer, won a bronze medal at the 2008 Summer Olympics and a gold medal (1996) and silver medal (2008) at the European Championships.
- Chagdaryne Biambasuren (b. 1953), archer, finished 23rd at the individual archery event at the 1980 Summer Olympics.
- Natalia Bolotova (b. 1963), Buryat archer, won a silver medal at the 1993 World Archery Championships and a silver medal at the 1990 European Archery Championships.
- Alexander Dambaev (b. 1989), Buryat archer, won two gold medals at the Universiade (2011, 2017), a silver medal at the 2013 World Archery Championships and a bronze medal at the 2013 World Archery Championships.
- Natjav Dariimaa (b. 1950), archer, finished 14th at the individual archery event at the 1972 Summer Olympics and 22nd at the 1976 Summer Olympics.
- Tuyana Dashidorzhieva (b. 1996), Buryat archer, won a silver medal at the 2016 Summer Olympics, a silver medal at the 2015 World Championships, and two bronze medals at the Universiade.
- Natalia Erdyniyeva (b. 1988), Buryat archer, won a bronze medal at the 2007 World Championships.
- Jantsangiin Gantögs (b. 1972), archer, finished 19th at the individual archery event at the 2012 Summer Olympics.
- Inna Stepanova (b. 1990), Buryat archer, won a silver medal at the 2016 Summer Olympics and a gold medal at the 2015 World Archery Championships.
- Balzhinima Tsyrempilov (b. 1975), archer, won a gold medal at the 2007 Archery World Cup, a silver medal at the 2007 World Championships, a bronze medal at the 1997 World Championships, and four gold medals at the European Archery Championships.
- Bishindeegiin Urantungalag (b. 1977), archer, finished 18th at the individual archery event at the 2012 Summer Olympics.
- Vladimir Yesheyev (b. 1958), Buryat archer, won a bronze medal at the 1988 Summer Olympics.
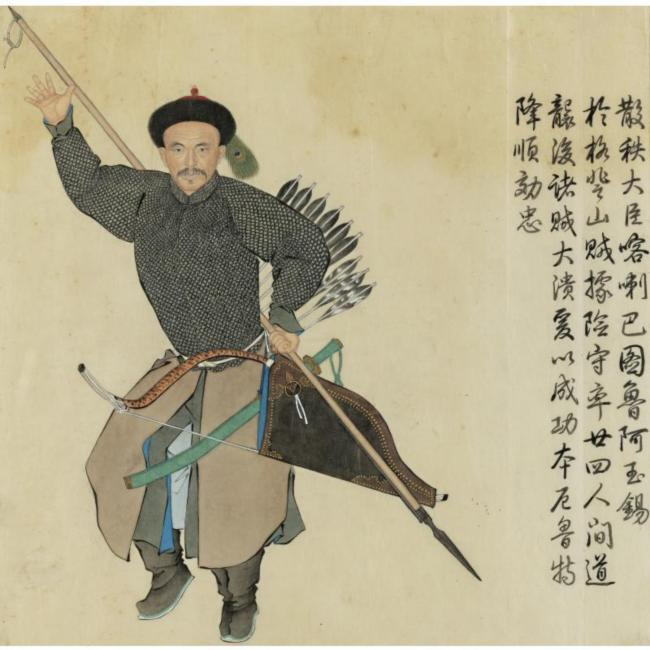
Ayusi

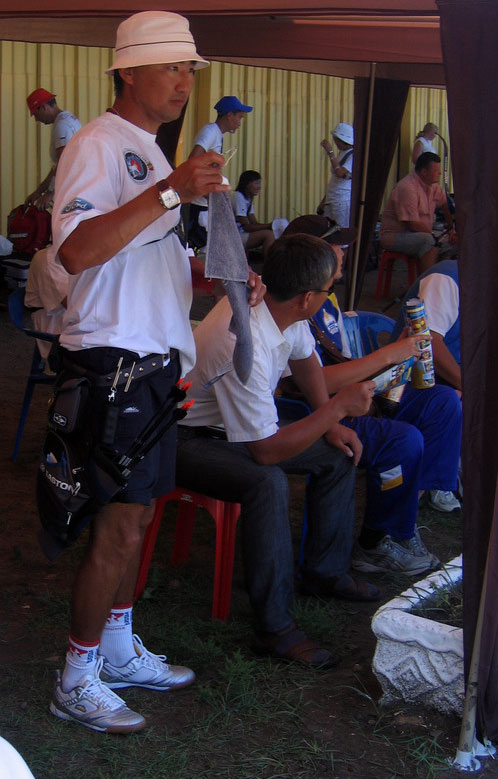
Badënov

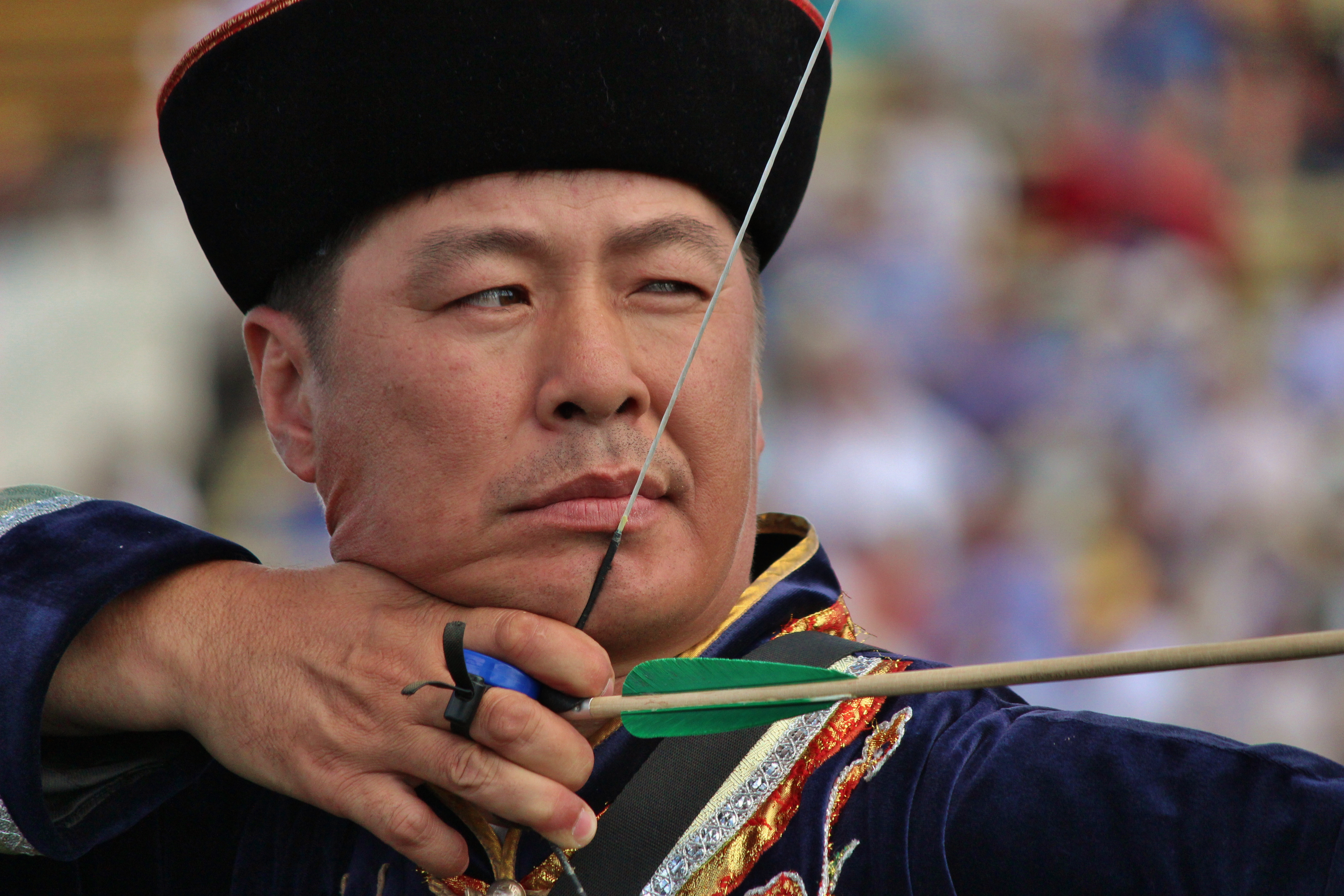
Tsyrempilov

=== Chess players ===
- Tsegmediin Batchuluun (b. 1987), chess player, Grandmaster (GM).
- Dambasürengiin Batsüren (b. 2004), chess player, Grandmaster, International Master, FIDE Master.
- Tsagaan Battsetseg (b. 1972), chess player, Woman International Master.
- Sumiya Bilguun (b. 1997), chess player, Grandmaster.
- Sugar Gan-Erdene (b. 2003), chess player, International master, ranked 16th U18 player in Asia.
- Sandagdorj Handsuren (b. 1940), chess player, Woman International Master.
- Ganginchugin Hulgana (b. 1929), chess player, Woman FIDE Master.
- Kirsan Ilyumzhinov (b. 1962), Russian politician of Kalmyk descent, former President of the World Chess Federation.
- Jambaldoo Lhagva (b. 1944), chess player, FIDE Master, International Arbiter.
- Batkhuyagiin Möngöntuul (b. 1987), chess player, International Master and Woman Grandmaster.
- Törmönkhiin Mönkhzul (b. 2002), chess player, Woman International Master.
- Bat-Erdene Mungunzul (b. 2005), chess player, won a gold medal at the 44th Chess Olympiad.
- Lhamsuren Myagmarsuren (b. 1938), chess master, International Master (IM).
- Nomin-Erdene Davaademberel (b. 2000), chess player, currently holding Grandmaster (GM) norms.
- Sanan Sjugirov (b. 1993), chess grandmaster, born in Elista and of Kalmyk descent.
- Batchimeg Tuvshintugs (b. 1986), chess player, International Master (IM) and Woman Grandmaster (WGM).
- Tüdeviin Üitümen (1939–1993), chess master, International Master (IM).
- Dinara Wagner (b. 1999), German chess player of Kalmyk descent, Woman Grandmaster.
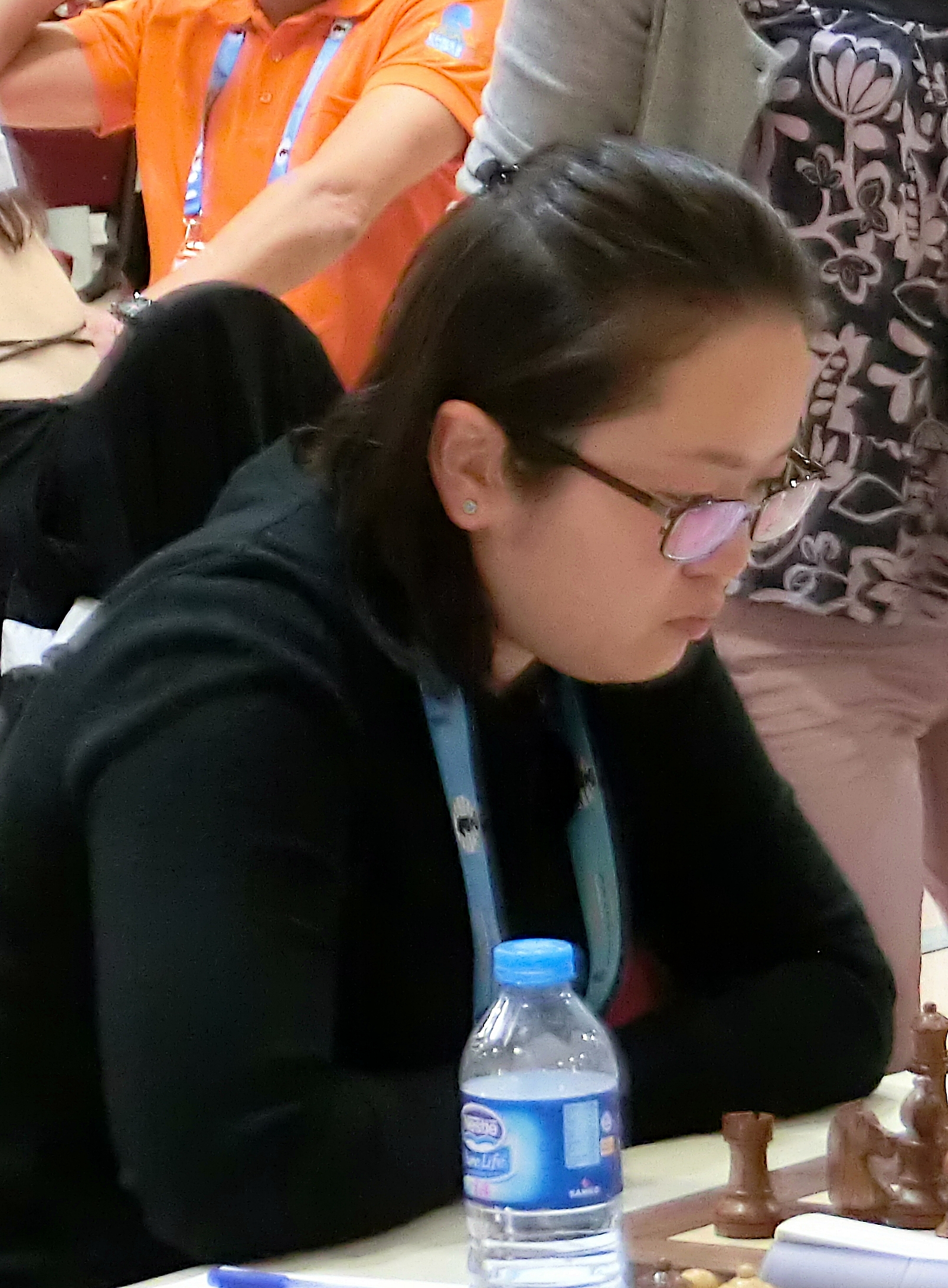
Batkhuyagiin

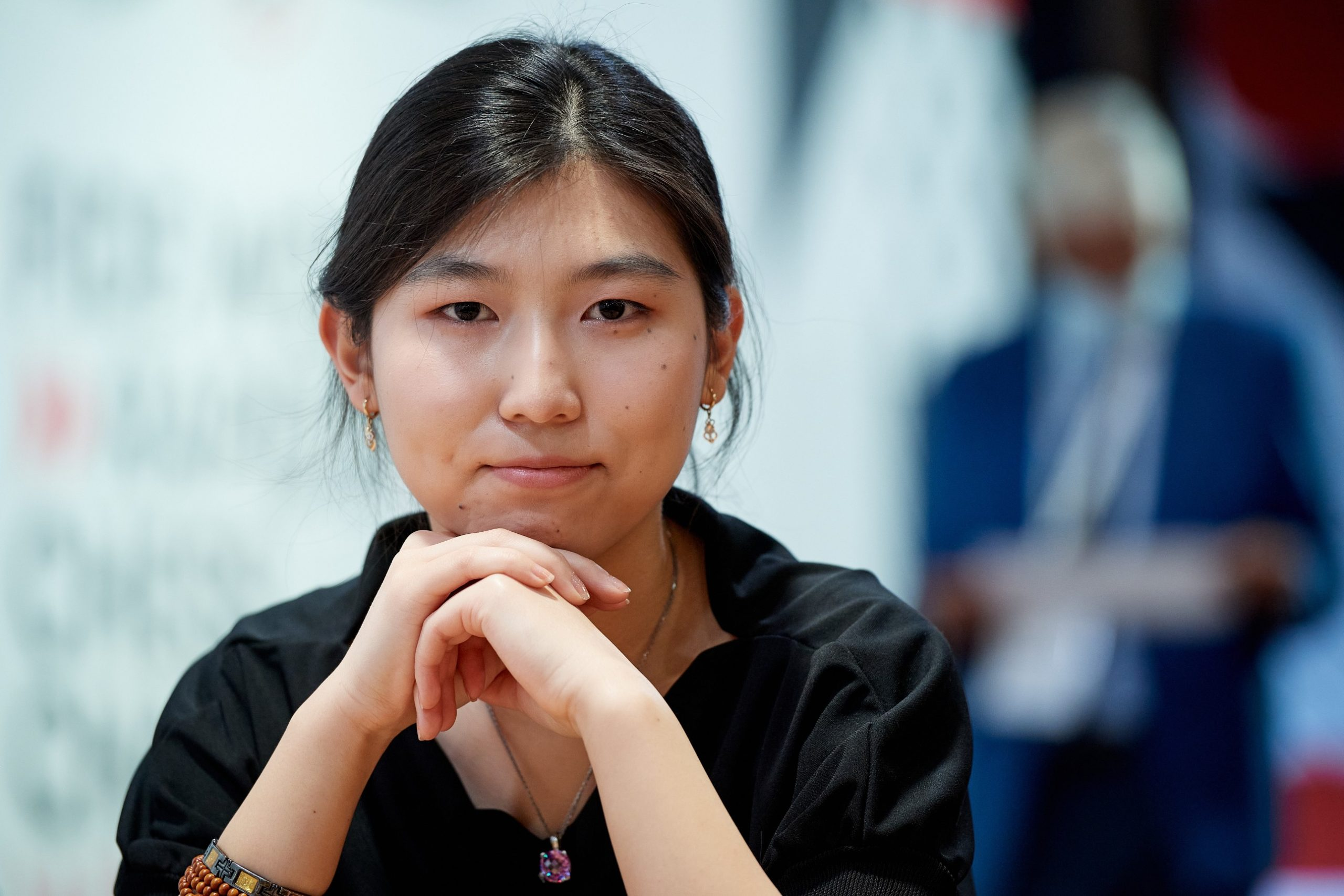
Davaademberel

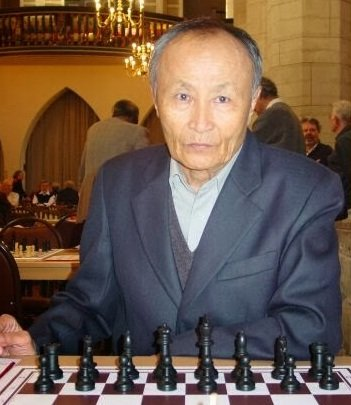
Lhamsuren

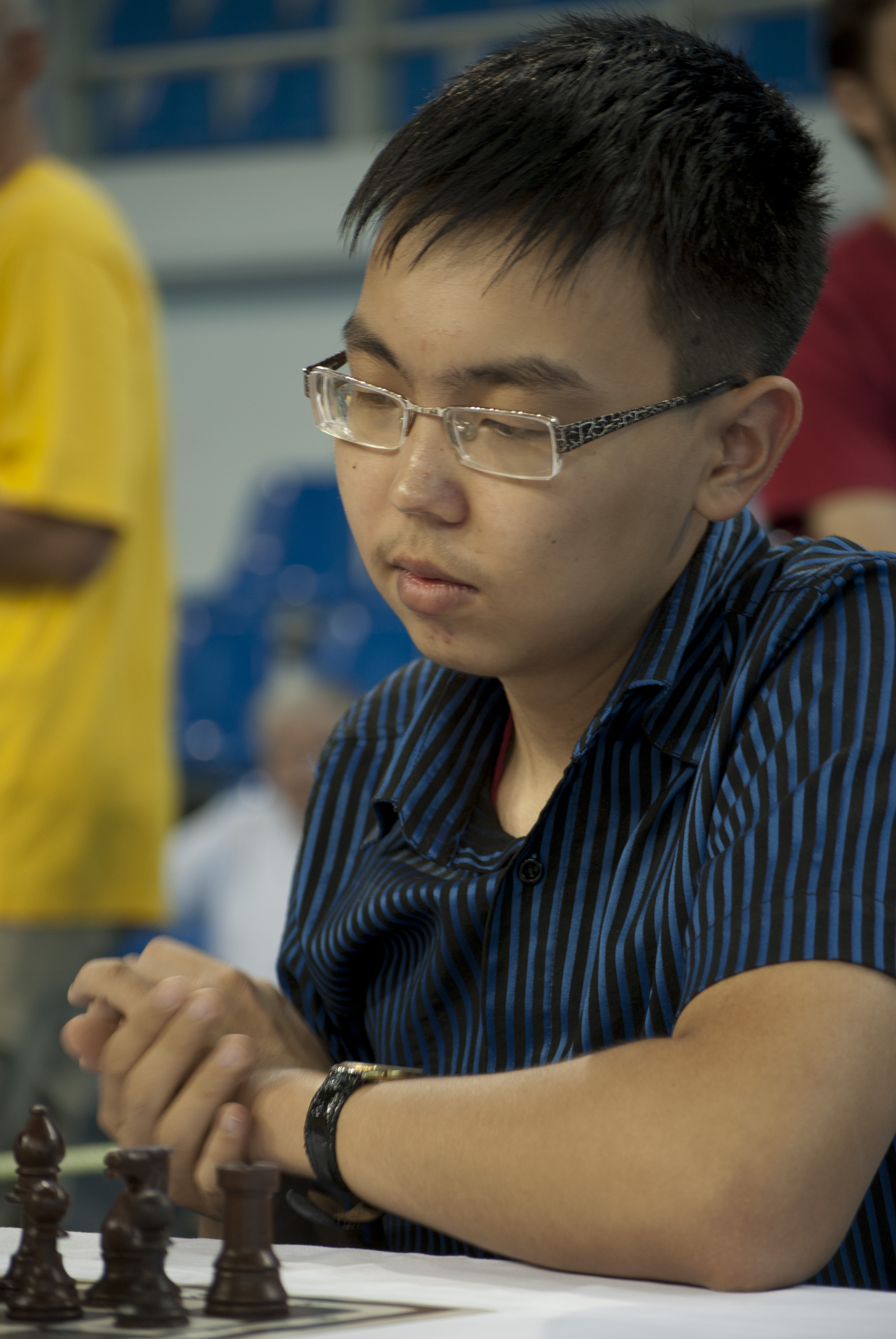
Sjugirov

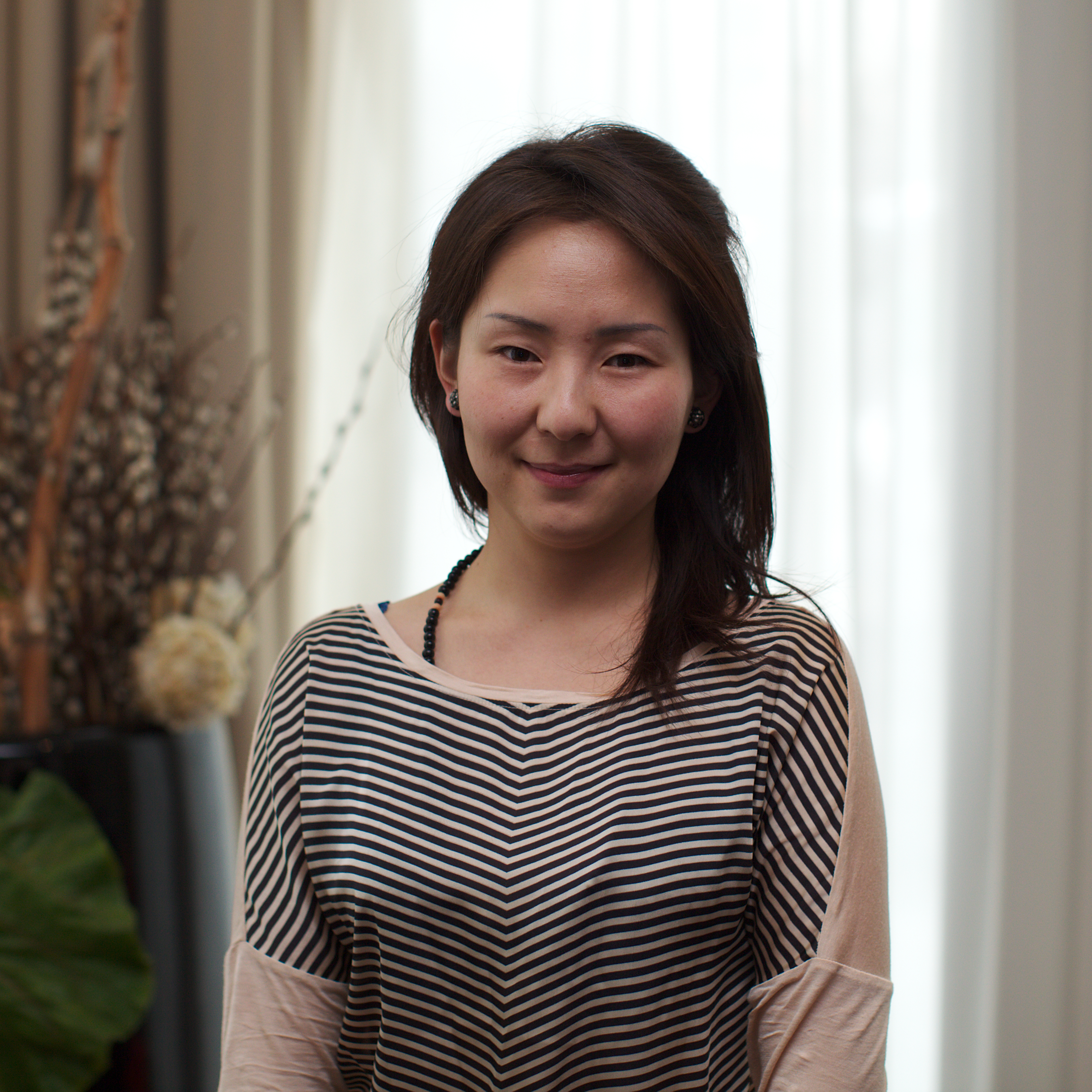
Tuvshintugs

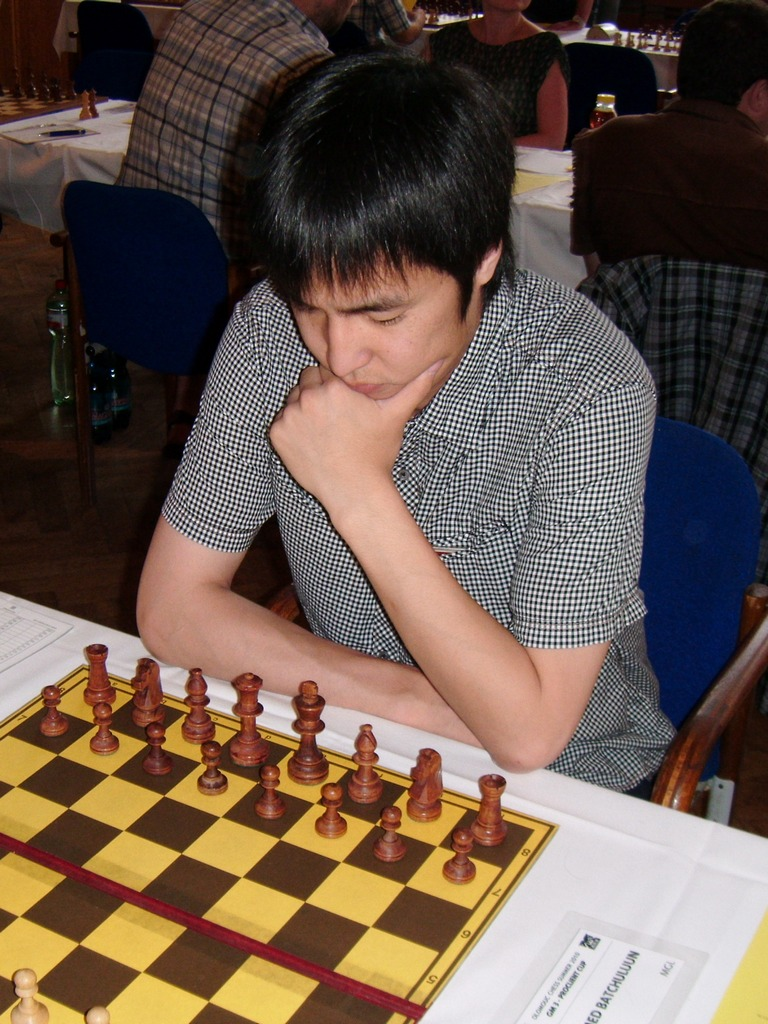
Tsegmed

=== Other ===
- Bateer (b. 1975), former basketball player who played in the NBA for Denver, San Antonio, and the Raptors, one of the only six players of Chinese nationality to play in the NBA.
- Lyudmila Bodniyeva (b. 1978), handball player of Kalmyk descent, 2001 and 2005 World Champion.
- Jean Djorkaeff (b. 1939), soccer player of Kalmyk descent, defender of Lyon, Marseille, and France.
- Youri Djorkaeff (b.1968), soccer player who played as an attacking midfielder for Monaco, PSG, Inter, and France, notably winning the 1998 World Cup and the UEFA Cup. He was the 1993–94 Ligue 1 top scorer and was included in FIFA XI in 1997.
- Sodnompiljee Enkhbayar, powerlifter, won a bronze medal at the 2016 Summer Paralympics.
- Baatsuri Enkhbaatar (b. 1985), footballer.
- Tüvshinjargalyn Enkhjargal (b. 1992), cyclist.
- Ganbatyn Erdenebold (b. 1993), gymnast, gold medal at the 2010 Summer Youth Olympics.
- Bayaraagiin Gerelt-Od, ski-orienteer, won three bronze medals at the 2011 Asian Winter Games.
- Sandje Ivanchukov (1960–2007), soccer player, former defender of the Tampa Bay Rowdies.
- Dashdendev Makhashiri (b. 1969), discus thrower.
- Menggenjimisu (b. 1991), paralympian athlete, gold medal in Discus Throw at the 2008 Summer Olympics.
- Suurisürengiin Mönkhbaatar (b. 1976), international footballer
- Tungalagiin Sanchir (b. 1989), basketball player.
- Bat-Ochiryn Ser-Od (b. 1981), marathon runner.
- Lu Wen, basketball player, silver at the 2015 FIBA Asia Women's Championship, bronze at the 2013 and 2017 FIBA Women's Asia Cup.
- Yanjaa, Mongolian-Swedish triple world-record holding memory athlete, public speaker, and polyglot. First woman in history to place at the world event together with fellow countryman Munkhshur Narmandakh.
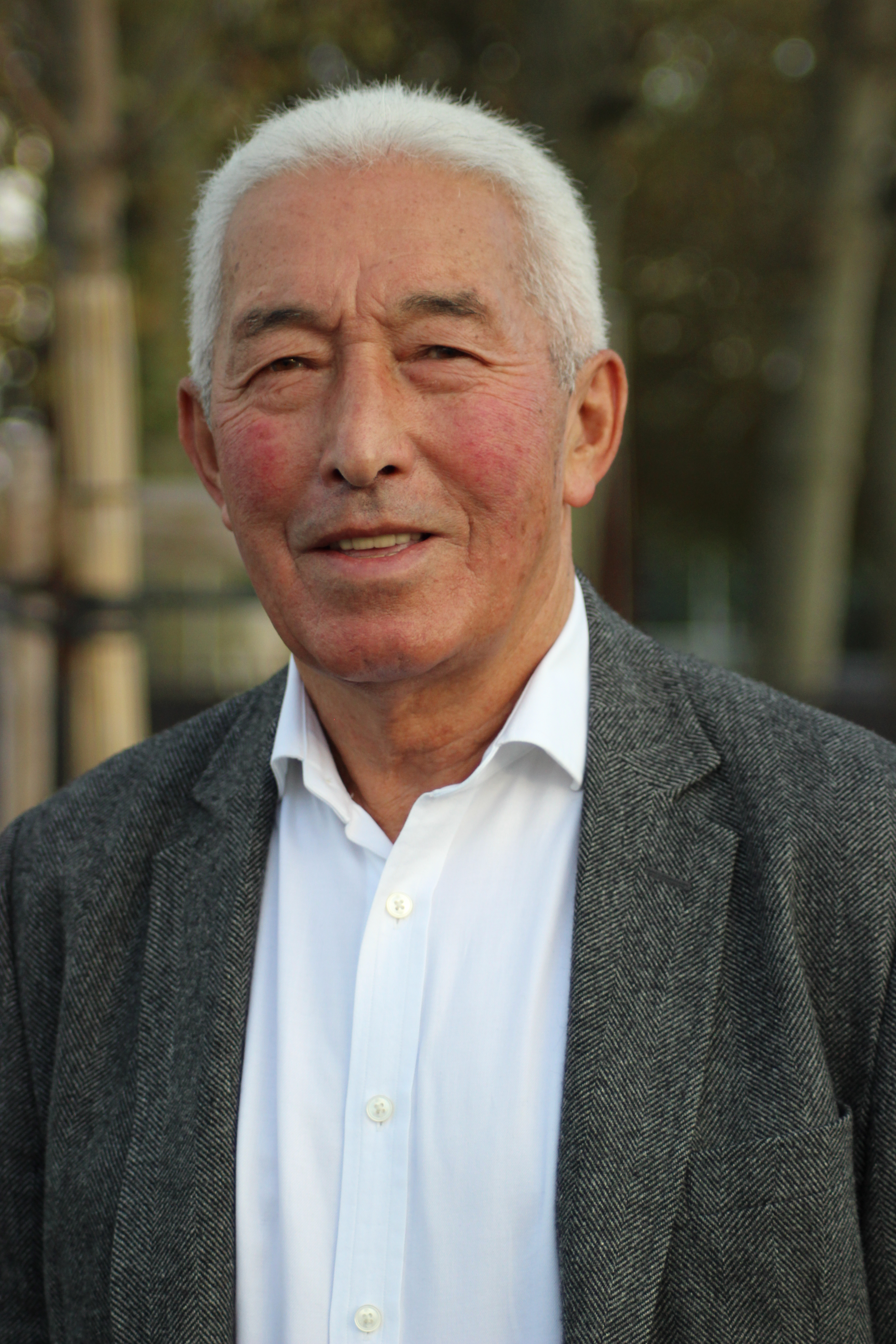
J. Djorkaeff

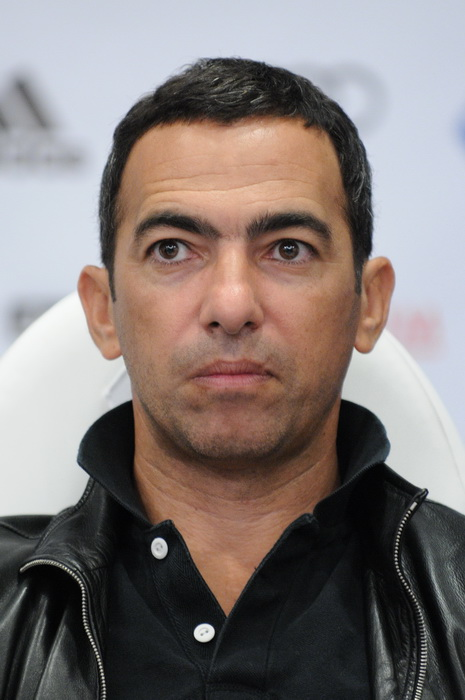
Y. Djorkaeff

== Science and humanities ==
- Bayarjargal Agvaantseren (born 1969), environmentalist.
- Antong (1248–1293), Confucian scholar, official and administrator.
- Rinchen Barsbold (b. 1935), palaeontologist and geologist.
- Nadmidyn Bayartsaikhan (b. 1962), social scientist.
- Dashiin Byambasüren (b. 1942), economist.
- Chinggeltei (1924–2013), linguist, author of Study of the Lesser Khitan Script , a significant milestone in the study of the Khitan language and its writing system.
- Chosgi Odsir (1260–1320), scholar, translator and writer.
- Yelü Chucai (1190–1244), Khitan statesman from the imperial clan of the Liao dynasty who became a vigorous adviser and administrator of the early Mongol Empire in the Confucian tradition.
- Tsendiin Damdinsüren (1908–1986), writer and linguist.
- Tumen Dashtseveg, anthropologist.
- Yelü Diela (fl.925), Khitan scholar. Invented the Khitan small script.
- Dorjeban (1315–1354), scholar, counselor, politician.
- Mirza Muhammad Haidar Dughlat (1499–1551), historian.
- Sonom Gara (13th century), scholar and translator.
- Wu Guoqing (1936–2019), forensic scientist and police detective.
- Li Jinghong (b. 1967), chemist.
- Li Lin (1923–2003), physicist, daughter of Li Siguang.
- Mingatu (1692–1763), astronomer, mathematician, who discovered the Catalan numbers.
- Bolortsetseg Minjin, paleontologist.
- Yümjiriin Mönkh-Amgalan (b. 1956), linguist.
- Gerel Ochir (b. 1941), geologist.
- Zaya Pandita (1599–1662), scholar and missionary. Invented the Clear Script.
- Altangerel Perle (b. 1945), palaeontologist.
- Rashipungsug (fl. 1774), historian, writer.
- Byambyn Rinchen (1905–1977), scientist in various areas of Mongolian studies.
- Tserenbaltavyn Sarantuyaa (b. 1959), social scientist, lawyer, writer and an expert of Constitutional law.
- Shirab Sengge (fl. early 14th century), scholar, writer and translator.
- Bazaryn Shirendev (1912–2001), historian, academician.
- Yang Shixian (1897–1985), chemist, chancellor of Nankai University.
- Liang Shuming (1893–1988), philosopher, teacher, and leader in the Rural Reconstruction Movement in the late Qing dynasty and early Republican eras of Chinese history.
- Ai Siqi (1910-1966), philosopher and author.
- Li Siguang (1889–1971), ethnic Mongol geologist born in China, the founder of China's geomechanics.
- Jamsrangiin Tseveen (1880–1942), Buryat scholar.
- Ulugh Beg (1394–1449), astronomer and mathematician.
- Ngawang Wangyal (1901–1983), scholar and translator.
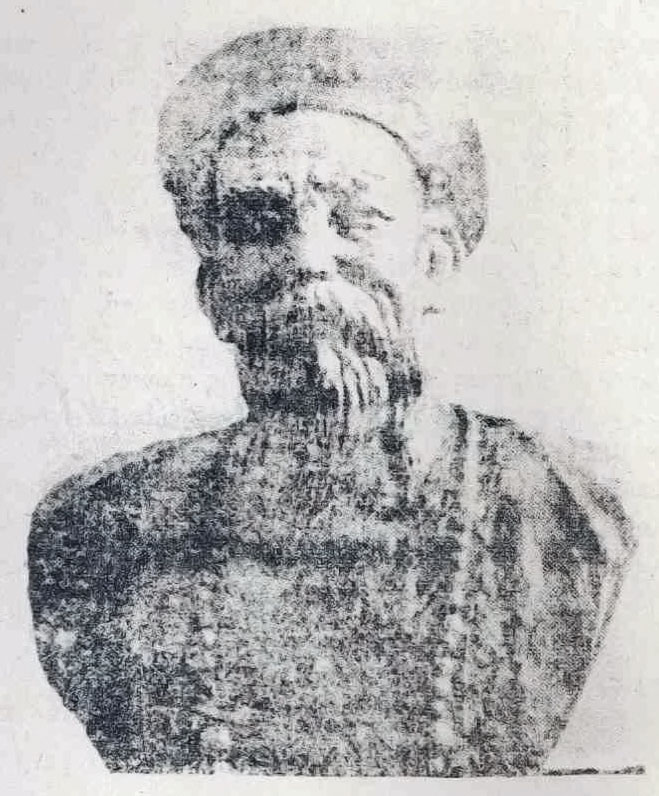
Mingatu

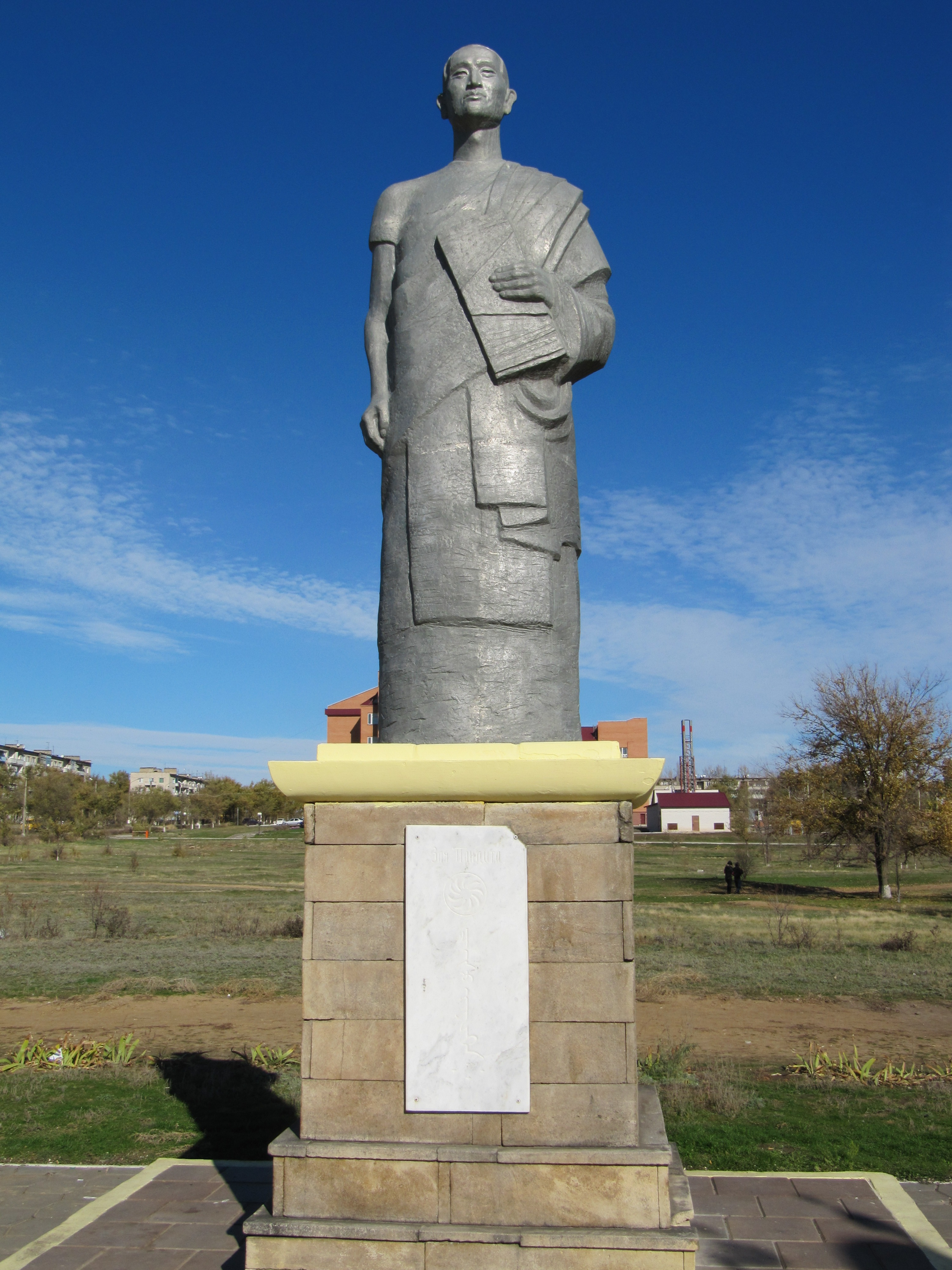
Pandita

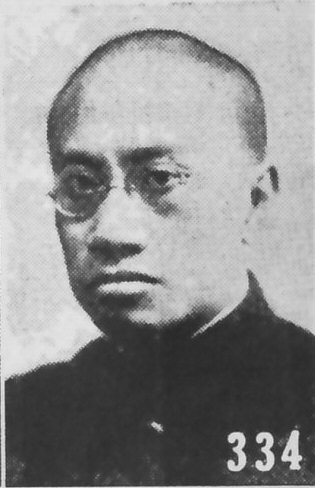
Shuming

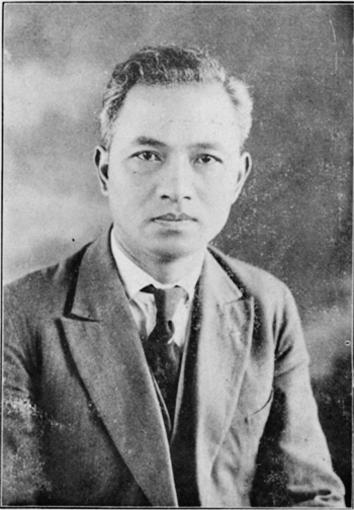
Siguang

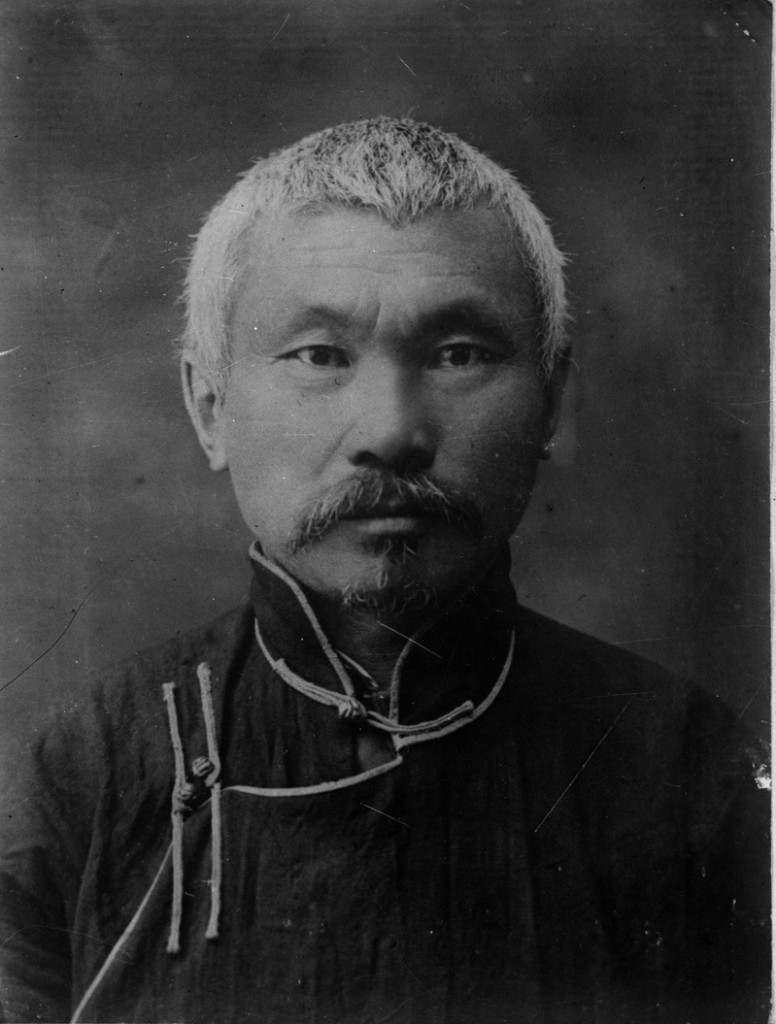
Tseveen

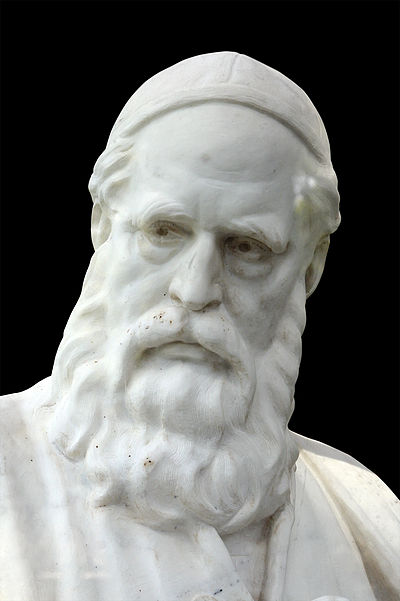
Ulugh Beg

Yelü Chucai

== Musicians ==
=== Classical musicians ===
- Enkhbatyn Amartüvshin (b. 1986), operatic baritone.
- Gaadangiin Altankhuyag (b. 1948), composer and Morin Khuur player.
- Shirnengiin Ayuush (1903–1938), composer.
- Gonchigiin Birvaa (1916–2006), composer.
- Eregzengiin Choidog (1926–1988), composer.
- Jamyangiin Chuluun (1928–1996), composer.
- Bilegiin Damdinsüren (1919–1992), composer.
- Dulduityn Danzanravjaa (1803–1856), writer, composer, painter, physician.
- Agvaantserengiin Enkhtaivan (b. 1958), composer, director.
- Luvsannorovyn Erdenechimeg (b. 1957), composer.
- Ariunbaatar Ganbaatar (b. 1988), baritone.
- Sembiin Gonchigsumlaa (1915–1991), composer.
- Natsagiin Jantsannorov (b. 1948), composer.
- Zunduin Khangal (1948–1996), composer.
- Dagvyn Luvsansharav (1927–2014), composer.
- Luvsanjambyn Mördorj (1919–1996), composer.
- Tsegmidiin Namsraijav (1927–1987), composer.
- Namjilyn Norovbanzad (1931–2002), singer.
- Sangidorjiin Sansargereltekh (b. 1969), composer.
- Byambasuren Sharav (b. 1952), composer.
- Yan Huizhu (1919–1966), classical Chinese opera singer.
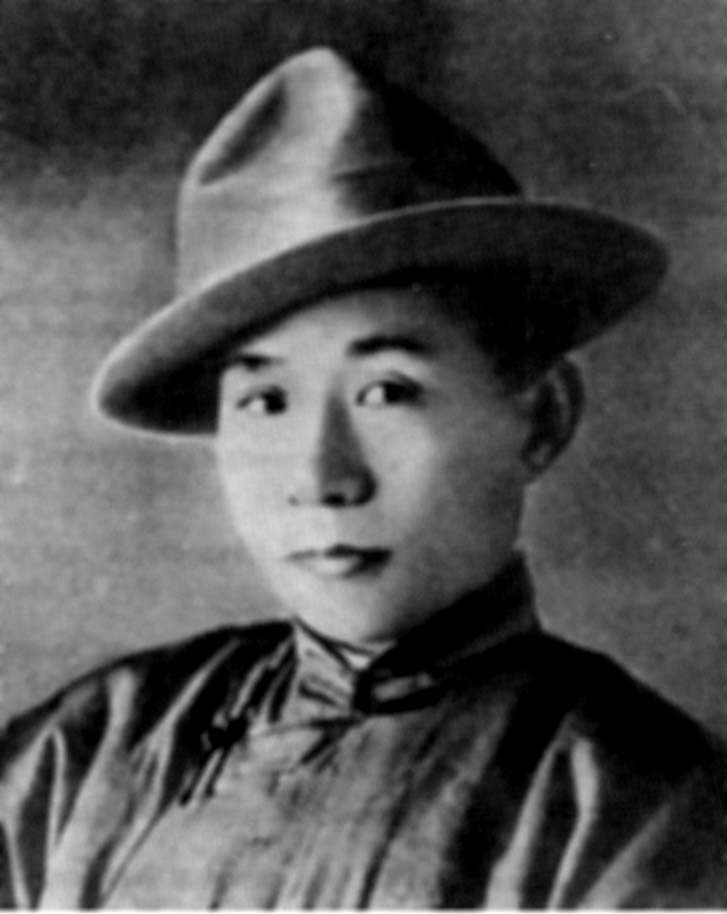
Ayuush

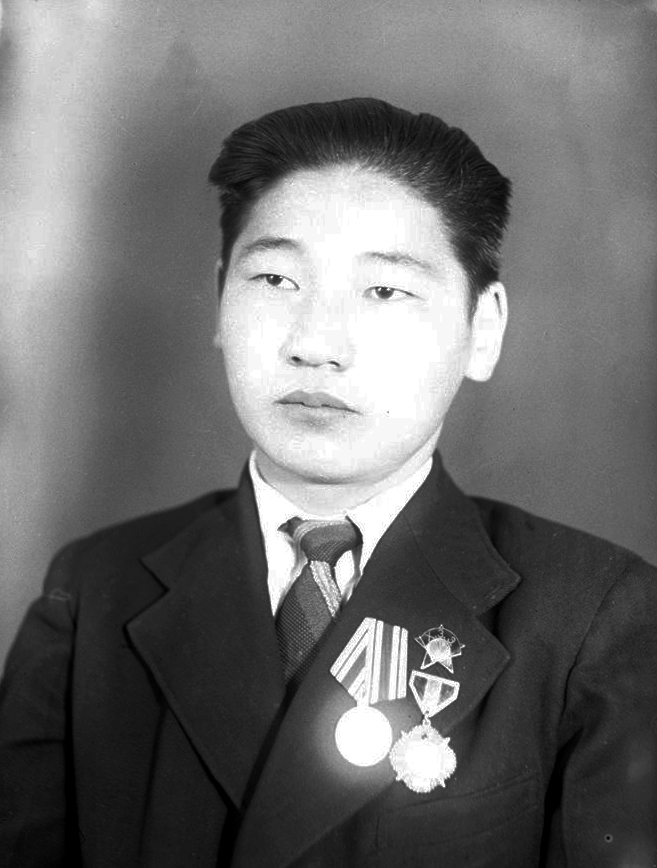
Choidog

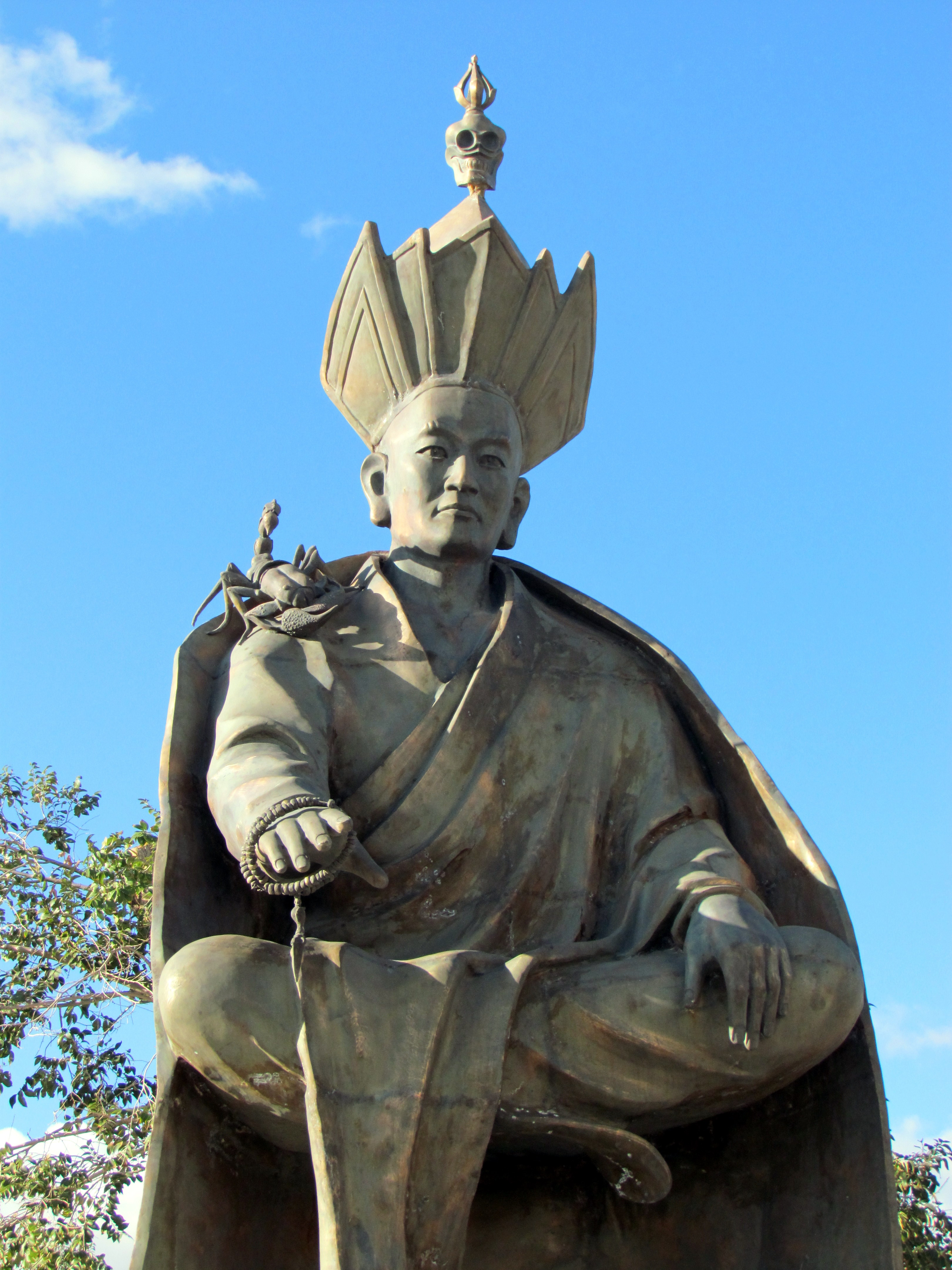
Danzanravjaa

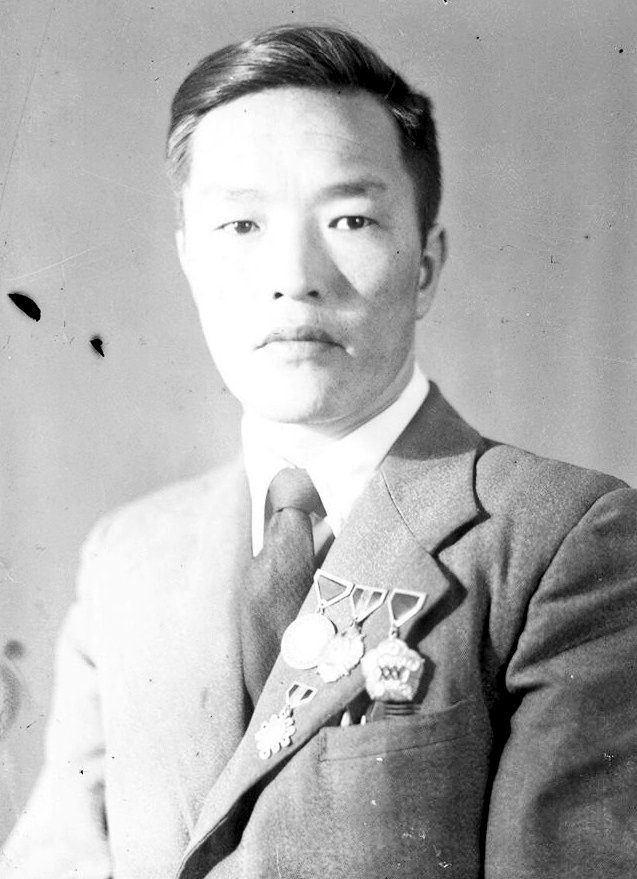
Mördorj

=== Popular music musicians ===
- Amguulan (b. 1984), singer-songwriter.
- Altan Urag, folk rock band.
- Ankhmaa (b. 1986), singer.
- Ariunaa (b. 1967), singer.
- Camerton, boy band.
- Bold, singer.
- Buren Bayaer (1960–2018), singer, composer and journalist.
- Enkhjargal Dandarvaanchig (b. 1968), musician.
- Dami Im (b. 1988), Korean Australian singer-songwriter partly of Mongolian descent.
- Sa Dingding (b. 1979), folk singer-songwriter of mixed Mongolian Chinese and Chinese ethnicity. She also plays traditional instruments such as the guzheng and morin khuur.
- Nature Ganganbaigal (1990–2019), music performer, songwriter, producer and film music composer.
- Hurd, heavy metal band.
- Kharanga, hard rock band.
- Ganbaataryn Khongorzul, traditional long song singer.
- Kiwi, girl band.
- Namgar Lhasaranova, Russian singer of Buryat ethnicity and leader of the band Namgar.
- Lipstick, girl band.
- Magnolian, singer-songwriter and indie folk artist.
- Nominjin, R&B singer.
- Nomin talst, boy band.
- Soyol Erdene, rock band.
- Daichin Tana (b. 1983), singer-songwriter.
- Jamyangiin Urantögs, singer.
- Dain ba Enkh, hip hop band.
- Lumino (band), hip hop group.
- Oyunaa (b. 1975), singer based in Japan.
- O.Z (b. 1989), pop singer-songwriter & recording artist.
- Sarantuya, singer.
- Sambuugiin Serchmaa, singer.
- The Hu, rock band.
- Tengger (b. 1961), singer.
- Uka, singer.
- Wuyuntana, Mongolian Japanese singer, contributed vocals to anime such as Macross Plus, Shamanic Princess, Betterman and the first Cardcaptor Sakura movie.
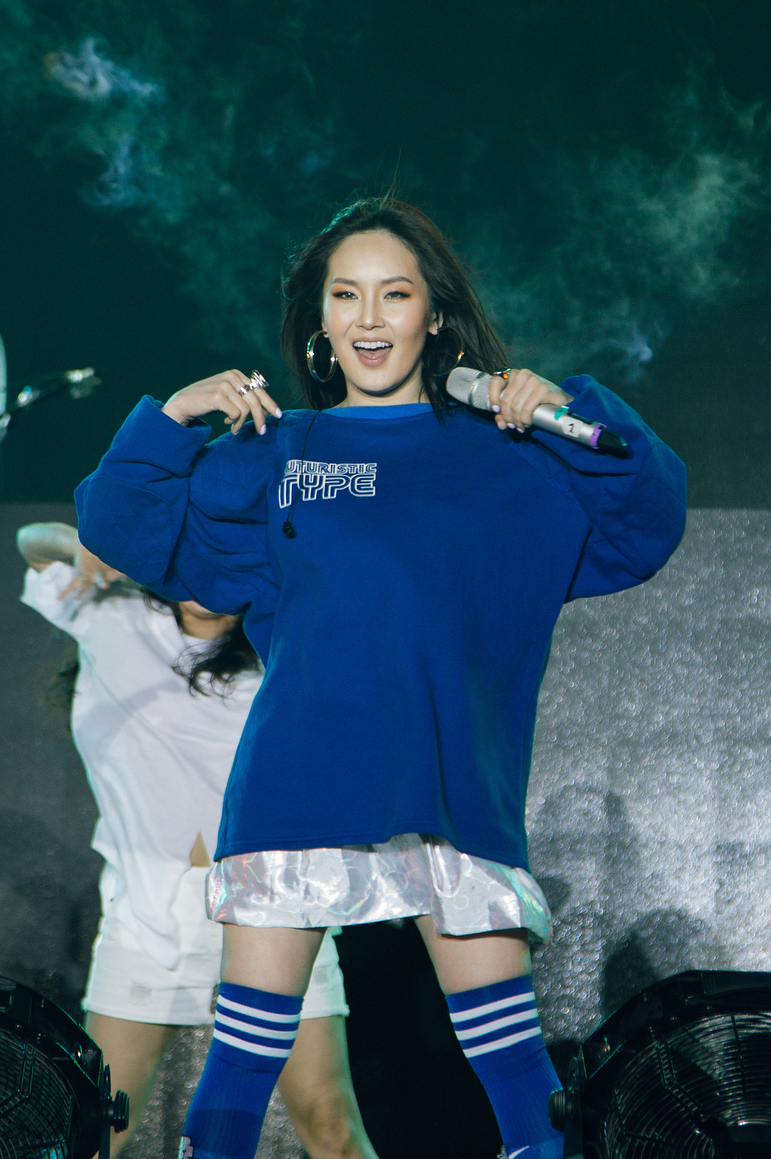
Ankhmaa

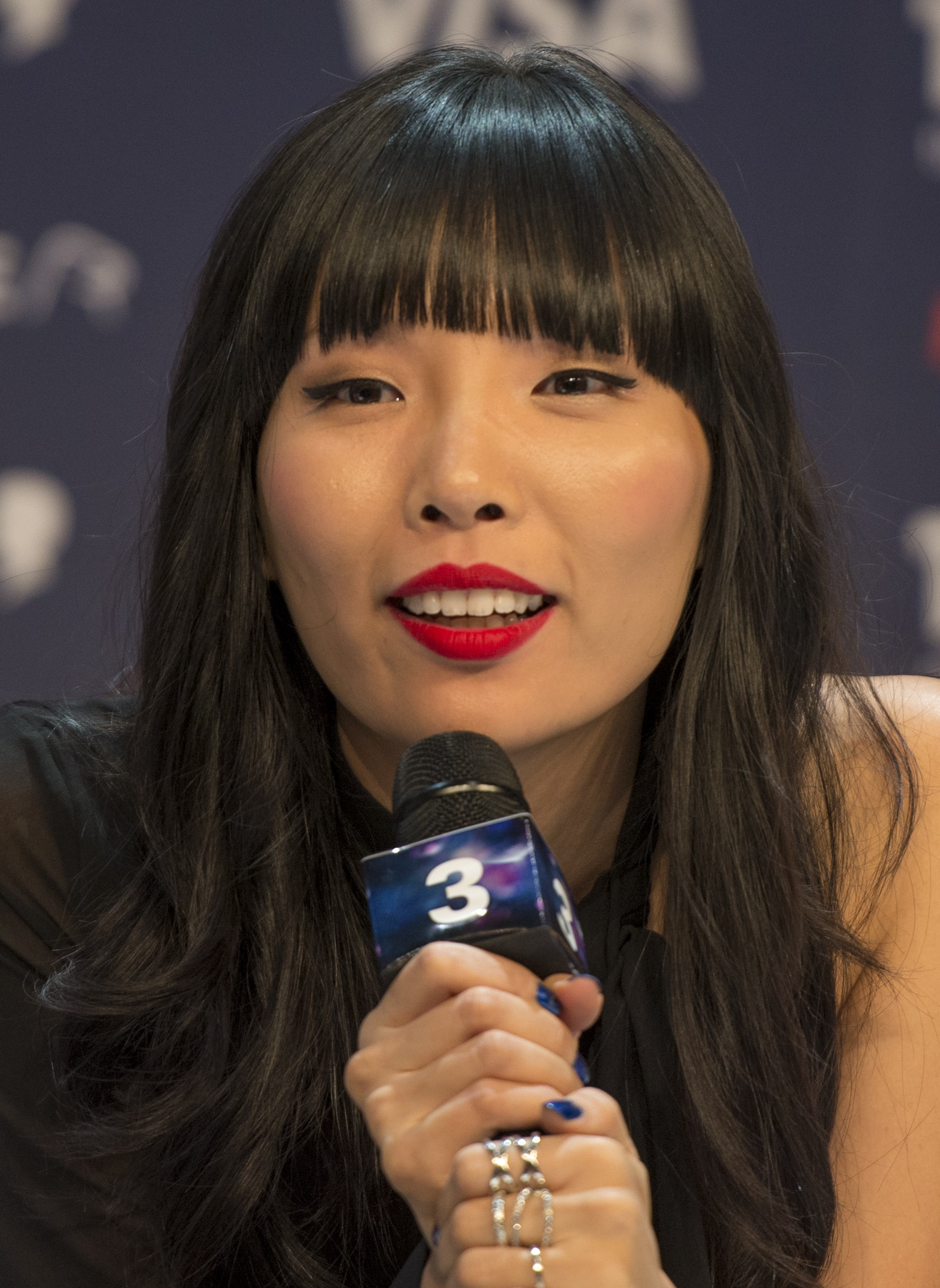
Dami Im

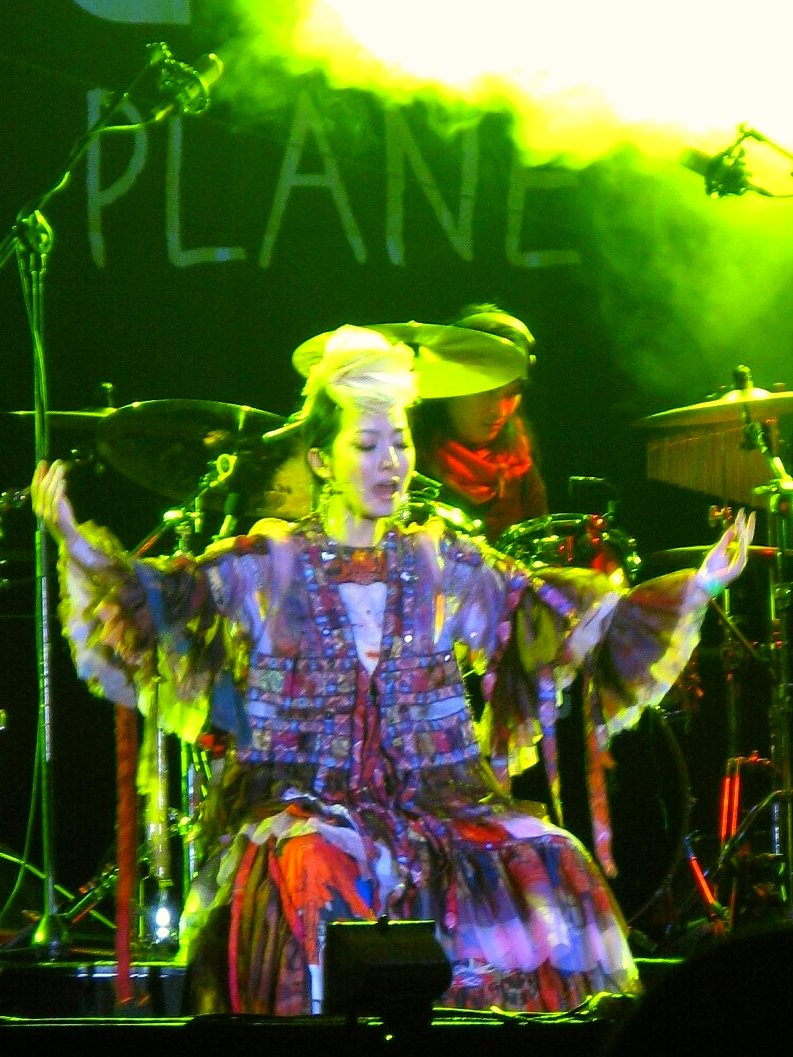
Dingding

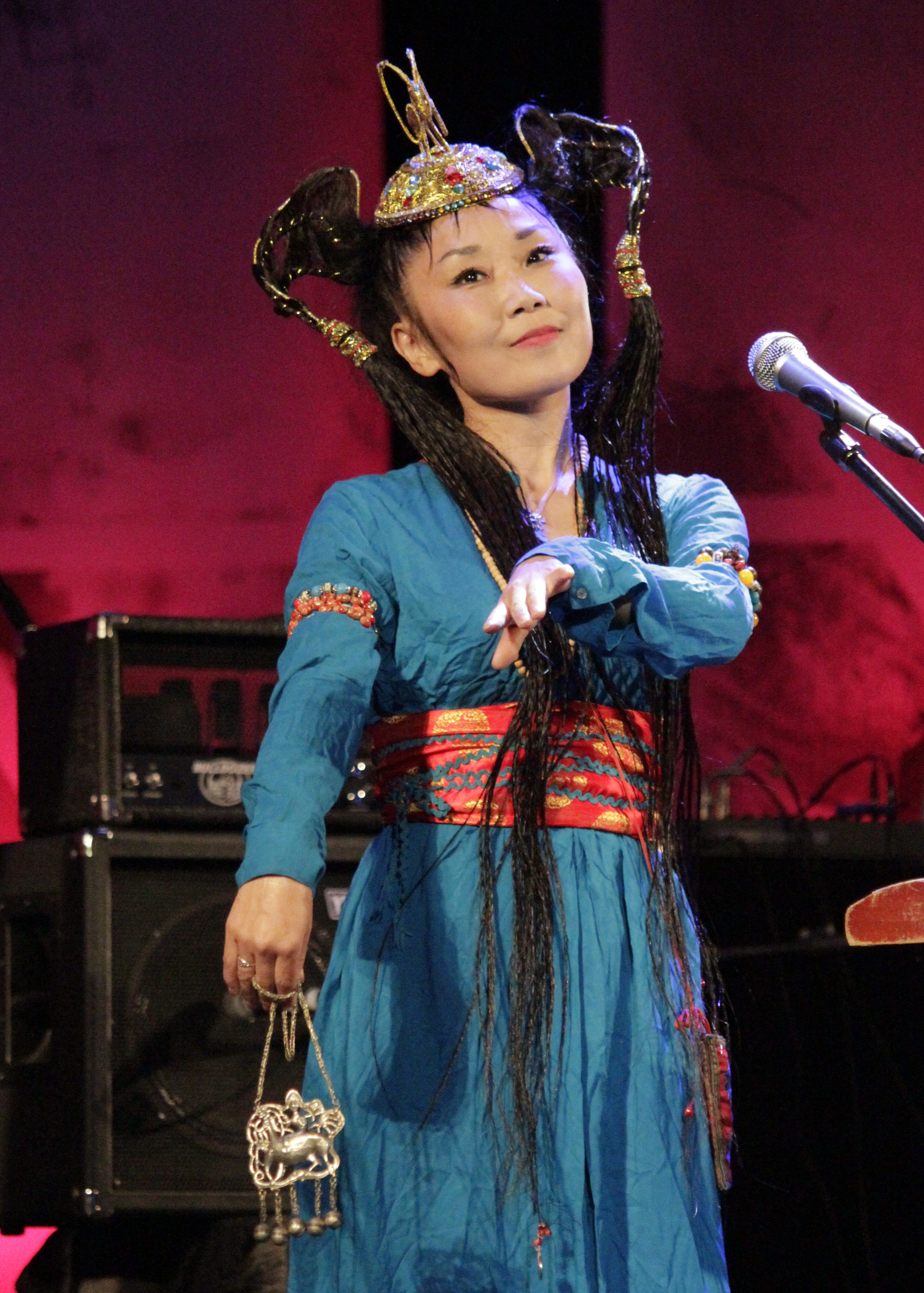
Lhasaranova

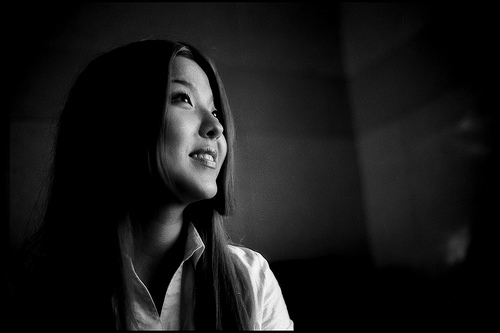
Nominjin

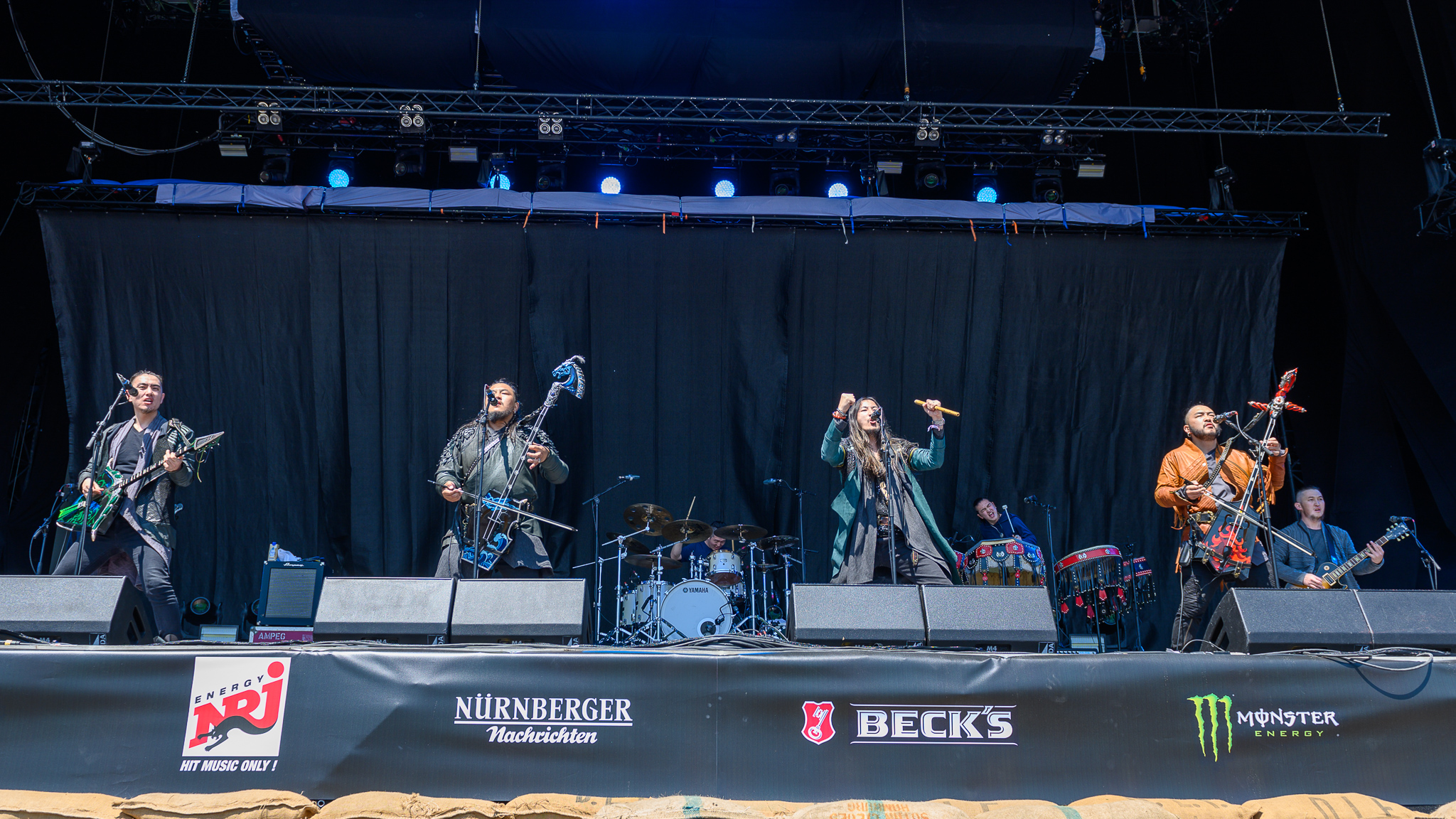
The Hu

== Artists ==
- Akbar (1542–1605), patron of the arts.
- Baatarzorig Batjargal (b. 1983), Mongol zurag-inspired contemporary painter.
- Nomin Bold (b. 1982), Mongol zurag-inspired contemporary painter.
- Uuriintuya Dagvasambuu (b. 1979), painter, described as a "contemporary master of Mongol Zurag".
- Farrukh Beg (c. 1545–c. 1615), painter of Kalmyk descent.
- Jantsankhorol Erdenebayar (b. 1992), multidisciplinary artist.
- Munkhbolor Ganbold (b. 1983), contemporary artist.
- Gongmin of Goryeo (1330–1374), grandson of Yasokjin and great-grandson of Princess Jeguk, painter.
- Evdokim Alekseevich Egorov (1832–1891), painter, etcher, the son of Alexei Yegorovich Yegorov.
- Heesco, artist based in Australia.
- Jahanara Begum (1614–1681), architect, designed the Chandni Chowk.
- Munkhtsetseg Jalkhaajav (b. 1967), contemporary artist.
- Feodor Iwanowitsch Kalmyk (1763–1832), painter and sculptor of Kalmyk ethnicity.
- Alexei Yegorovich Yegorov (1776–1851), Russian painter of Kalmyk descent.
- Xi Murong (b. 1943), painter and writer based in Taiwan.
- Anu Namshir (b. 1991), model, graphic designer and beauty pageant.
- Gankhüügiin Pürevbat (b. 1965), painter.
- Puru (1896–1963), painter.
- Zayasaikhan Sambuu (b. 1975), painter.
- Dolgor Ser-Od (b. 1973), painter.
- Marzan Sharav (1869–1939), painter.
- Enkhbold Togmidshiirev (b. 1978), artist.
- Gombojab Tsybikov (1873–1930), photographer, ethnographer, social anthropologist and explorer, credited as the first photographer of Tibet.
- Davaajantsangiin Sarangerel (born 1963), photographer.
- Ürjingiin Yadamsüren (1905–1987), Mongol zurag painter.
- Yongqi (1741–1766) of Aisin-Gioro, son of the Mongol Keliyete Noble Consort Yu, painter.
- Yongrong (1744-1790) of the House of Aisin-Gioro, painter.
- Yunxi (1711–1758) of the House of Aisin-Gioro, a great-grandson of Empress Dowager Xiaozhuang, painter.
- Zanabazar (1635–1723), sculptor, painter, architect, poet, costume designer, scholar and linguist, beside being the supreme spiritual authority of the Gelugpa lineage of Tibetan Buddhism in Outer Mongolia.
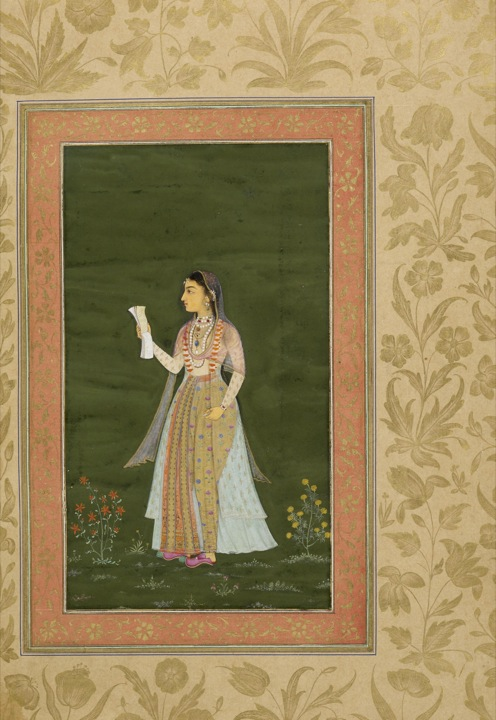
Jahanara Begum

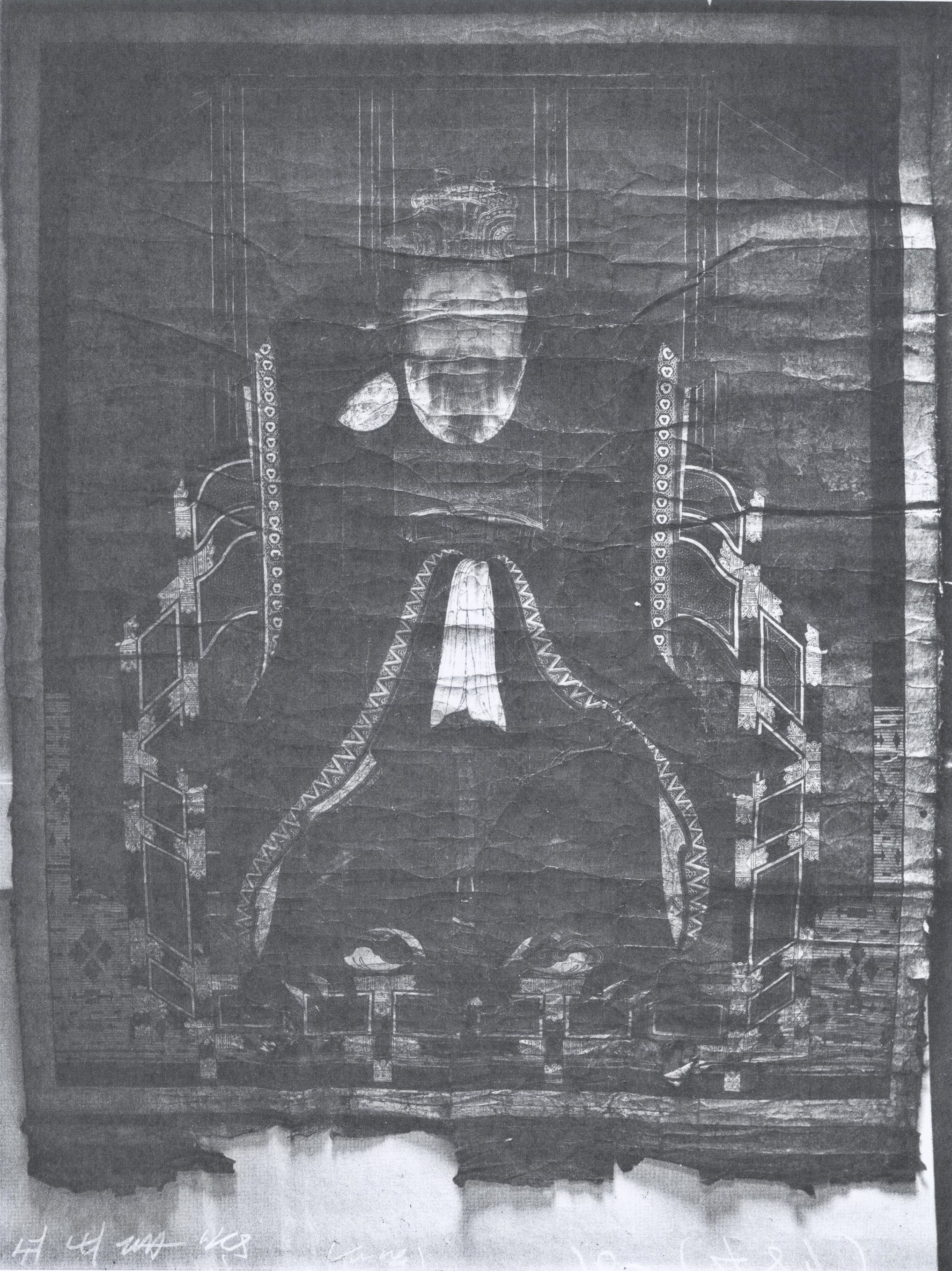
Gongmin

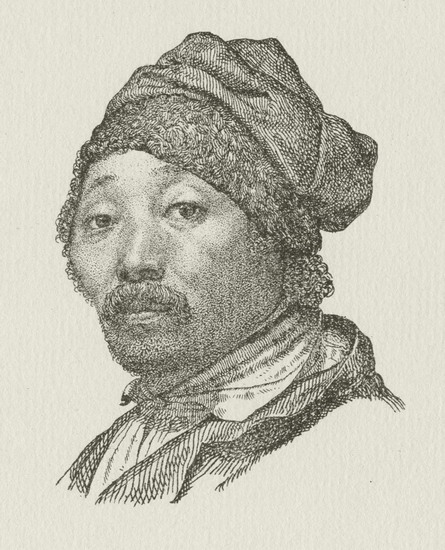
Kalmyk

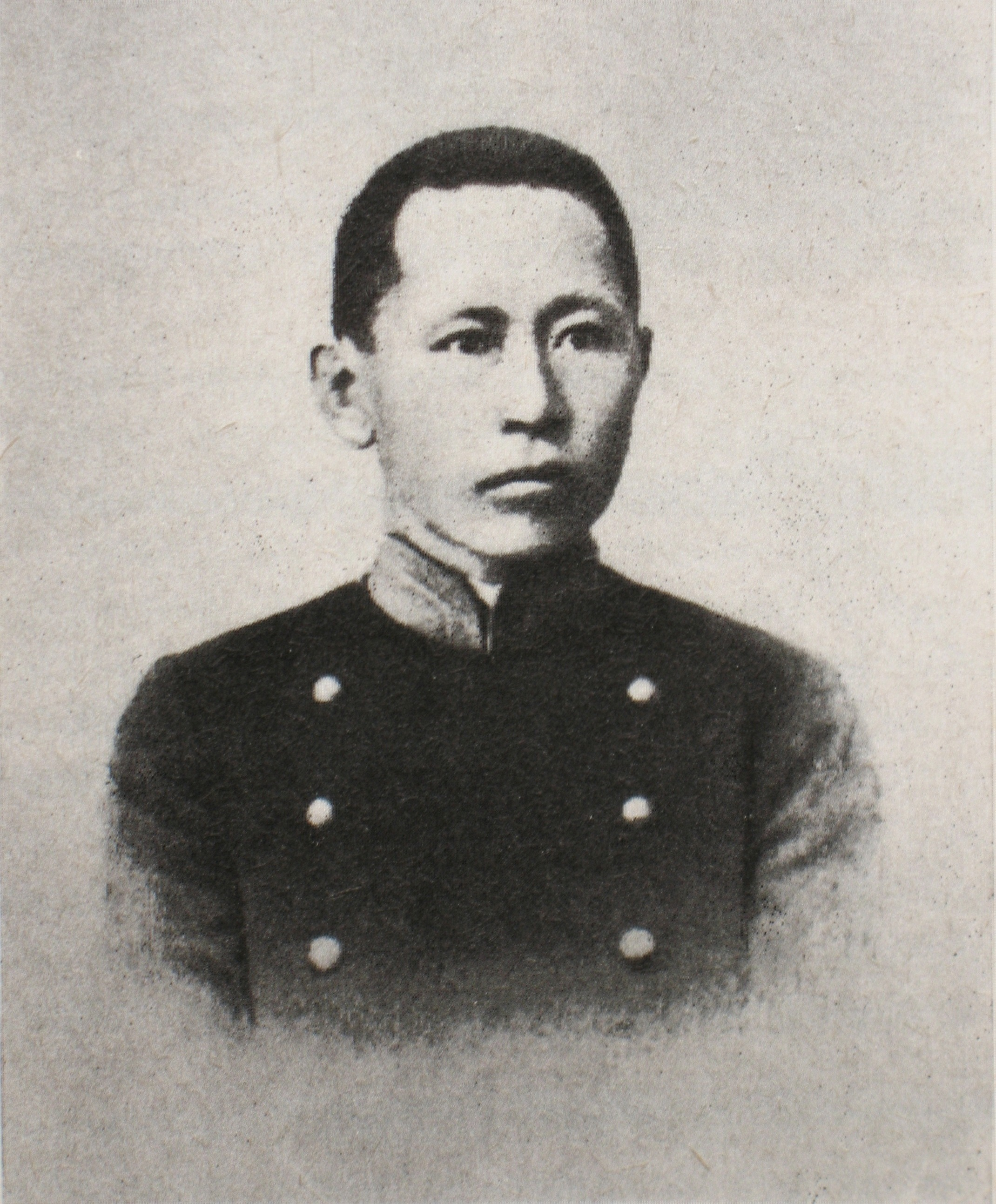
Tsybikov

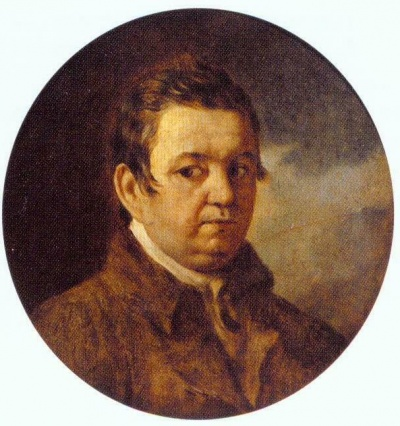
Yegorov

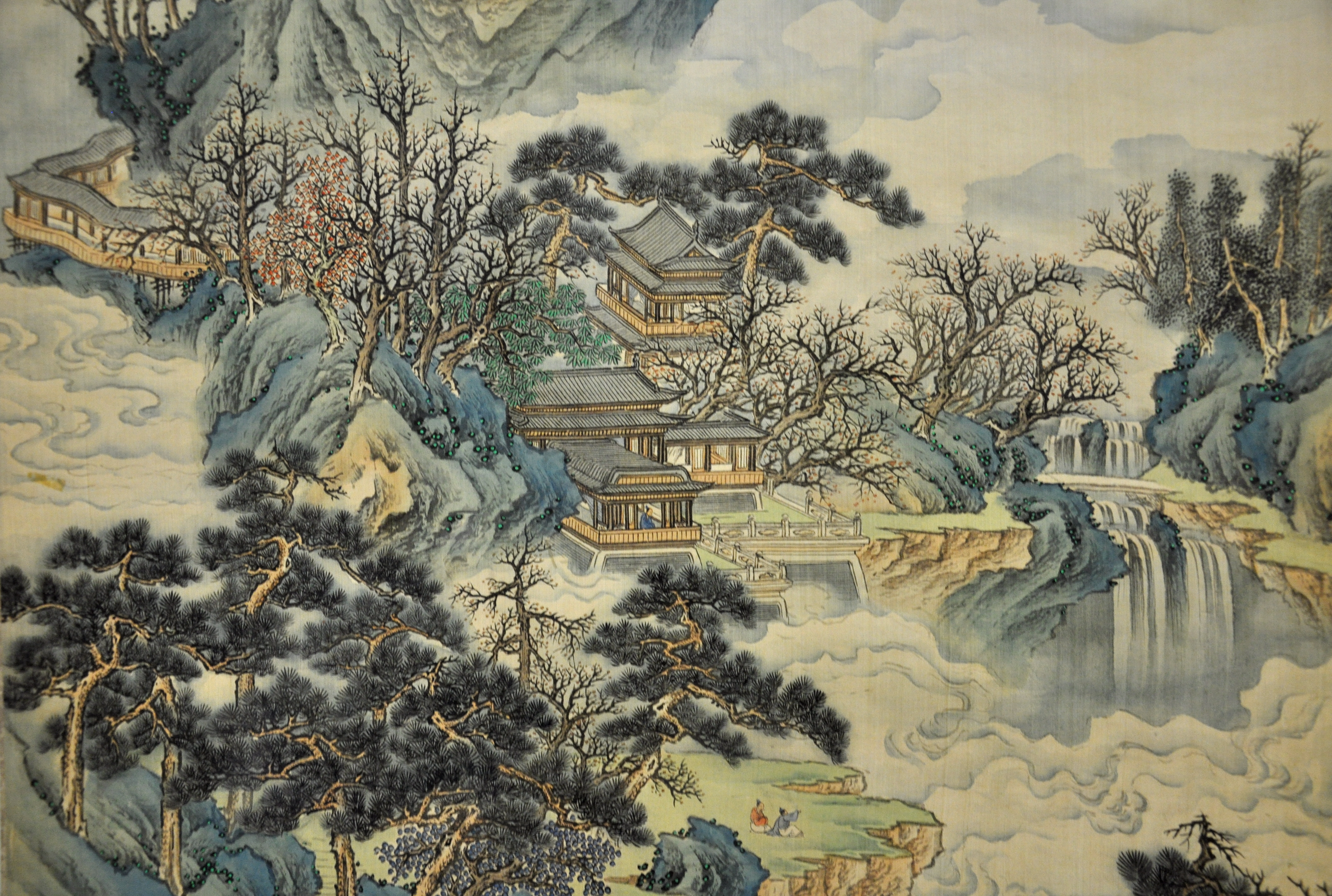
Yongrong

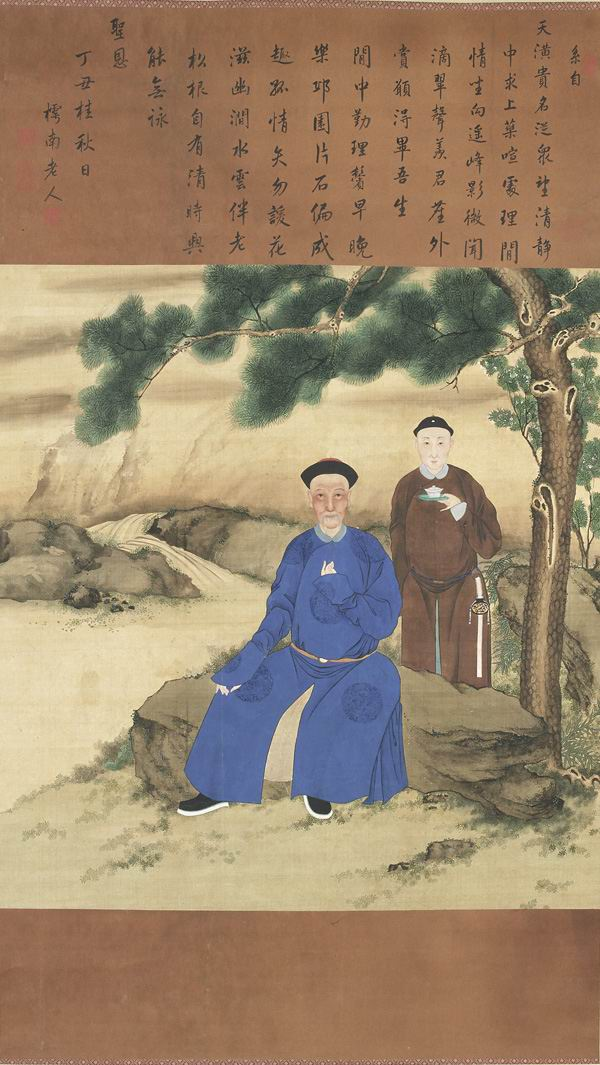
Yunxi

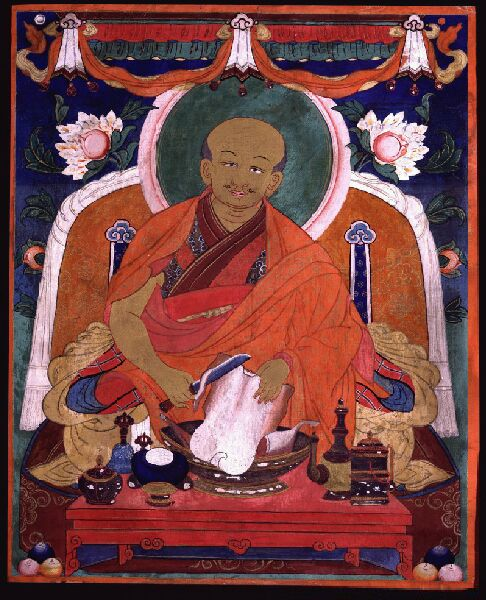
Zanabazar

== Writers ==
See also: Mongolian literature
- Abu al-Ghazi Bahadur (1603–1663), descendant of Genghis Khan, writer, author of the Shajara-i Tarākima.
- Anonymous author of the Hüis Tolgoi (fl. 600).
- Anonymous author of The Secret History of the Mongols (fl. 1240s).
- Damdinsürengiin Altangerel (1945–1998), writer.
- Babur (1483–1530), writer, author of the Baburnama.
- B. Burinbeki (1928–2009), poet.
- Ryenchinii Choinom (1936–1978), writer, artist.
- Tsendiin Damdinsüren (1908–1986), writer.
- Dulduityn Danzanravjaa (1803–1856), writer, composer, painter, physician.
- Ochirbatyn Dashbalbar (1957–1999), writer, politician.
- Shagdaryn Dulmaa (1934–2024), poet.
- Sengiin Erdene (1929–2000), writer.
- Mend-Ooyo Gombojav (b. 1952), writer.
- Vanchinbalyn Gularans (1820–1851), writer.
- Gulbadan Begum (1523–1603), writer, author of the Humayun Nama.
- Vanchinbalyn Injinash (1837–1892), writer.
- Jahangir (1569–1627), writer, author of the Tuzk-e-Jahangiri.
- David Kugultinov (1922–2006), Russian poet of Kalmyk descent. 2296 Kugultinov is named after him.
- Chadraabalyn Lodoidamba (1917–1970), writer.
- Guush Luvsandanzan (fl. 1604), writer.
- Kamran Mirza (1512–1557), prince to whom is attributed a divan written in Persian and Chagatai.
- Dashdorj Natsagdorj (1906–1937), poet, playwright, writer.
- Xiao Qian (1910–1999), essayist, editor, journalist and translator.
- Byambyn Rinchen (1905–1977), linguist, writer.
- Jigjidin Byamba (1933–1992), writer, politician.
- Saghang Sechen (1604–after 1641), writer, historian and prince.
- Hadaa Sendoo (b. 1961), writer.
- Muhammad Shaybani (1451–1510), ruler and essayist.
- Ai Siqi (1910–1966), philosopher and author.
- Degii Sodbaatar, author and translator
- Alexander Vampilov (1937–1972), playwright.
- Wangchingbala (1795–1847), novelist, historian and nobleman.
- Begziin Yavuukhulan (1929–1982), writer.
- Chia-ying Yeh (1924–2024), FRSC, Chinese-born Canadian poet and sinologist of the Yehe Nara clan, of Tümed Mongol origin.
- Li Zhun (1928–2000), novelist and screenplay writer, vice-president of the China Writers Association, recipient of the 1985 Golden Rooster Award for Best Writing (for Wreaths at the Foot of the Mountain, 高山下的花环), and winner of the Mao Dun Literature Prize for his Yellow River Flowing to East (黄河东流去).
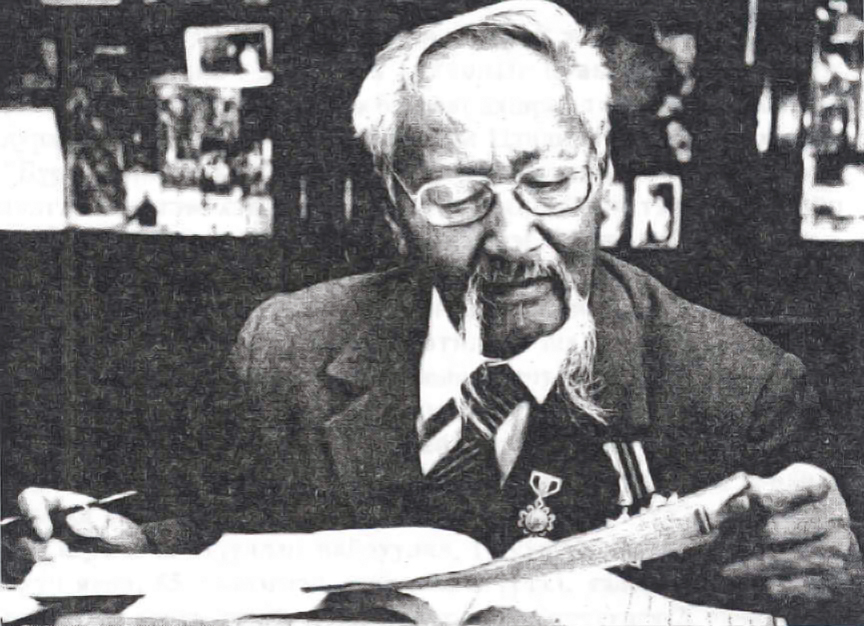
Damdinsüren

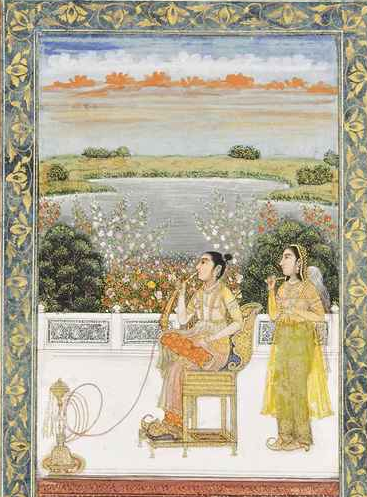
Gulbadan Begum

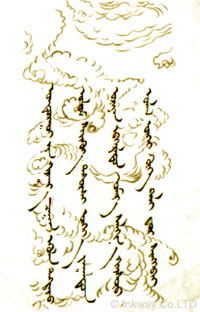
Injinash

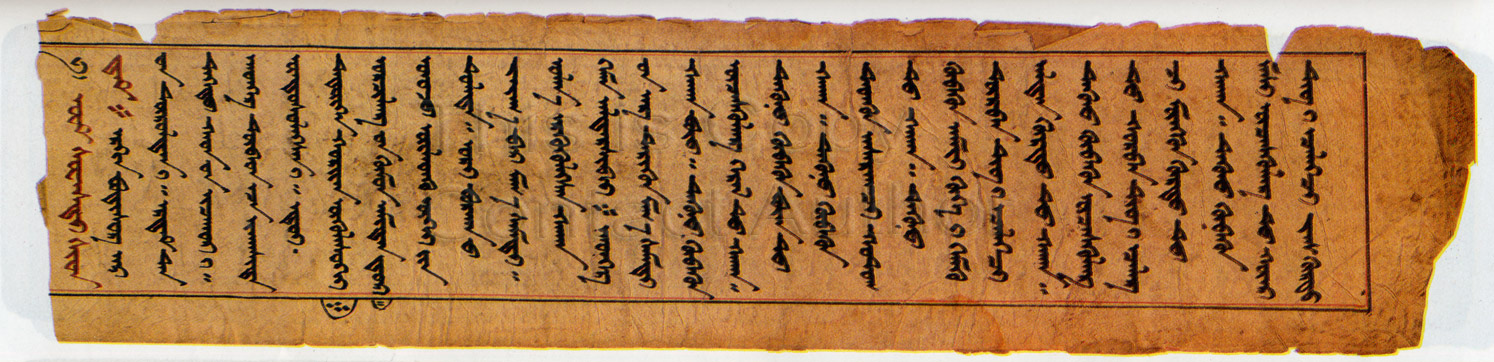
Luvsandanzan

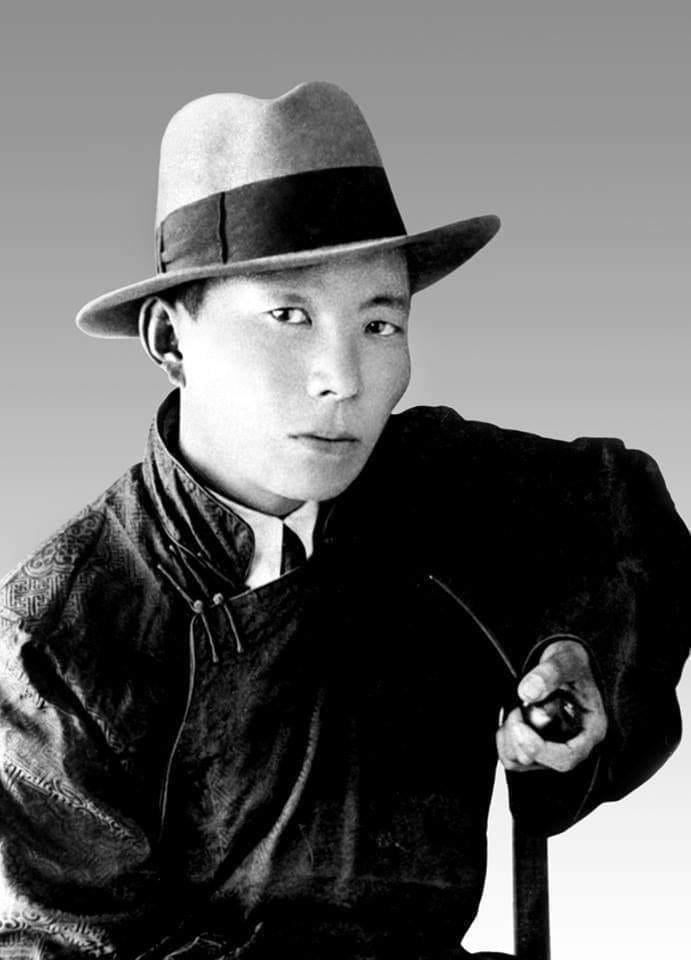
Natsagdorj

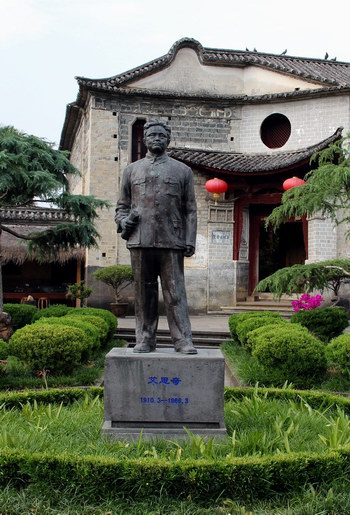
Ai Siqi

Wangchingbala

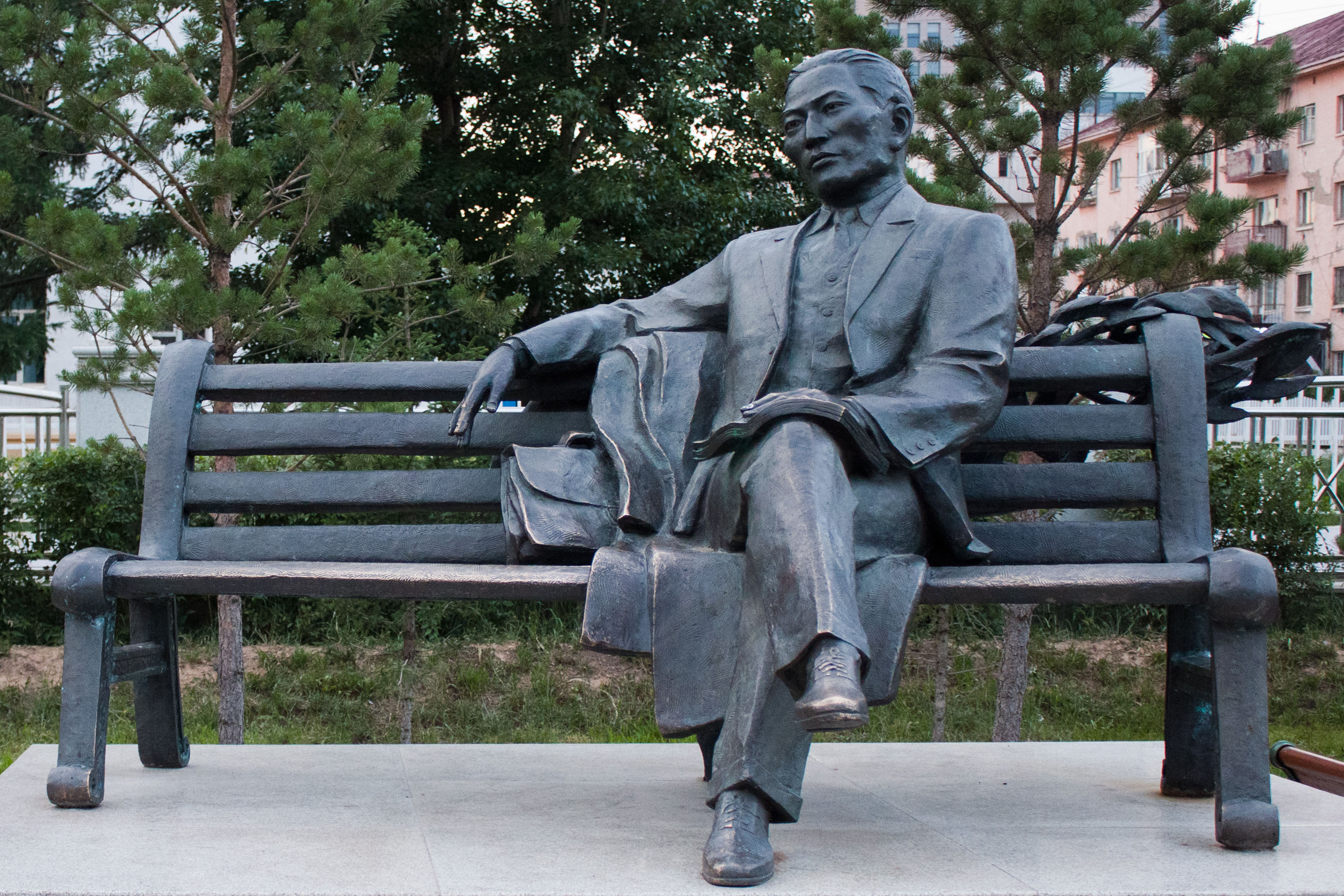
Yavuukhulan

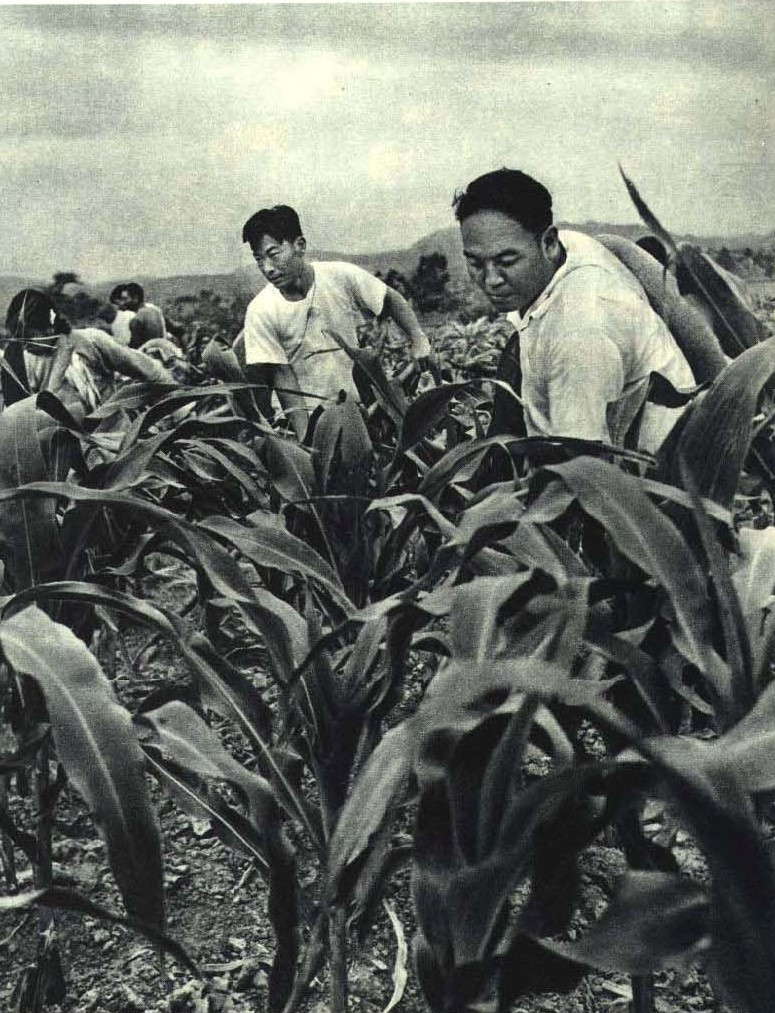
Li Zhun

== Movie industry ==
- Aliya (b. 1992), actress.
- Batdorj-in Baasanjab (b. 1954), actor.
- Badema (b. 1965), actress. She won the 33rd Fajr International Film Festival for best actress and the Golden Rooster Award for Best Actress in 2015 for her role in Norjmaa.
- Alex Borstein (b. 1971), actress, of Mongolian descent on her mother's side.
- Gana Bayarsaikhan, actress.
- Bayin (b. 1963), actor and director.
- Sergei Bodrov (b. 1948), Russian film director, screenwriter and producer partly of Mongolian descent, who directed such movies as the Academy Award and Golden Globe nominee Prisoner of the Mountains (1996), Running Free (2000), Nomad (2005), Mongol (2007), and Seventh Son (2014).
- Uisenma Borchu (b. 1984), film maker and actress based in Germany.
- Yul Brynner (1920–1985), Russian-American actor of Mongol descent, winner of the Tony Award for Best Featured Actor in a Musical in 1952 for his role in the Broadway musical The King and I, and of the Academy Award for Best Actor in 1956 for his role in The King and I (1956). He starred in many other historic movies, including The Ten Commandments (1956), Anastasia (1956), The Magnificent Seven (1960) and its sequel Return of the Seven (1966), Westworld (1973), and Futureworld (1976).
- Byambasuren Davaa (b. 1971), film maker based in Germany. She won the 2003 Bayerischer Filmpreis for her The Story of the Weeping Camel, and the 2006 Deutscher Filmpreis for Best Children's Picture for her The Cave of the Yellow Dog. The Story of the Weeping Camel was also nominated for an Oscar in the category Best Documentary at the 77th Academy Awards.
- Siqin Gaowa (b. 1950), Swiss actress of Mongolian descent, who starred in such films as Homecoming (1984) and Kangxi Dynasty (2001). She won the Hong Kong Film Award for Best Actress in 1984 and 2007, the Hong Kong Film Critics Society Award for Best Actress in 1995 and 2007, the Golden Rooster Award for Best Actress in 1983, the Flying Apsaras Awards Special Performance Award in 1996, and the Golden Phoenix Awards Special Contribution in 1993.
- Naren Hua (b. 1962), actress, who starred in such films as A Girl from Hunan (1986), A Mongolian Tale (1995), and Heavenly Grassland (2002). She won the Golden Rooster Award for Best Actress in 2011 for her role in Mother, for which she also won the 2011 Huabiao Award for Outstanding Actress. She also won two Golden Phoenix Award Society Awards and the 2003 Shanghai Film Critics Award for Best Actress for her performance in Heavenly Grassland.
- Valéry Inkijinoff (1895–1973), French actor of Buryat descent.
- Chuluuny Khulan (b. 1985), actress.
- Val Kilmer (b. 1959), actor. (Note: Kilmer stated in an interview that he is of Mongolian descent.)
- Ai Liya (b. 1965), actress, winner of the 1995 Huabiao Awards for Outstanding Leading Actress and of the 1995 Golden Rooster Award for Best Actress for her role in Ermo.
- Venus Lux (b. 1990), American pornographic actress, director, producer, and educator partly of Mongolian descent.
- Irina Pantaeva (b. 1967), Russian model and actress of Buryat descent, she starred in such films as Mortal Kombat Annihilation and As Far as My Feet Will Carry Me.
- Millie Perkins (b. 1938), American actress born to a father of Mongolian descent. She starred in such films as The Diary of Anne Frank (1959), The Shooting (1966), Ride in the Whirlwind (1966), Wild in the Streets (1966), and At Close Range (1986).
- Steven Seagal (b. 1952), actor, screenwriter, producer, martial artist, and musician. (Note: Seagal has stated that he is of Mongol (Kalmyk) descent in a 2007 interview. It is unknown whether this is accurate. Seagal is married to Erdenetuya Batsukh, of Mongolian ethnicity, with whom he has a son.)
- Brinke Stevens (b. 1954), American actress, screenwriter and model of German and Mongolian descent.
- Chien Te-men (1943–2018), actor.
- Daniella Wang (b. 1989), Chinese actress and fashion model of Mongolian ethnicity, who starred in such movies as Due West: Our Sex Journey (2012), Midnight Hair (2014) and The Stormy Night (2015).
- Freddie Wong (b. 1985), internet celebrity and filmmaker, of maternal Mongolian descent.
- Jimmy Wong (b. 1987), actor, played Ling in Mulan and Din Song in Wish Dragon, of maternal Mongolian descent.
- Wuershan (b. 1972), film director, known for directing films like Painted Skin: The Resurrection (2012), and Mojin: The Lost Legend (2015). He won the 2016 Hundred Flowers Award for Best Director for his Mojin: The Lost Legend.
- Yong Mei (b. 1970), Chinese actress of Mongol ethnicity who won the Golden Rooster Award for Best Actress of 2019 and the Silver Bear for Best Actress in 2019 for her performance in So Long, My Son (2019). She is the first Chinese actress to win a Silver Bear for Best Actress.
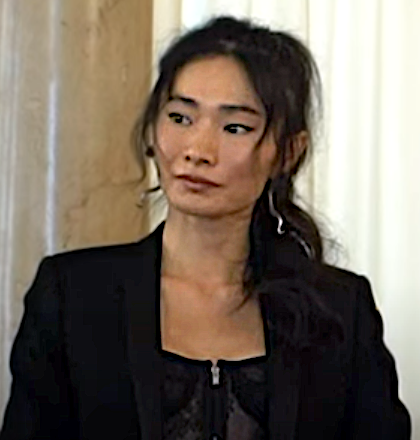
Bayarsaikhan

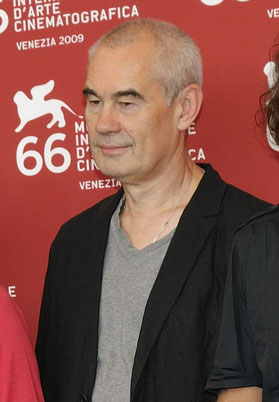
Bodrov

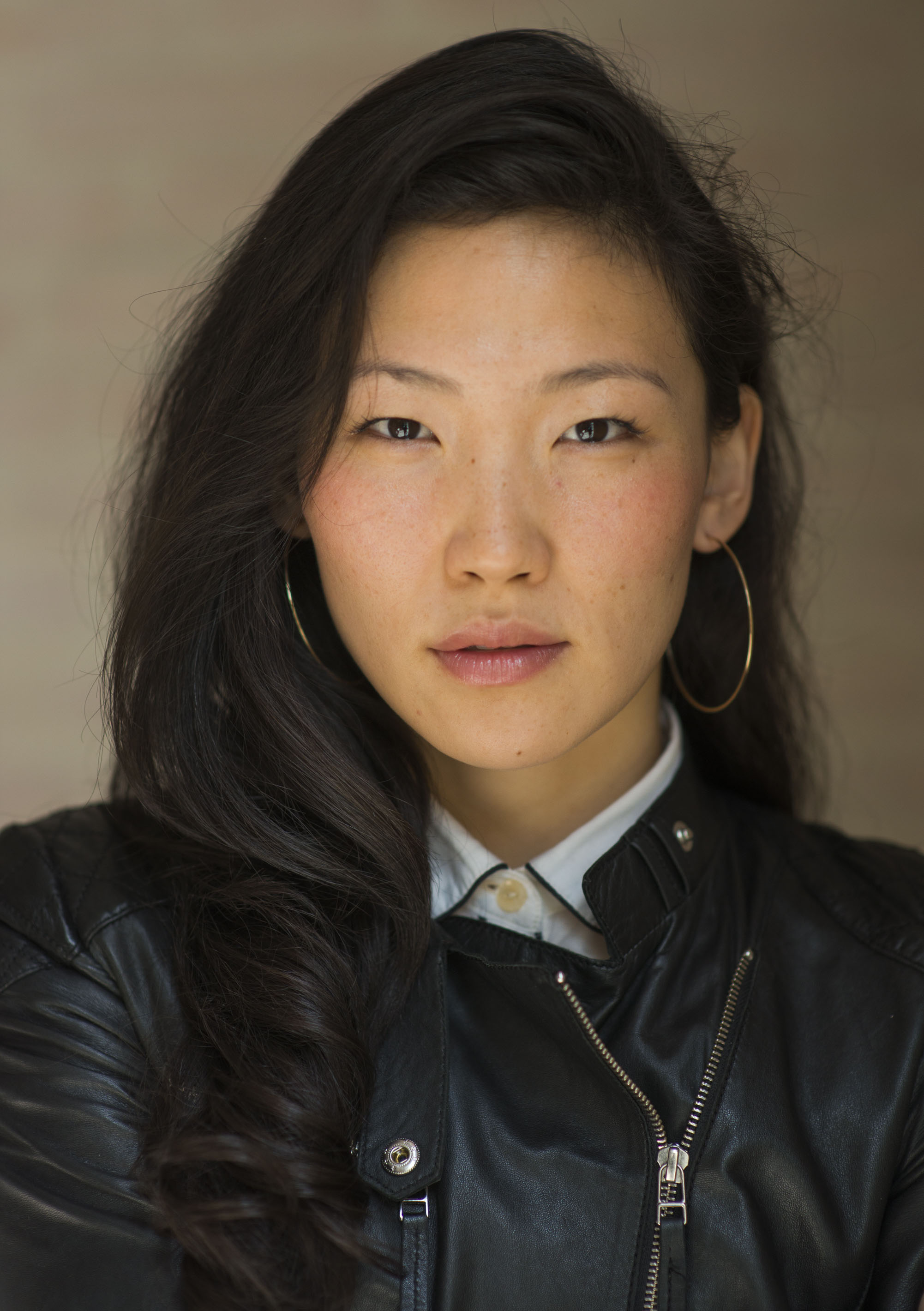
Borchu

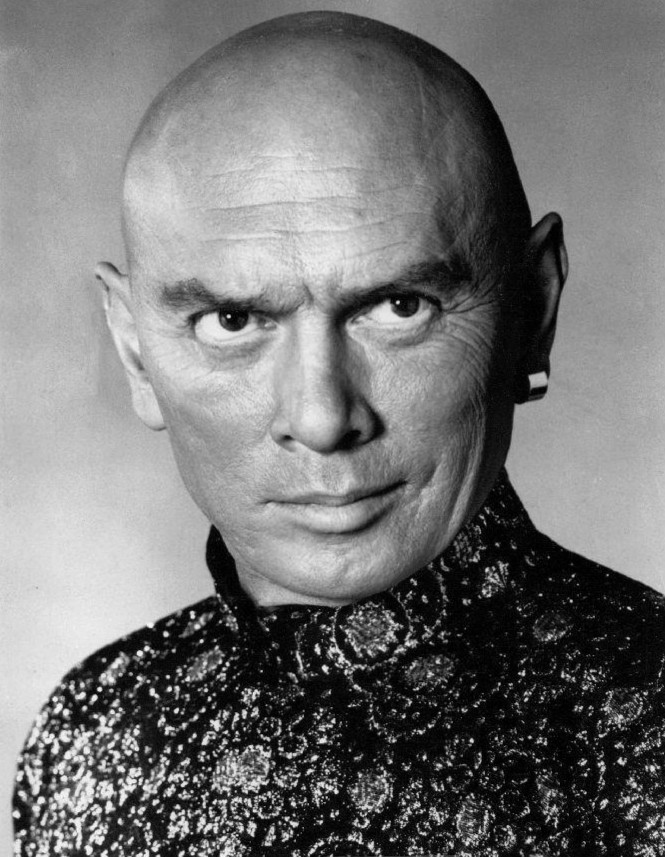
Brynner

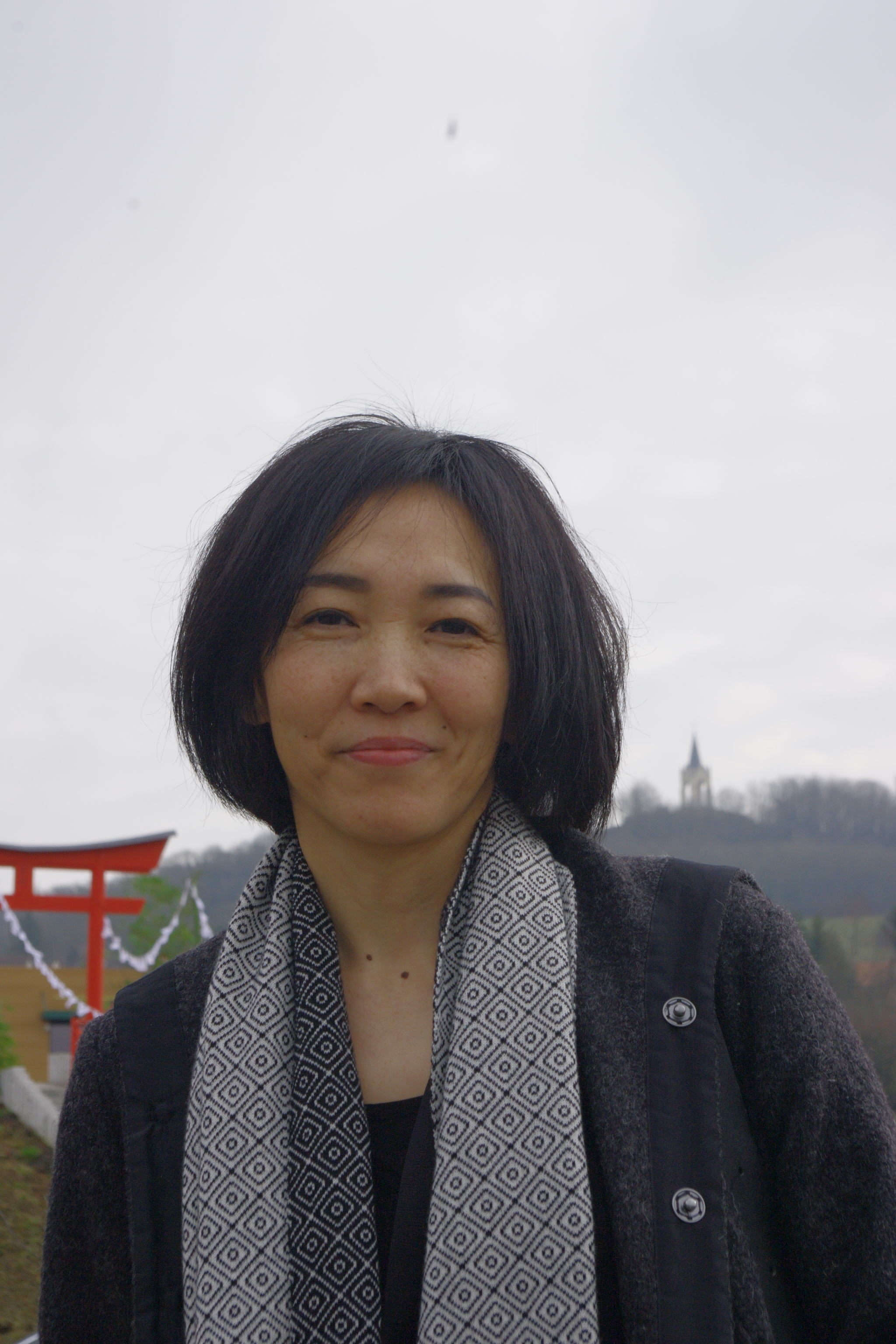
Davaa

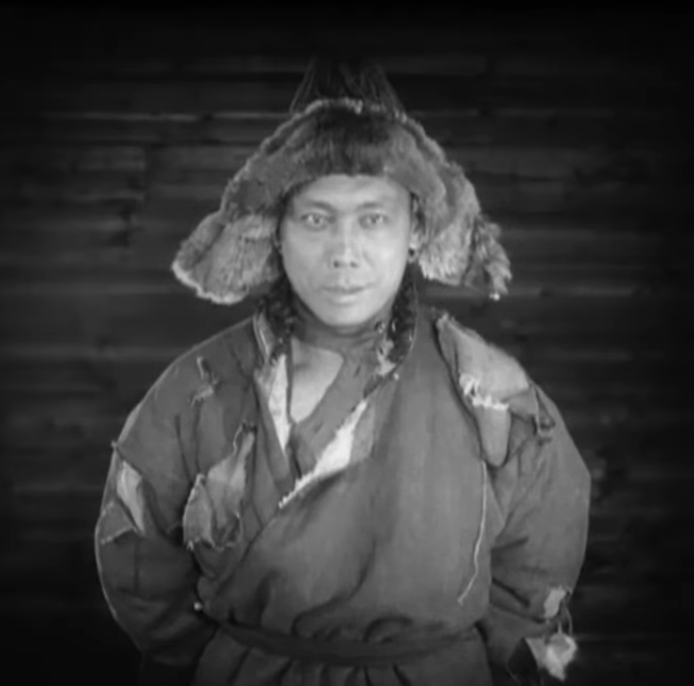
Inkijinoff

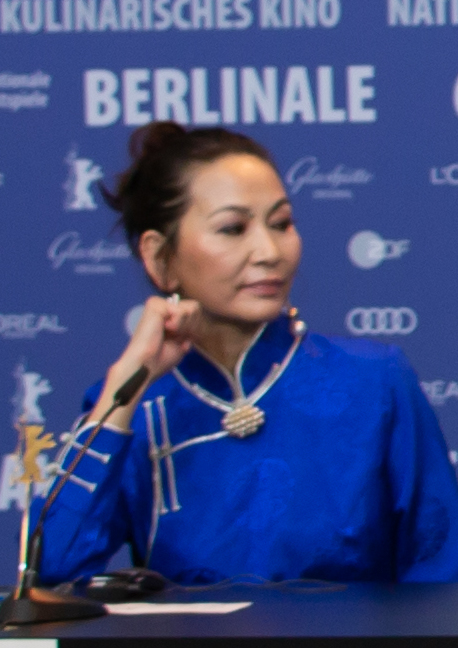
Ai Liya

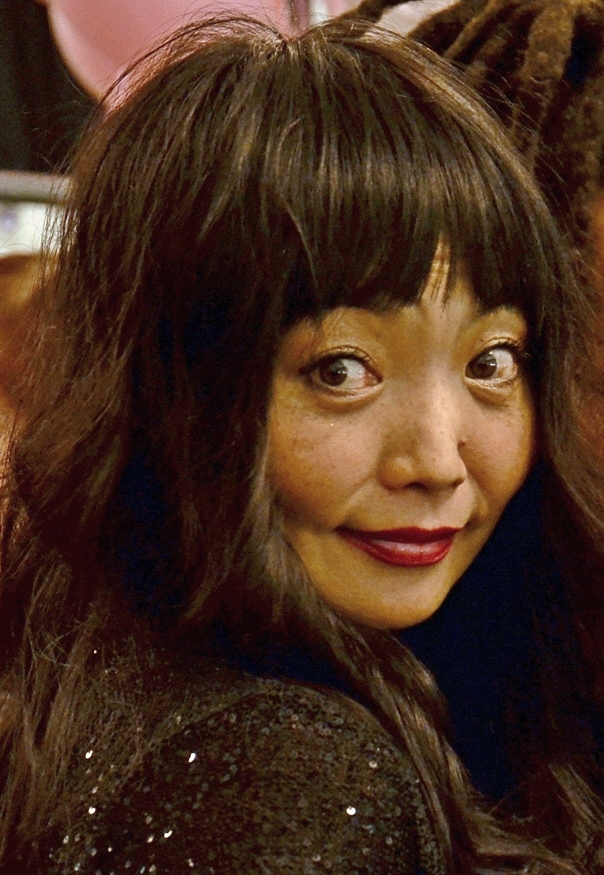
Pantaeva

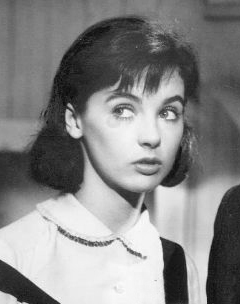
Perkins

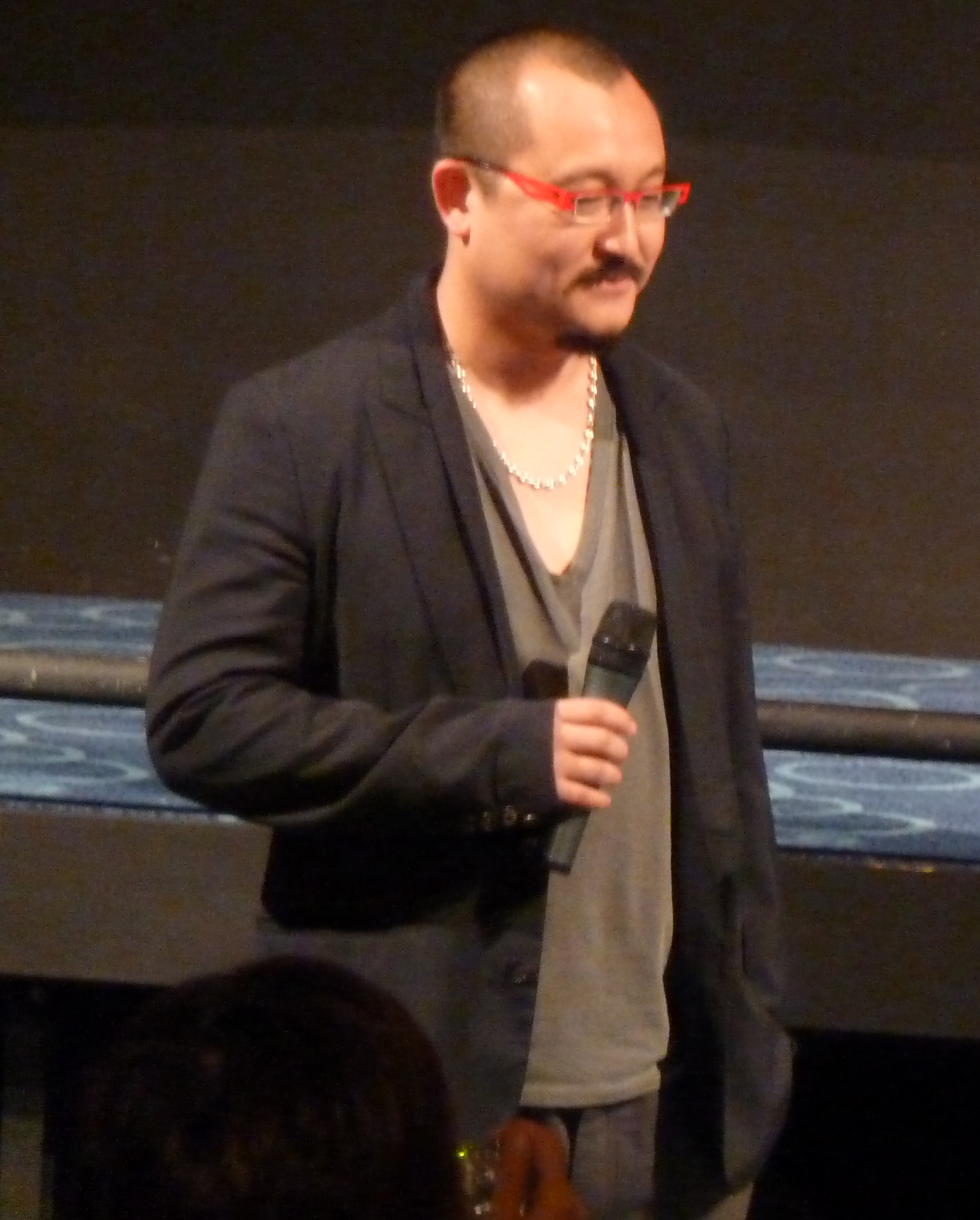
Wuershan

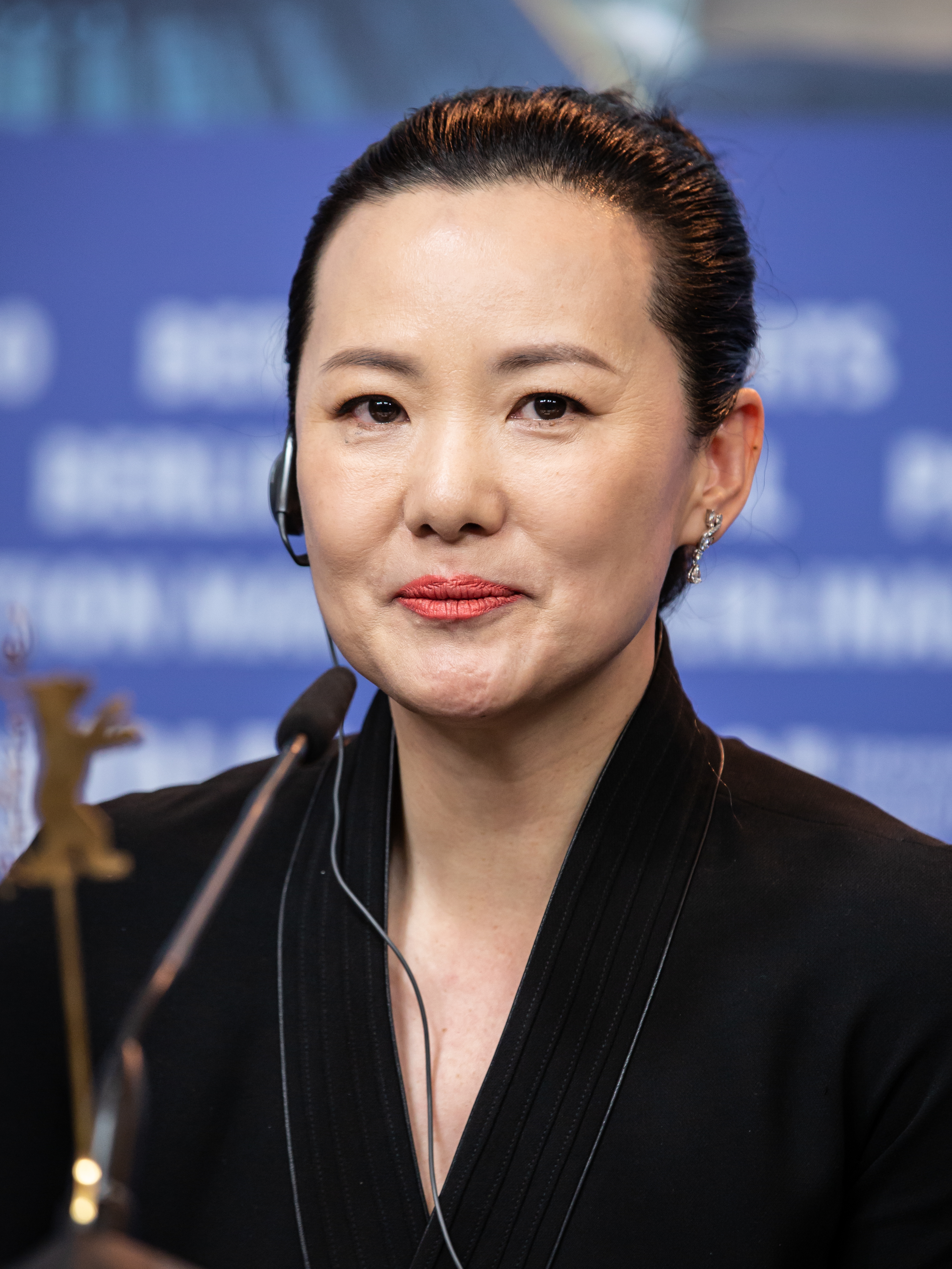
Yong Mei

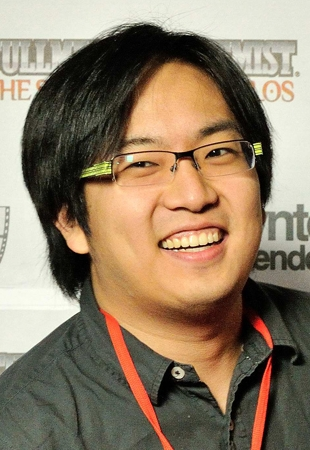
F. Wong

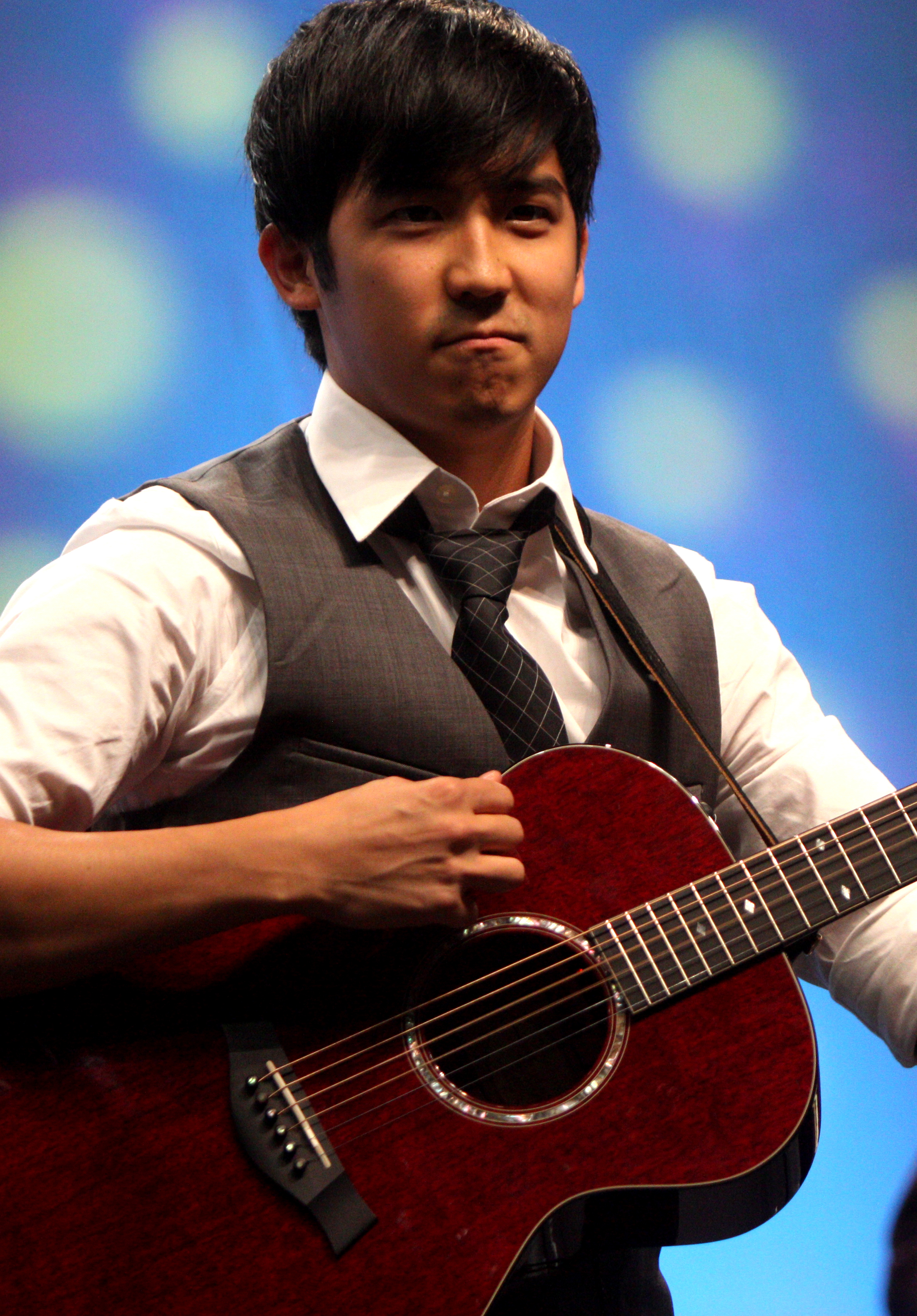
J. Wong

== Military leaders ==
- Arg Temur Rebelled against the Yuan dynasty with 100,000 soldiers
- Merik He is the first khan of the Yenisei Kingdom. He is one of the 3 Ögedei family members who participated in the European expedition.
- Abaoji (872–926), Khitan leader and founder of the Liao dynasty.
- Aju (1227–1287), general and chancellor.
- Amursana (1723–1757), Khoit-Oirat taishi (太师; 太師) and military leader.
- Queen Anu (1227–1287), queen consort and military leader.
- Ayusi (18th century), officer of the Qing dynasty, best known for his achievements against the Dzungar Khanate. His achievements allowed the Qing dynasty to pacify northern Xinjiang.
- Babur (1483–1530), founder of the Mughal Empire of Mongolian origin, and first Emperor of the Mughal dynasty (r. 1526–1530) in the Indian subcontinent. He was a descendant of Timur and Genghis Khan through his father and mother respectively.
- Baidar (13th century), commander.
- Baiju Noyan (fl. 1228–1260), Mongol commander in Persia, Anatolia and Georgia.
- Bayan of the Baarin (1236–1295), Mongol general of the Yuan dynasty.
- Berke (died 1266), military commander and grandson of Genghis Khan, ruler of the Golden Horde who effectively consolidated the power of the Blue Horde and White Horde.
- Bo'orchu (13th century), companion of Genghis Khan.
- Borokhula (13th century), general.
- Boroldai (13th century), general.
- Budugen (died 233 AD), chieftain.
- Changling (1758–1838), Qing dynasty official of Mongol descent, Chief Grand Councilor (1823–1824), Grand Secretary of the Wenhua Hall (1822–1838), General of Ili (1815–1817 and 1825–1827), Viceroy of Shaan-Gan and Viceroy of Yun-Gui.
- Chilaun (13th century), general.
- Khorloogiin Choibalsan (1895–1952), leader of Mongolia (Mongolian People's Republic) and Marshal (general chief commander) of the Mongolian People's Army from the 1930s until his death in 1952.
- Chormaqan (died in 1241), general.
- Yelü Dashi (1087–1143), Emperor of Qara Khitai and commander, who defeated the Seljuk Turks at the Battle of Qatwan.
- Wang Lijun (b. 1959), police officer who served as vice-mayor and police chief of the megacity of Chongqing. He conducted the Chongqing gang trials and was later involved in the Wang Lijun incident.
- Hulagu Khan (1215–1265), conqueror and ruler who conquered much of Western Asia, son of Tolui.
- Jebe (died in 1224), noyan (general).
- Jelme (c. 1160–1207), general and close companion of Genghis Khan.
- Jochi (c. 1182–February 1227), army commander, the son of Börte and Genghis Khan.
- Kadan (13th century), general who led the Mongol diversionary force that attacked Poland, while the main Mongol force struck the Kingdom of Hungary.
- Kebineng (190s–235), Xianbei chieftain.
- Batu Khan (c. 1205–1255), Mongol ruler and founder of the Golden Horde, son of Jochi and grandson of Genghis Khan.
- Nogai Khan (died c. 1300), general and kingmaker of the Golden Horde and a great-great-grandson of Genghis Khan.
- Khatanbaatar Magsarjav (1877–1927), military leader and later Prime Minister of Mongolia.
- Kitbuqa (died 1260), lieutenant.
- Kutlushah (1250–1307), general.
- Mamay (1335–1380), Mongol leader of the Golden Horde born into the Kiyat clan.
- Bodonchar Munkhag (c. 850–900), renowned Mongol warlord and a direct ancestor of Genghis Khan as well as of the Barlas Mongols, the tribe of the Central Asian warlord Timur.
- Yujiulü Mugulü (before 277–316 or after 330), Xianbei chieftain and warrior.
- Muqali (1170–1223), Mongol general, a trusted man of Genghis Khan.
- Negudar (13th century), Mongol general under Berke.
- Sali Noyan (13th century), Mongol general of the Möngke Khan.
- Qasar (13th century), military leader and archer, one of Genghis Khan's full-brothers.
- Qishan (1786-1854), Chinese nobleman and officer of Mongolian ethnicity, Viceroy of Sichuan, Liangguang, Zhili, Liangjiang, Shaan-Gan. Negotiated the Convention of Chuenpi with the British.
- Lü Pi (died 461), Rouran Duke and general of Northern Wei.
- Samagar (1234–1282), general of the Il-Khan ruler Abaqa Khan.
- Sengge Rinchen (1811–1865), nobleman and general, Jasagh and Prince Bodlogotoi of the Horqin Left Rear Banner. He served under the Qing dynasty, known for his role at the Battle of Taku Forts during the Second Opium War and his contributions in helping the Qing Empire to suppress the Taiping and Nian rebellions.
- Yujiulü Shelun (died 410), khagan of the Rouran from 402 to 410.
- Yuwen Tai (506–556), Xianbei paramount general of Western Wei.
- Shiregi (13th century), military leader and Mongol prince.
- Li Shouxin (1892–1970), pro-Japanese commander in the Manchukuo Imperial Army and later the Mengjiang National Army. Order of the Sacred Treasure.
- Songyun (1752–1835), military governor during the Qing dynasty born into a Khorchin clan. Amban of Xinjiang, Guangdong, and Tibet.
- Subutai (c. 1175–1248), general under Genghis Khan.
- Damdin Sükhbaatar (1893–1923), founding member of the Mongolian People's Party and leader of the Mongolian partisan army that took Khüree during the Outer Mongolian Revolution of 1921.
- Chaghan Temur (14th century), Yuan dynasty officer and military leader of Mongol ethnicity.
- Timur (1336–1405), Turco-Mongol conqueror born into the Barlas tribe who shared an ancestor with Genghis Khan on his father's side and allegedly was a direct descendant of Khan on his mother's side. Founded the Timurid Empire.
- Toqta (died c. 1312), khan of the Golden Horde, grandson of Batu Khan.
- Bai Wenqi (b. 1955), naval aviator who is a lieutenant general of the People's Liberation Army Air Force (PLAAF), a former vice admiral of the People's Liberation Army Naval Air Force (PLANAF), the incumbent Political Commissar of the Northern Theater Command Air Force and former Political Commissar of the Jinan Military Region Air Force.
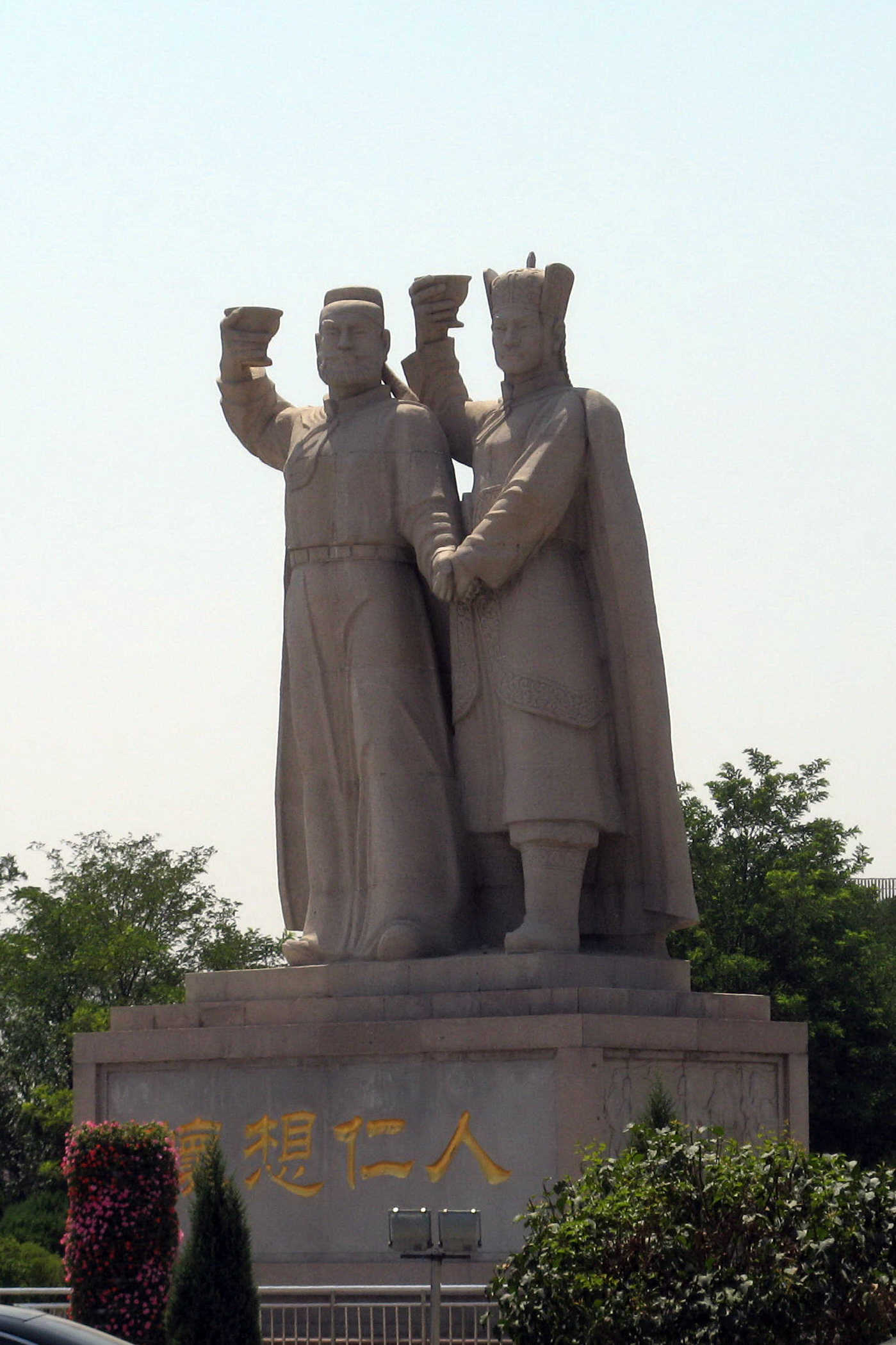
Abaoji

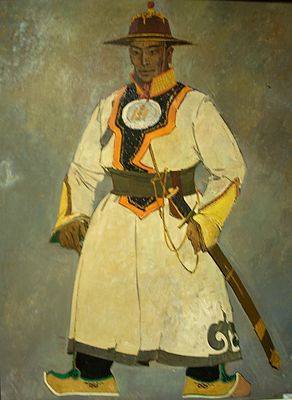
Amursana

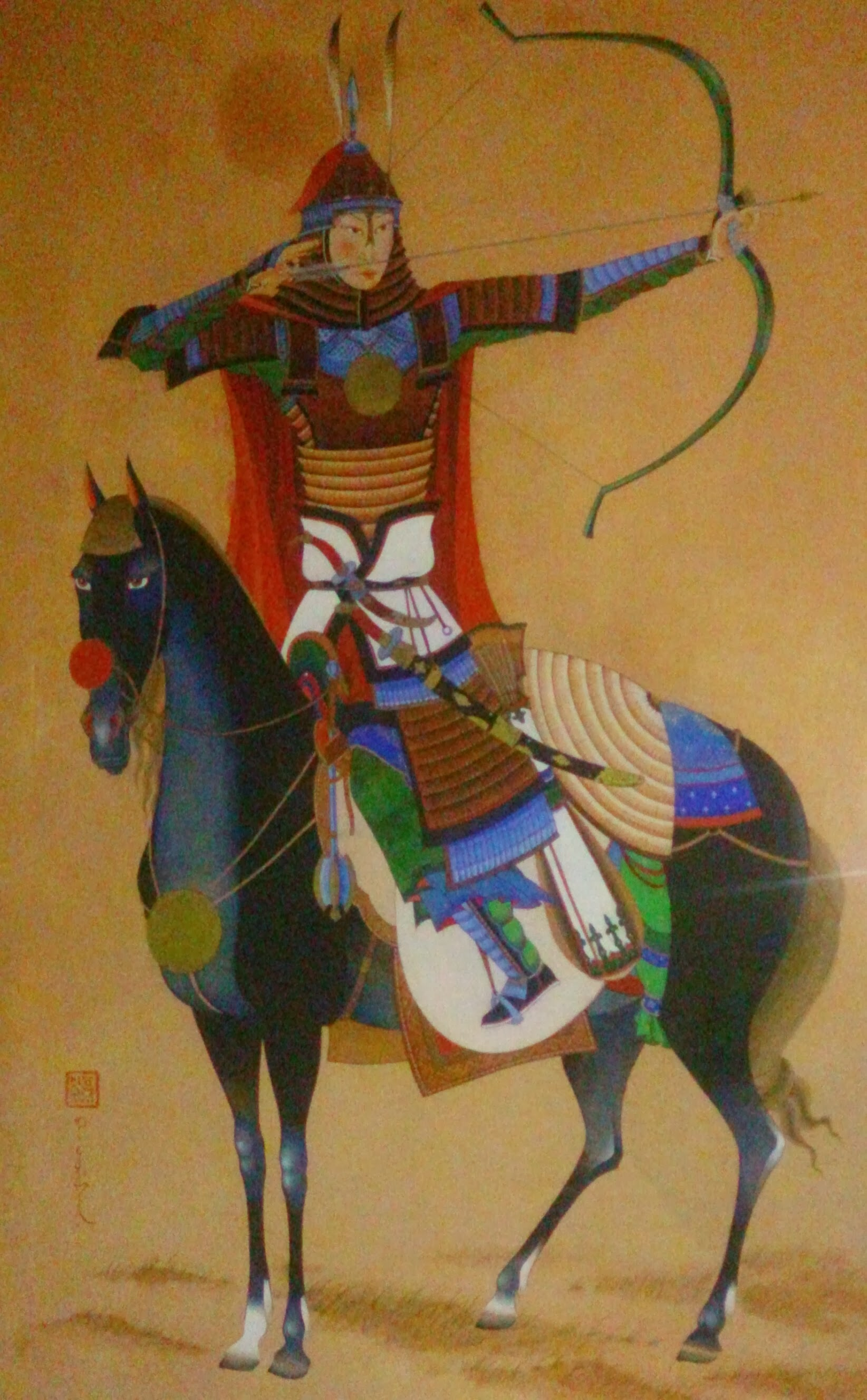
Anu

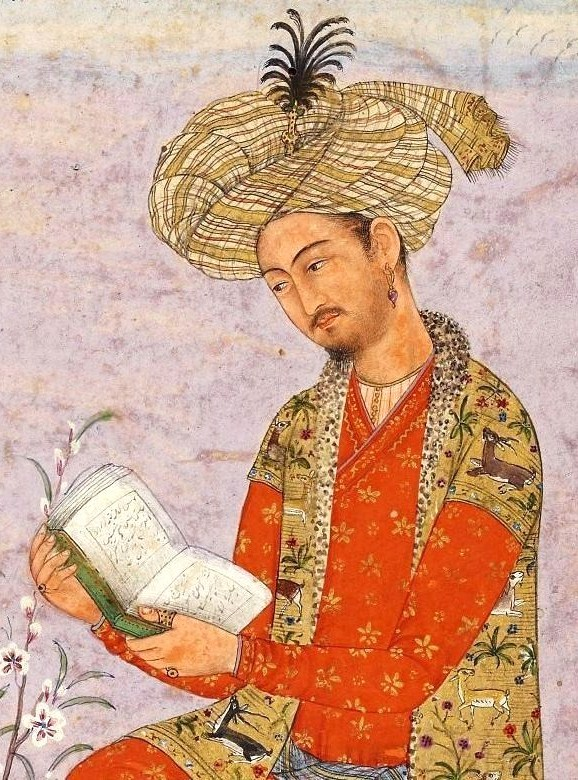
Babur

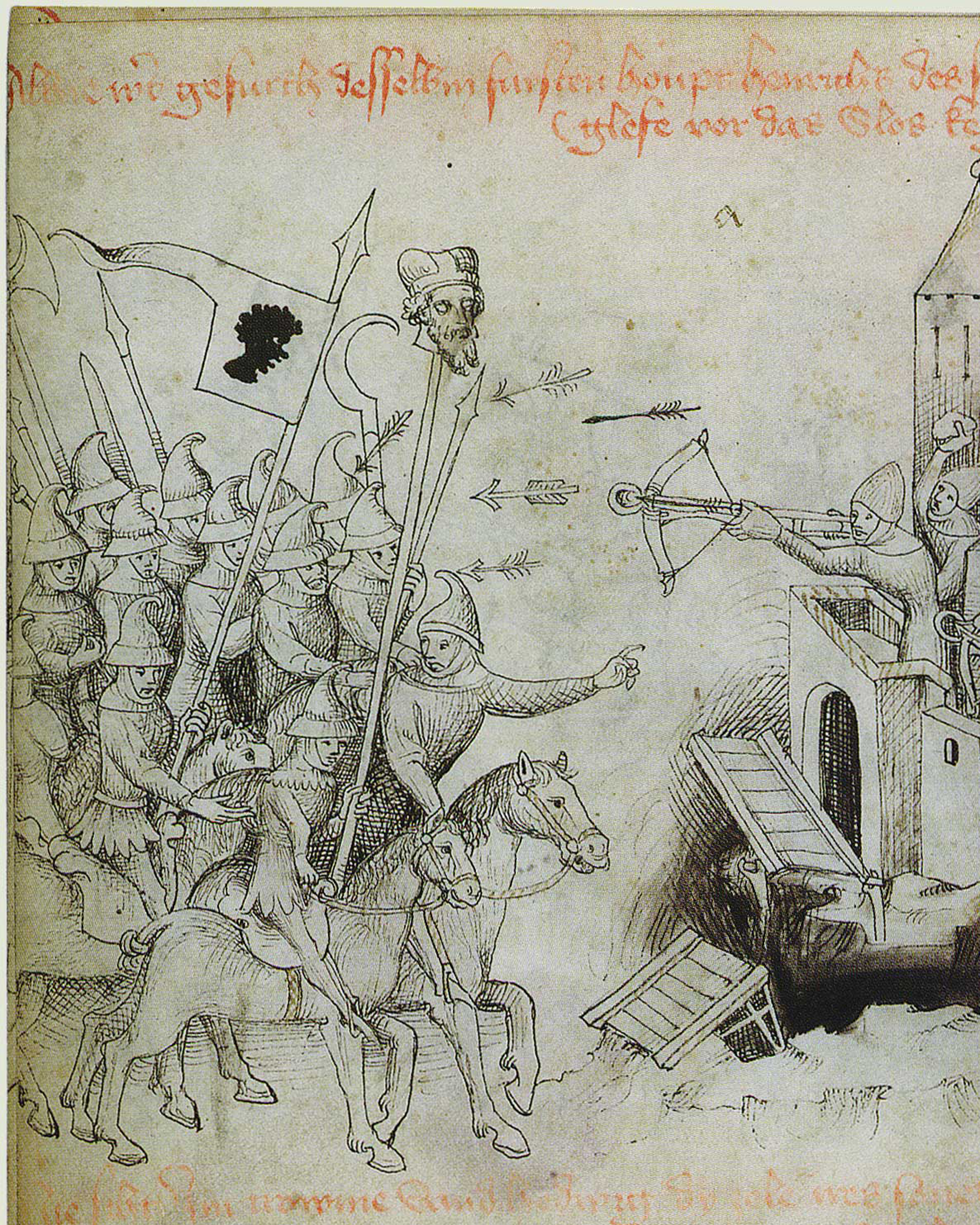
Baidar

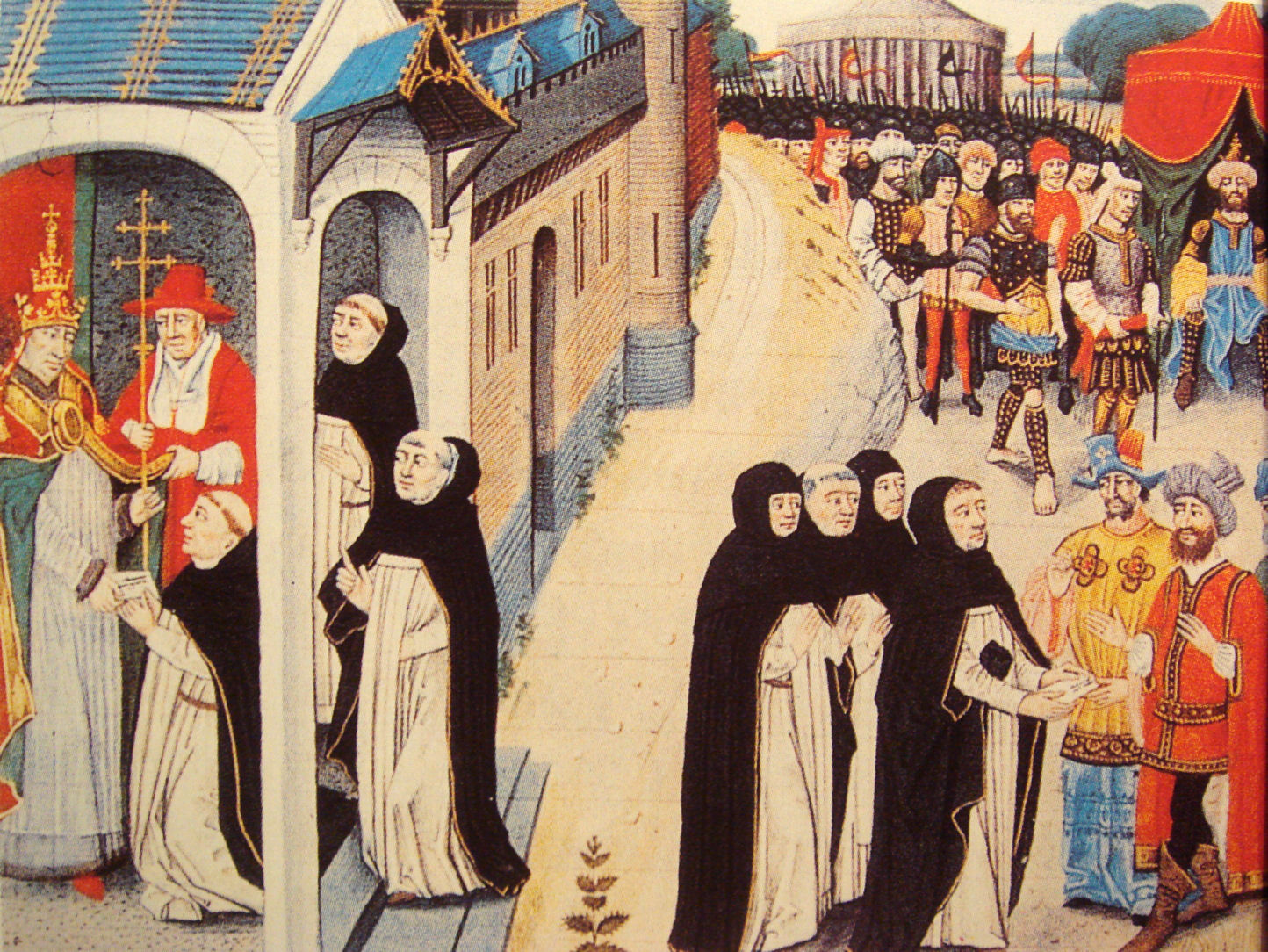
Baiju

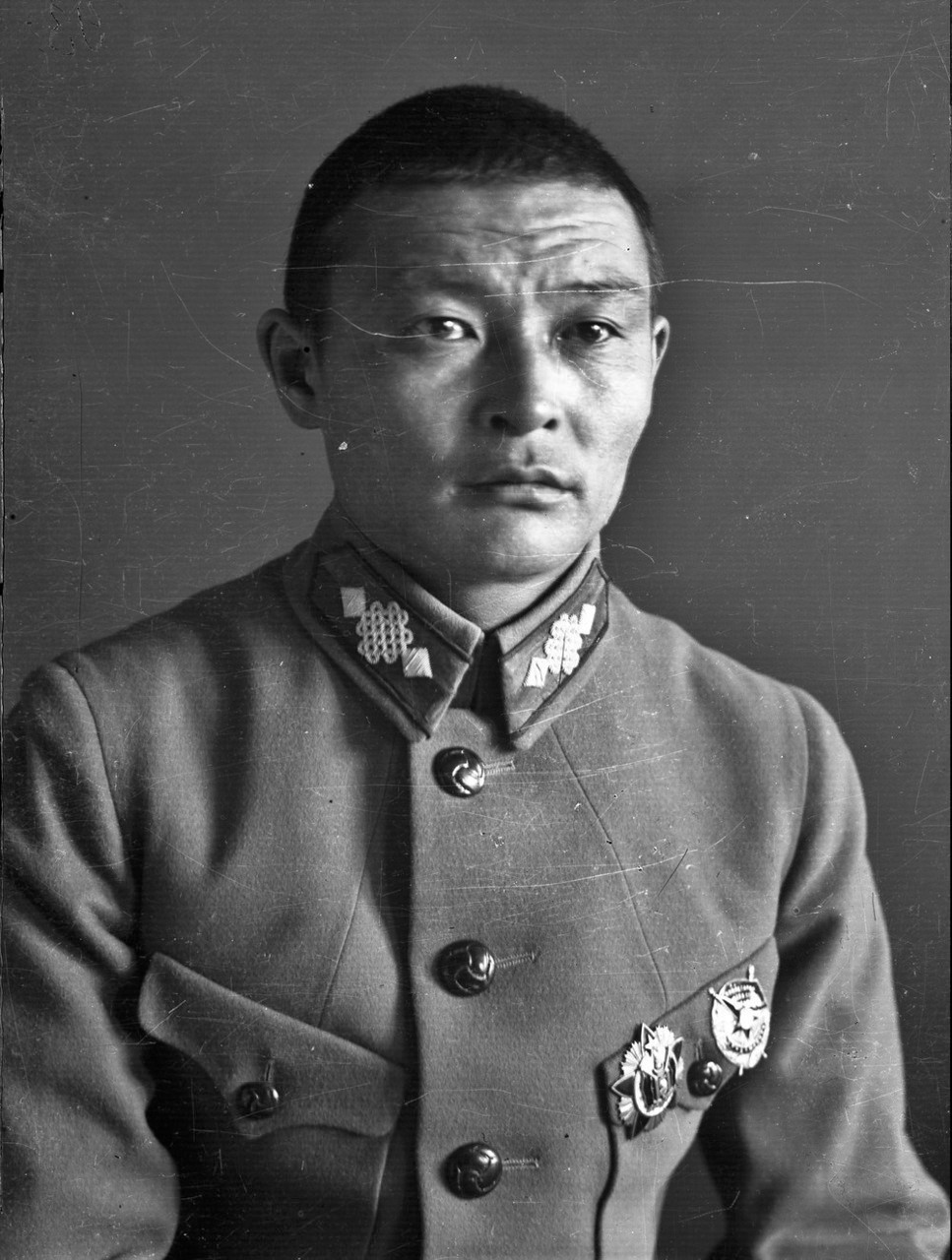
Choibalsan

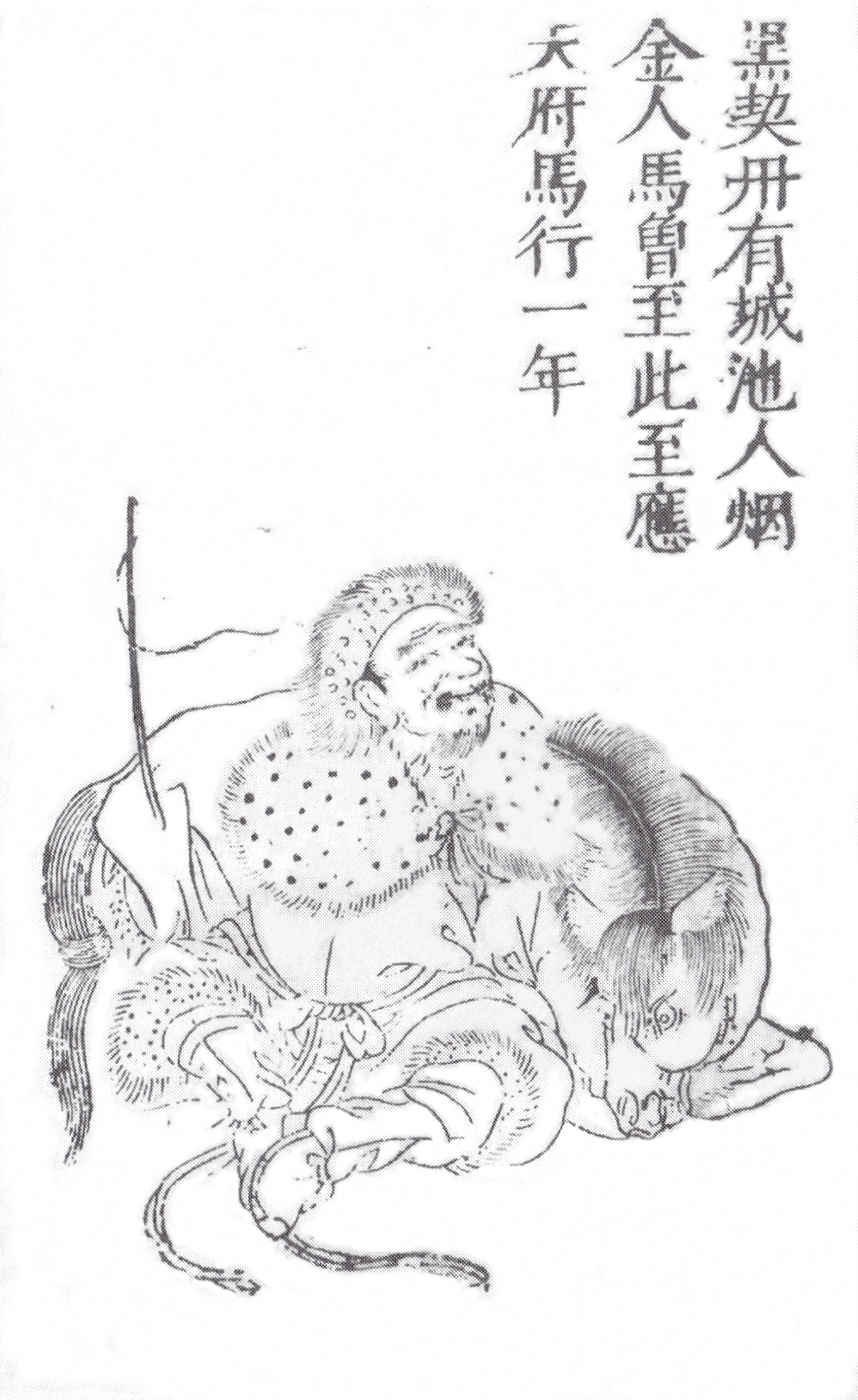
Dashi (Note: This isn't actually a depiction of Dashi but simply that of a Kara-Khitan man.)

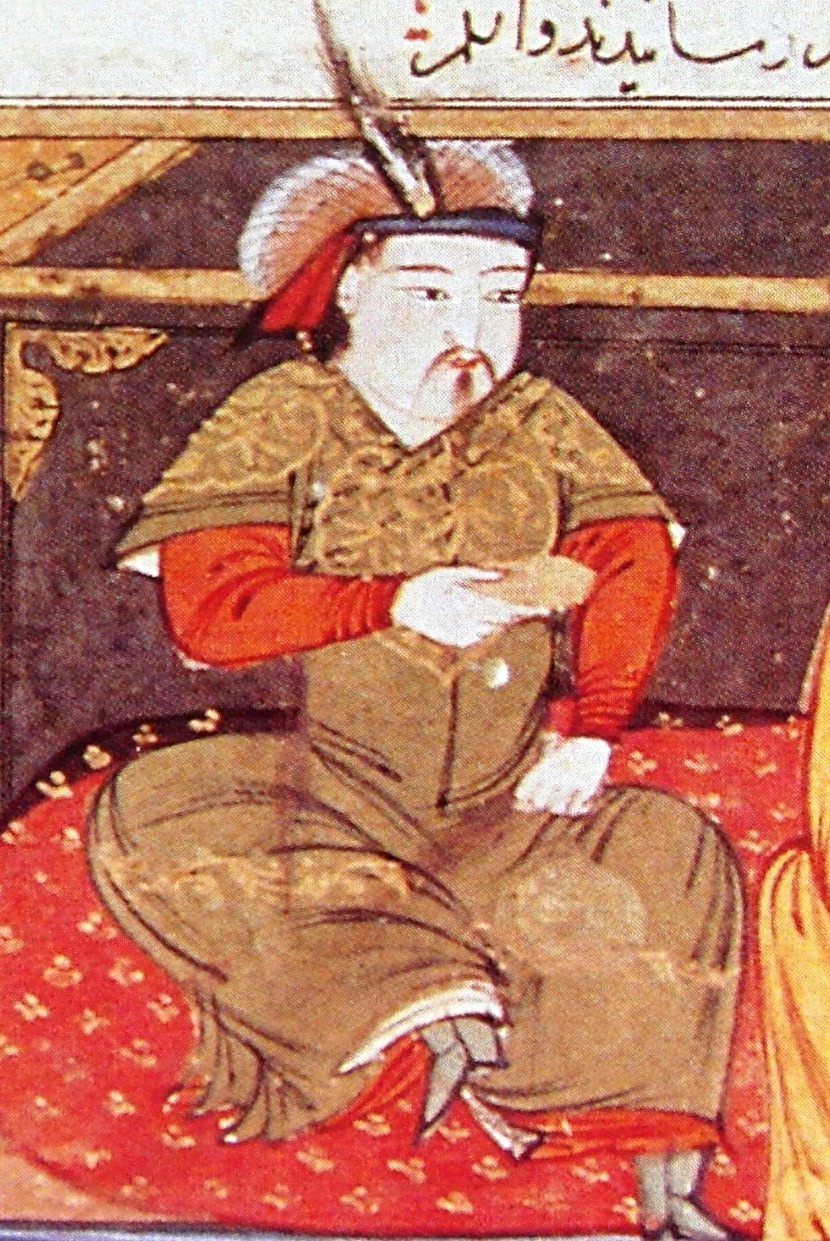
Hulagu

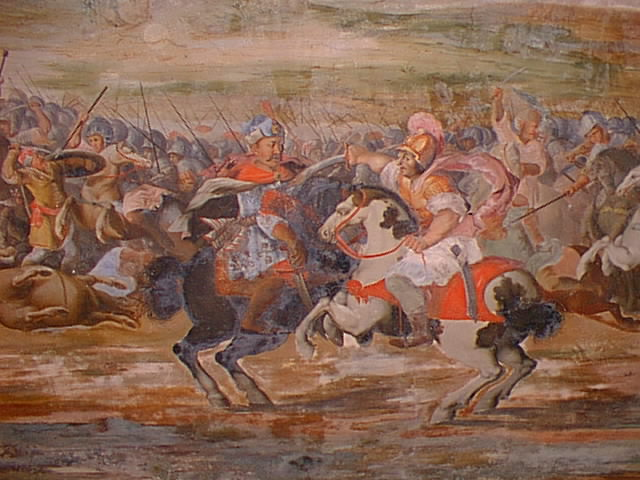
Kadan

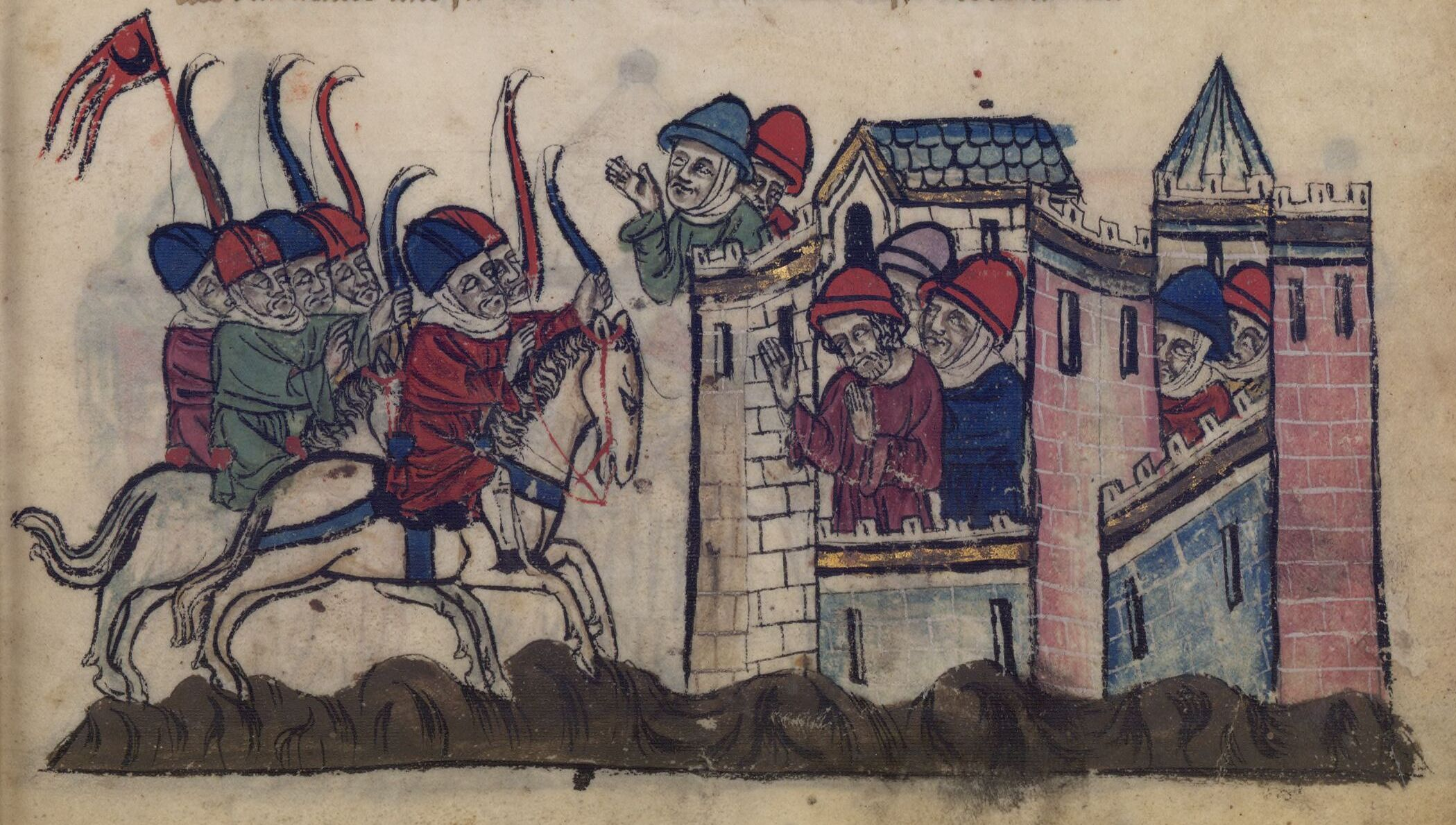
Kitbuqa

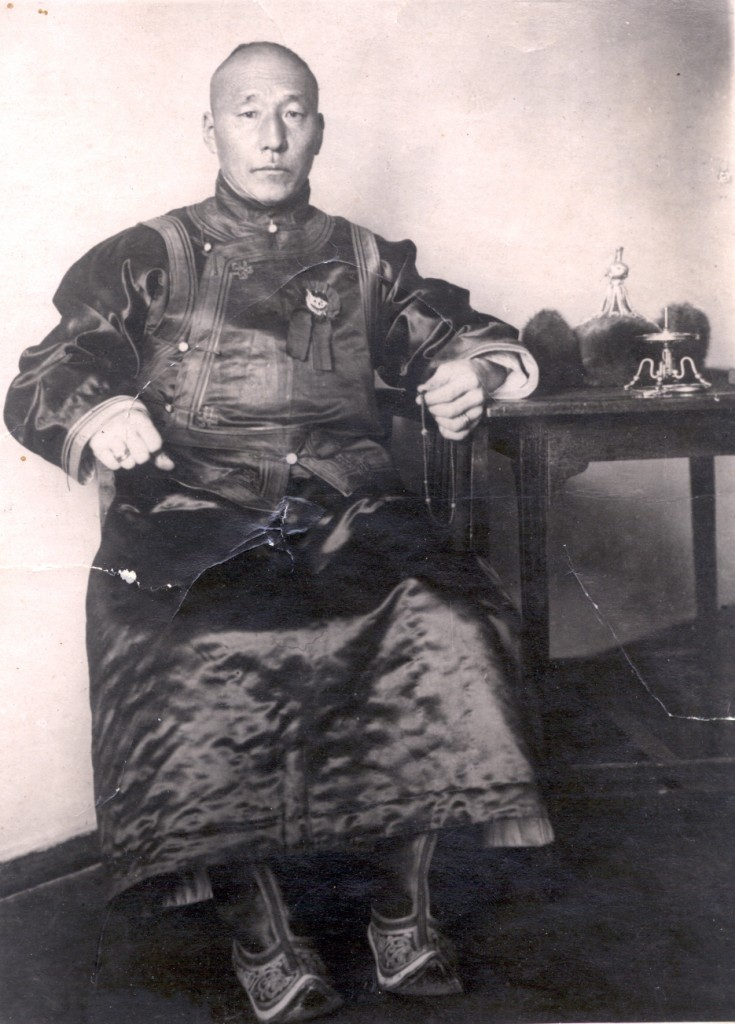
Magsarjav

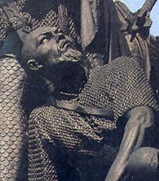
Mamai

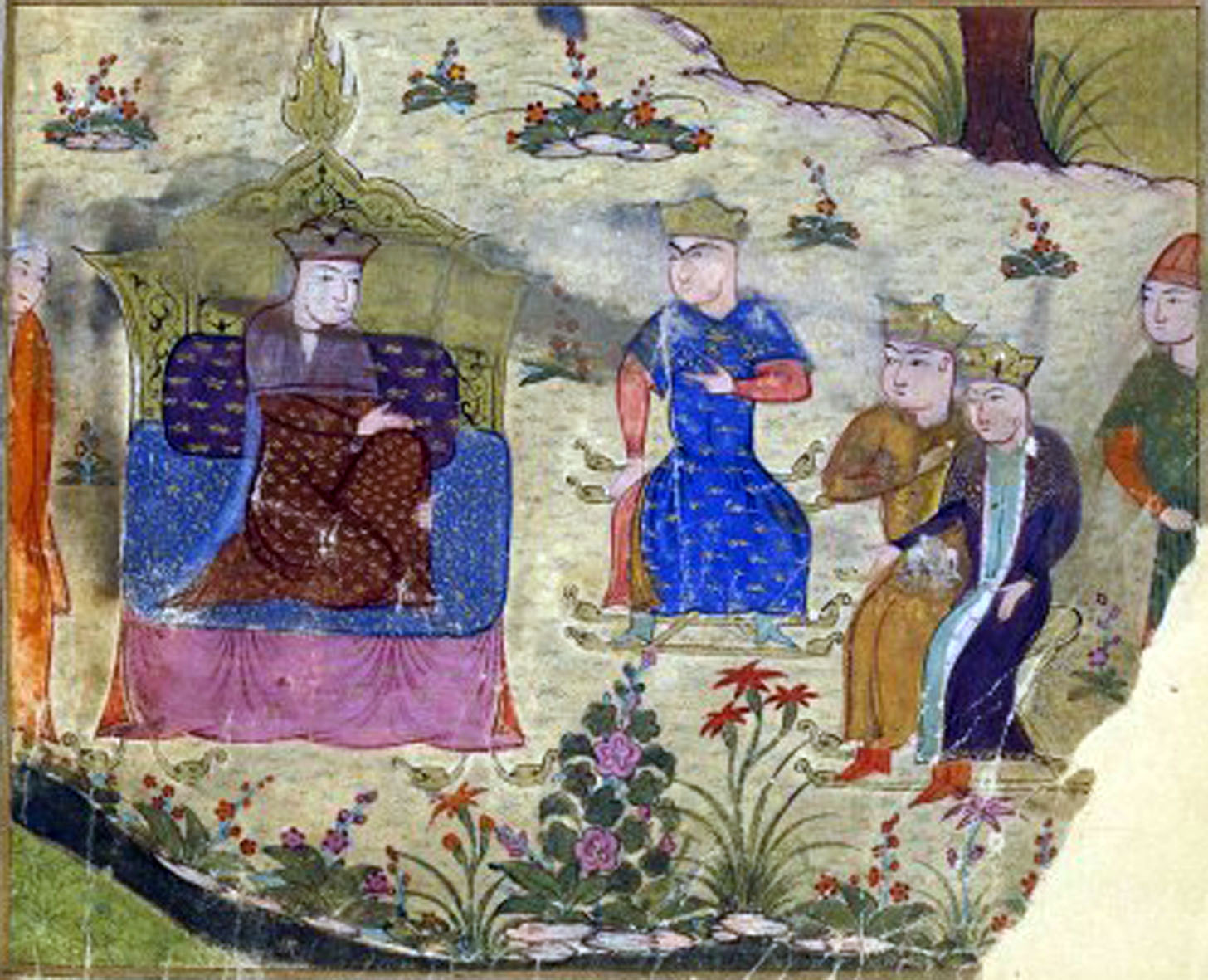
Munkhag

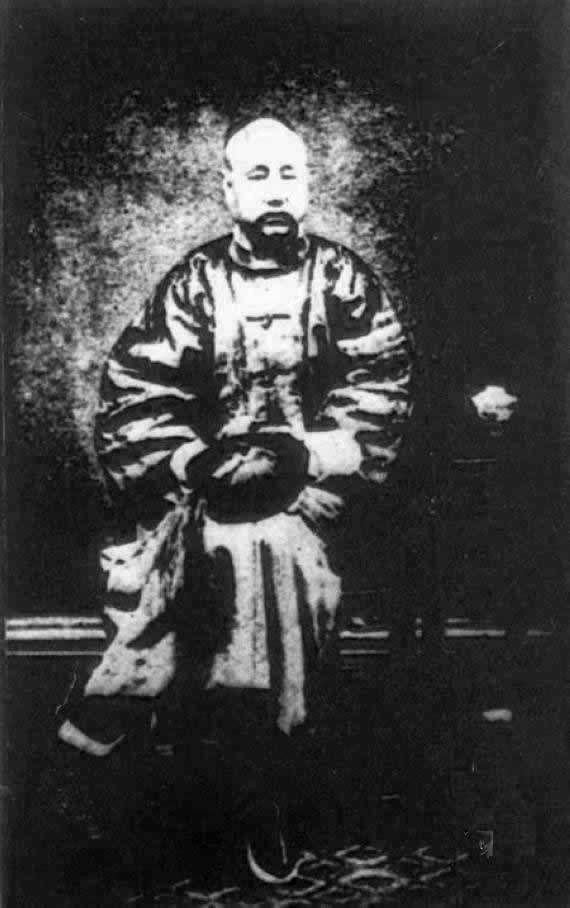
Rinchen

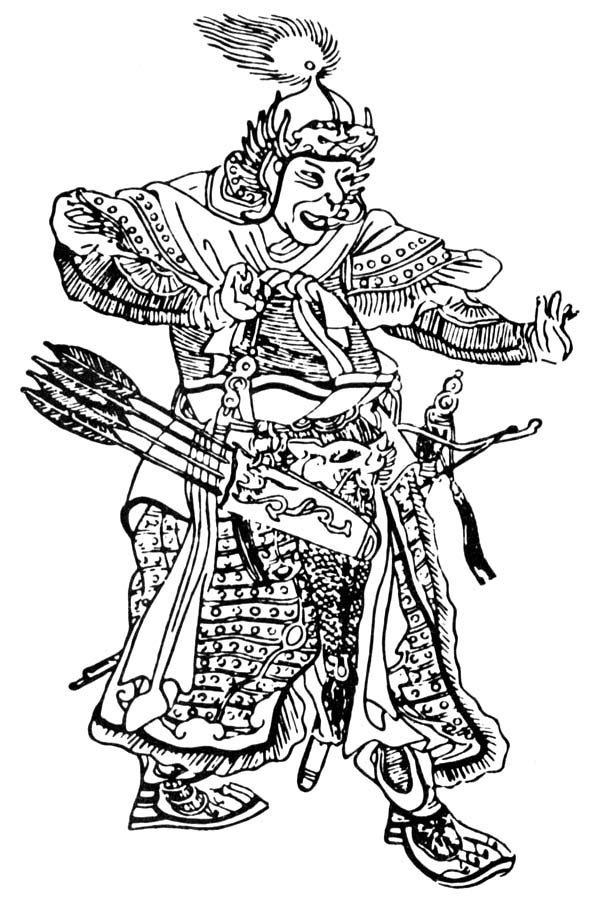
Subutai

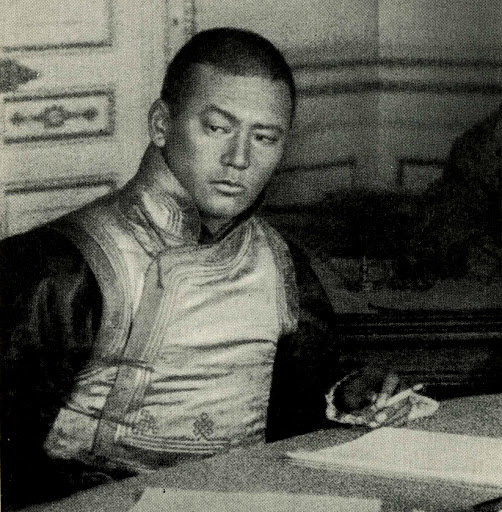
Sükhbaatar

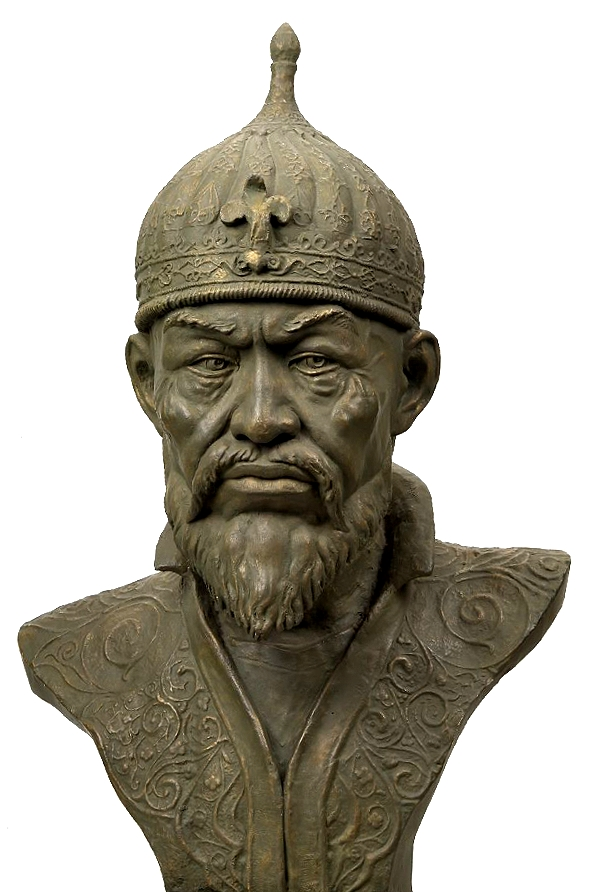
Timur

== Politicians (1900–present) ==
- Norovyn Altankhuyag (b. 1958), Deputy Prime Minister (2009–present).
- Anandyn Amar (1886–1941), leader of Mongolia (1932–1936).
- Erdeniin Bat-Üül (b. 1957), mayor of Ulaanbaatar city (2012–2016), politician, leader of Democratic Revolution of 1990.
- Bayanqolu (b. 1955), Chinese politician of Mongolian ethnicity, Governor of Jilin.
- Sanjaagiin Bayar (b. 1956), former Prime Minister (2007–2009).
- Bogd Khan (1869–1924), Khan of Mongolia (1911–1924).
- Losolyn Byambajargal (b. 1964), Social Democrat politician, anti-communist activist.
- Ajvaagiin Danzan (1895–1932), Mongolian spy, communist.
- Demchugdongrub (1902–1966), leader of the Japanese puppet state Mengjiang (1936–1945), Order of the Rising Sun.
- Tsakhiagiin Elbegdorj (b. 1963), President of Mongolia, leader of Democratic Revolution of 1990, Prime Minister of Mongolia.
- Nambaryn Enkhbayar (b. 1958), politician.
- Luvsangiin Erdenechuluun (b. 1948), Foreign Minister (2000–2004).
- Yun Gongmin (b. 1950), Chinese politician of Mongolian ethnicity, General Manager of China Huadian Corporation, Vice-Chairman of Shenhua Group and Vice Governor of Shanxi.
- Yang Jing (b. 1953), Chinese politician of Mongolian heritage, 12th Secretary General of the State Council.
- Ukhnaagiin Khurelsukh (b. 1968), Prime Minister (2017-present).
- Tsengeltiin Jigjidjav (1894–1933), Prime Minister of Mongolia (1930–1932).
- Vladimir Lenin (1870–1924), Russian politician and leader, partly of Kalmyk descent.
- Ider Luvsandanzan (born 1937), Mongolian diplomat (Note: Lenin never spoke of his origins, and other ethnicities have been proposed instead of Kalmyk.)
- Tögs-Ochiryn Namnansüren (1878–1919), aristocrat and Prime Minister of Mongolia (1912–1919).
- Serengdongrub (1894–1980), politician.
- Dumaagiin Sodnom (b. 1933), former Prime Minister of Mongolia (1984–1990).
- Yumjaagiin Tsedenbal (1916–1991), Prime Minister of Mongolia (1952–1974).
- Balingiin Tserendorj (1868–1928), Prime Minister of Mongolia (1923–1928).
- Ulanhu (Yun Ze) (1907–1988), nicknamed "Mongolian Viscount", Vice President of the People's Republic of China.
- Uyunqimg (b. 1942), Chinese politician of Mongolian ethnicity. Between 2008 and 2013 she served as a Vice-Chair of the Standing Committee of the National People's Congress.
- Yuriy Yekhanurov (b. 1948), Ukrainian politician of Buryat descent, 11th Prime Minister of Ukraine, former Minister of Defence and Minister of Economy of Ukraine.
- Fu Ying (b. 1953), Chinese diplomat and politician of Mongolian ethnicity, People's Republic of China Ambassador to the United Kingdom, the first woman to serve as Vice-Minister of Foreign Affairs since 1979 in China, and one of only two to serve.
- Sanjaasürengiin Zorig (1962–1998), leader of Democratic Revolution of 1990.
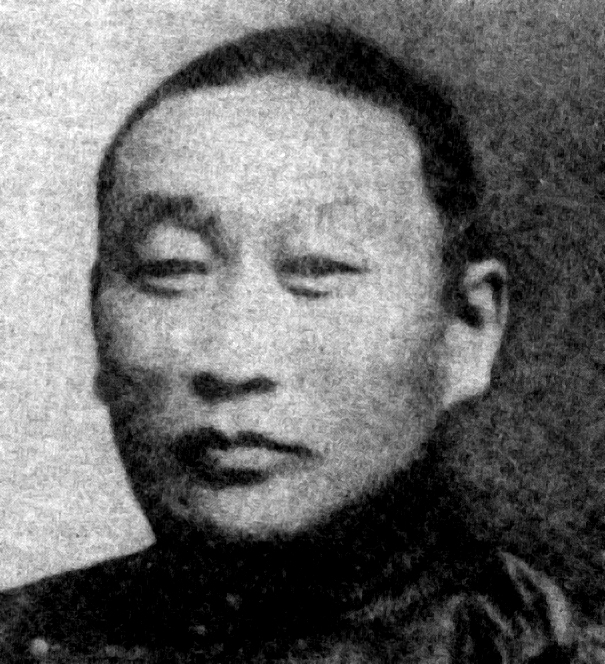
Amar

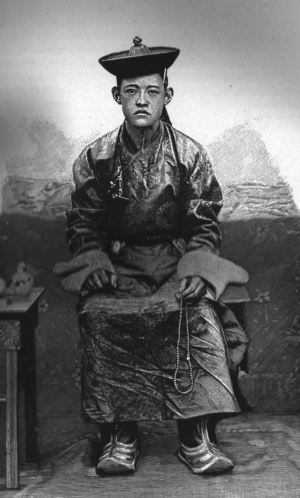
Bogd Khan

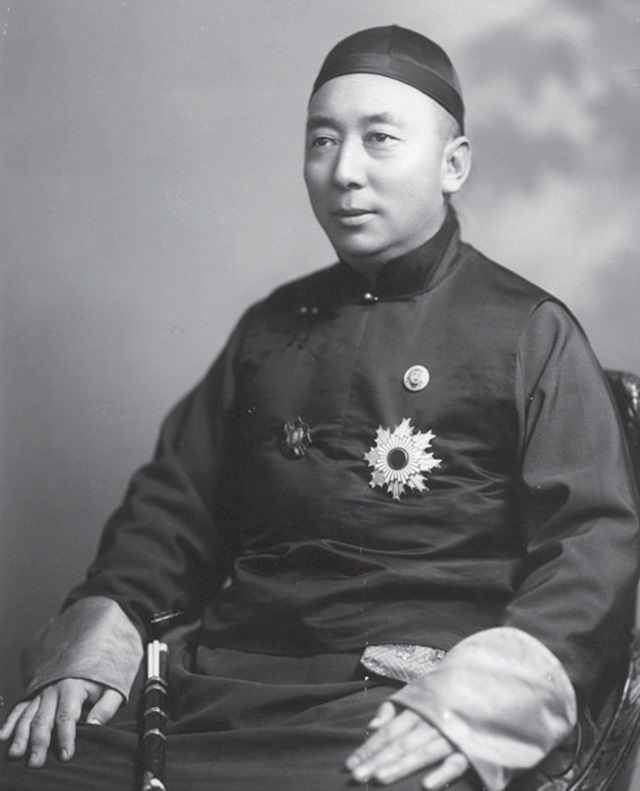
Demchugdongrub

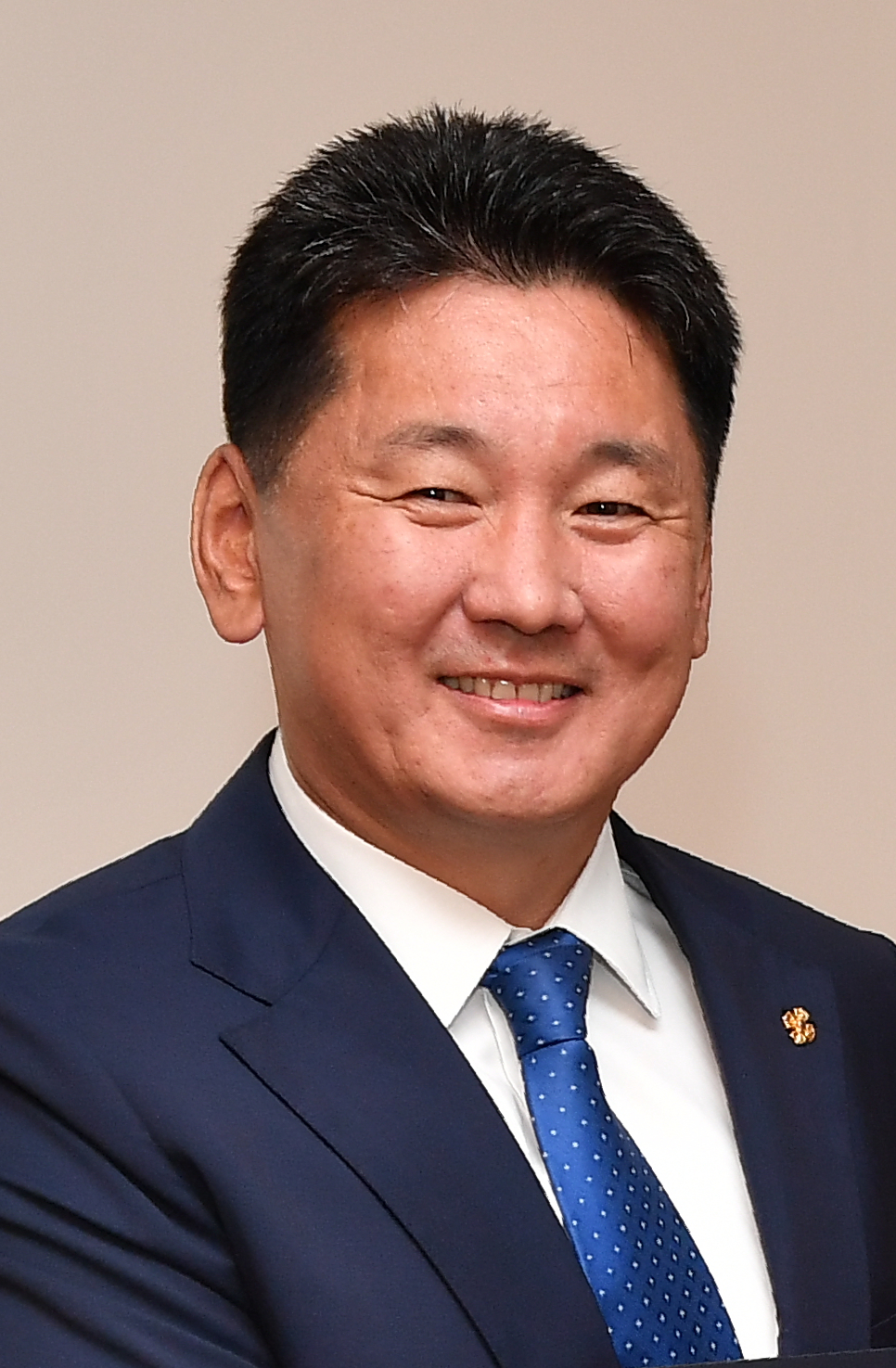
Khürelsükh

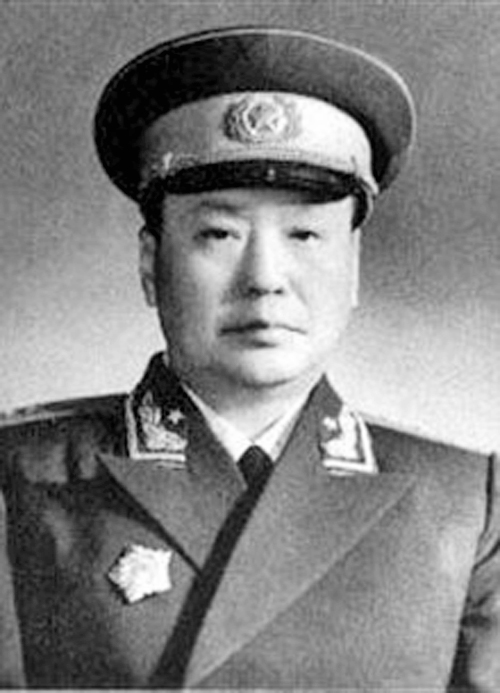
Ulanhu

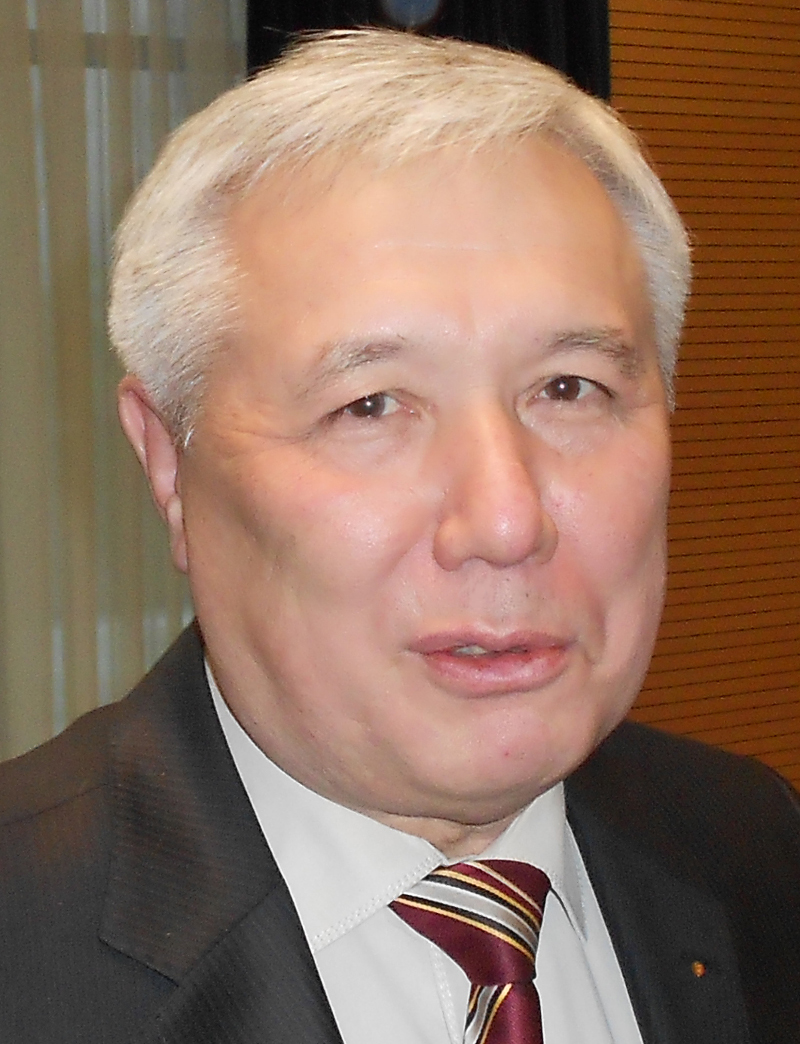
Yekhanurov

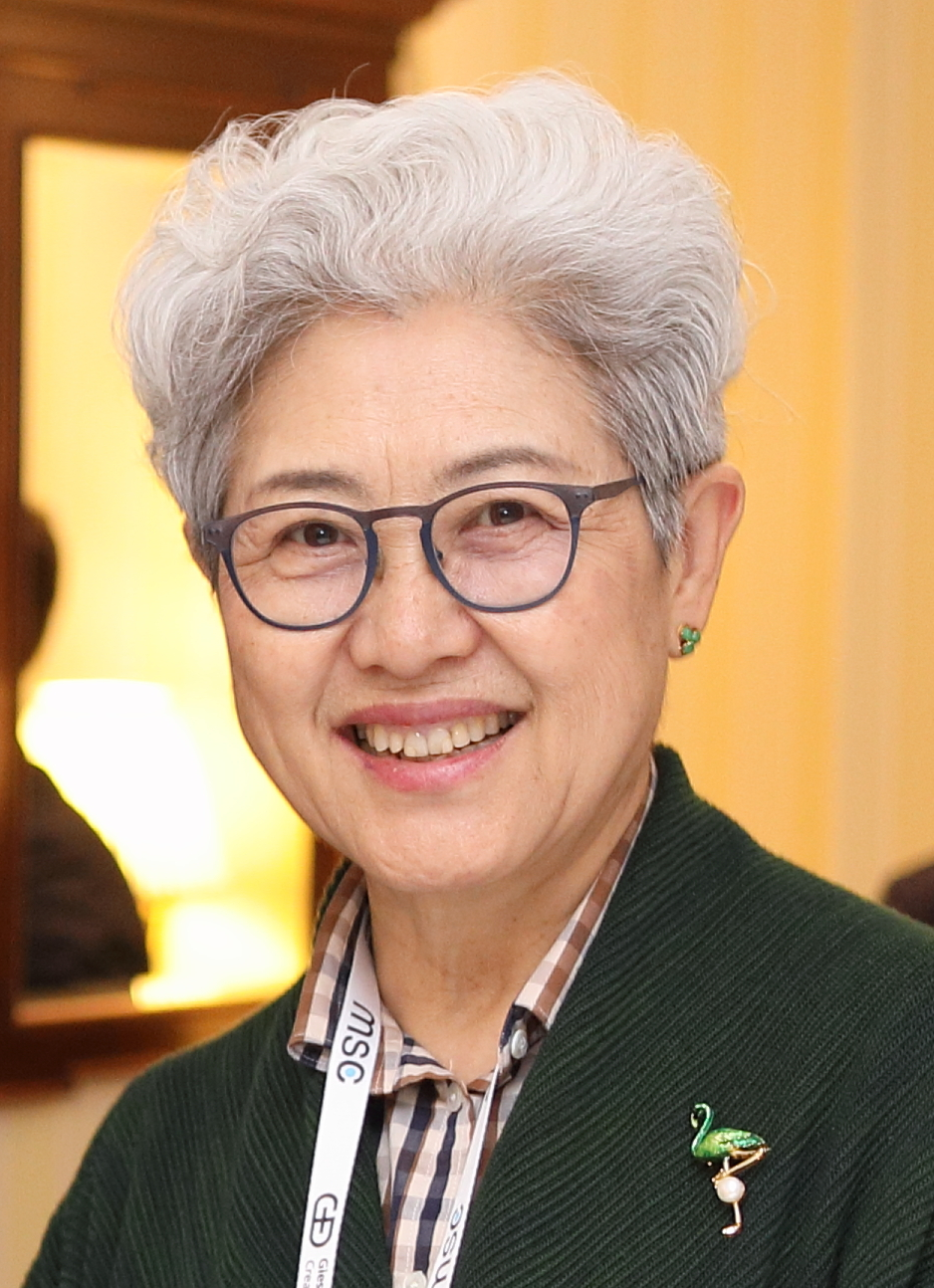
Ying

== Religious leaders ==
- 4th Dalai Lama, Yonten Gyatso (1589–1617), ethnic Mongol, the great-grandson of Altan Khan.
- Jalsan (1947–2013), politician, scholar, and Buddhist leader (tulku) of Mongol ethnicity active in China.
- Diluwa Khutugtu Jamsrangjab (1883–1965), Mongolian Khutugtu, a Tibetan Buddhist tulku, politician and Mongolian-American scholar.
- Lobsang Pelden Tenpe Dronme (1890–1957), the 7th Changkya Khutukhtu.
- Tsem Tulku Rinpoche (1965–2019), recognised tulku of Kalmyk descent, an incarnate lama of the Gelug school of Tibetan Buddhism, and the founder and spiritual guide of Kechara House Buddhist Association with its headquarters in Malaysia.
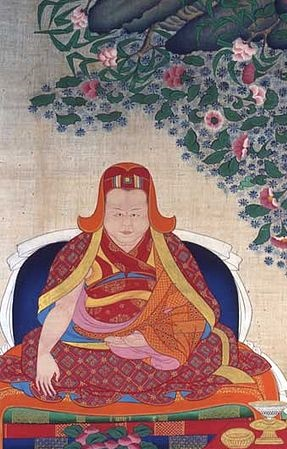
4th Dalai Lama

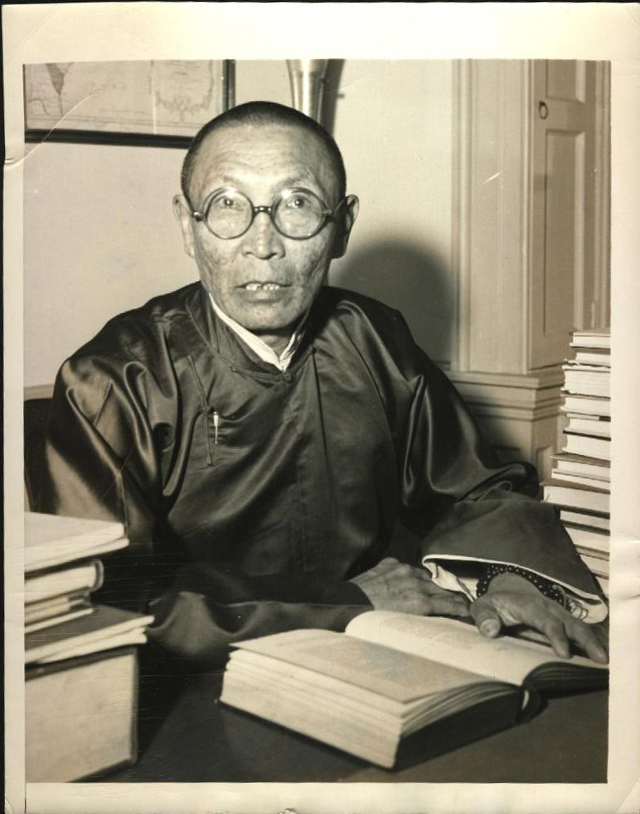
Jamsrangjab

== Empresses and queens ==
See also: List of Mongol khatuns
See also: List of Chinese imperial consorts
- Babusha (died 1330), Empress of China and Khatun of Mongols.
- Budashiri (born c. 1307–died c. 1340), Empress of China and Khatun of Mongols.
- Bulugan (fl. 1299), Empress of China and Khatun of Mongols.
- Erdeni Bumba (fl. 17th century), Empress of China during the Qing dynasty, of the Khorchin Mongol Borjigit clan.
- Börte (c. 1161–1230), Great Khatun of the Mongol Empire and Khamag Mongol, the first wife of Temüjin, who became Genghis Khan.
- Chabi (c. 1225–1281), Khatun of Mongols and Empress of China.
- Daliyetemishi (died 1368), Empress of China and Khatun of Mongols.
- Tsendiin Dondogdulam (1876–1923), Queen Consort of Mongolia, the wife of Bogd Khan. Her dress, and more generally the Mongolian imperial fashion of the early 20th century, inspired the iconic dress of Padmé Amidala in Star Wars: Episode I – The Phantom Menace.
- Bayan Khutugh (1324–1365), Empress of China and Khatun of Mongols.
- Mandukhai (c. 1449–1510), Khatun (queen) of the Northern Yuan dynasty.
- Nambui (fl. 1294), Empress of China and Khatun of Mongols.
- Radnashiri (died 1322), Empress of China and Khatun of Mongols.
- Shirindari (fl. 1294), Empress of China and Khatun of Mongols.
- Sugabala (died 1327), Empress of China and Khatun of Mongols.
- Empress Xiaoduanwen (1599–1649), Empress of China during the Qing dynasty, of the Khorchin Mongol Borjigit clan.
- Empress Xiaohuizhang (1641–1718), Empress of China during the Qing dynasty, of the Khorchin Mongol Borjigit clan.
- Empress Xiaozheyi (1854–1875), Empress consort of China during the Qing dynasty.
- Empress Dowager Xiaozhuang (1613–1688), Empress consort of China during the Qing dynasty.
- Xiao Yanyan (953–1009), Khitan empress and military leader of imperial China's Liao dynasty.
- Consort Yujiulü (d. 452), posthumously Empress Gong, Rouran consort of Tuoba Huang and mother of Wencheng.
- Empress Yujiulü (525–540), Rouran Empress of Western Wei.
- Zhenge (died 1327), Empress of China and Khatun of Mongols.
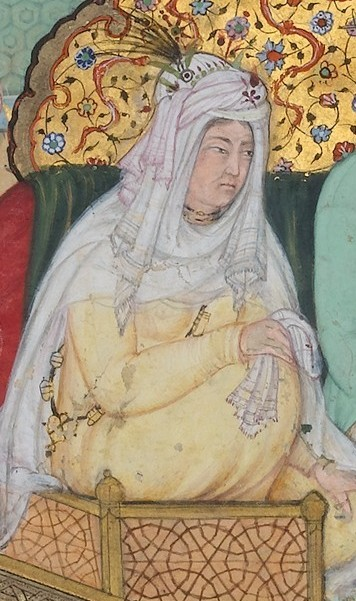
Börte

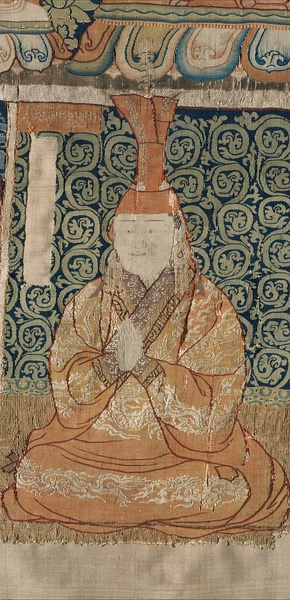
Budashiri

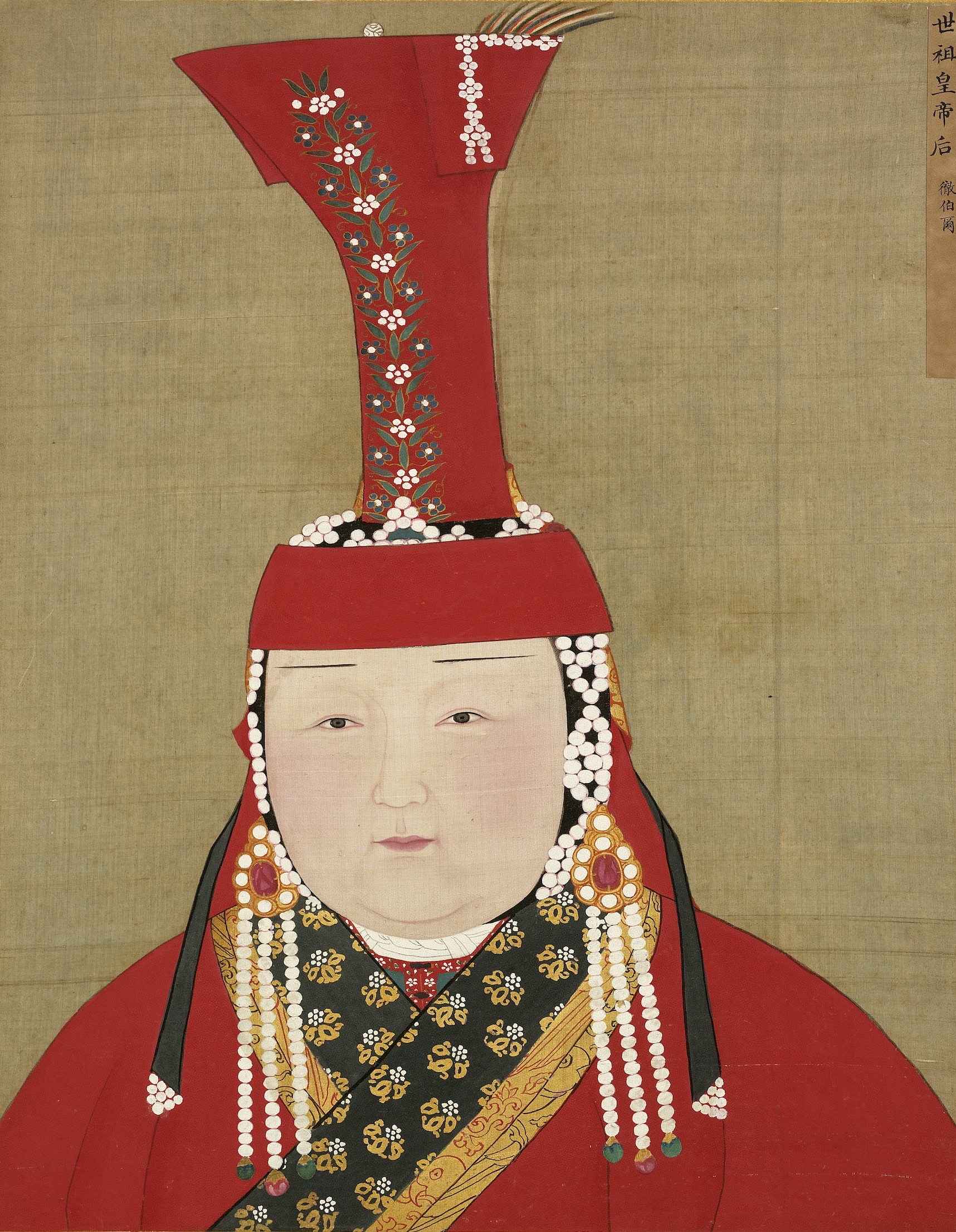
Chabi

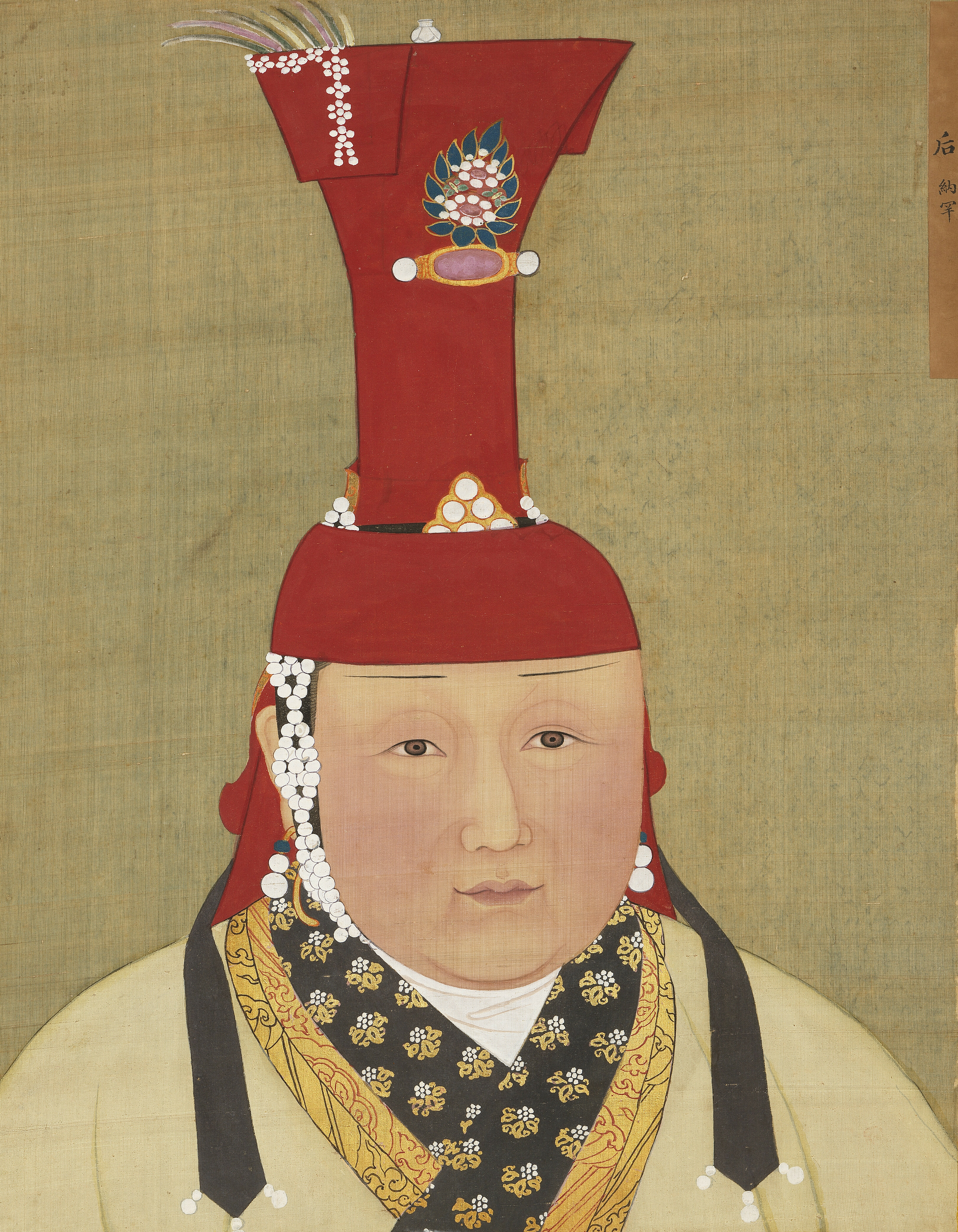
Nambui

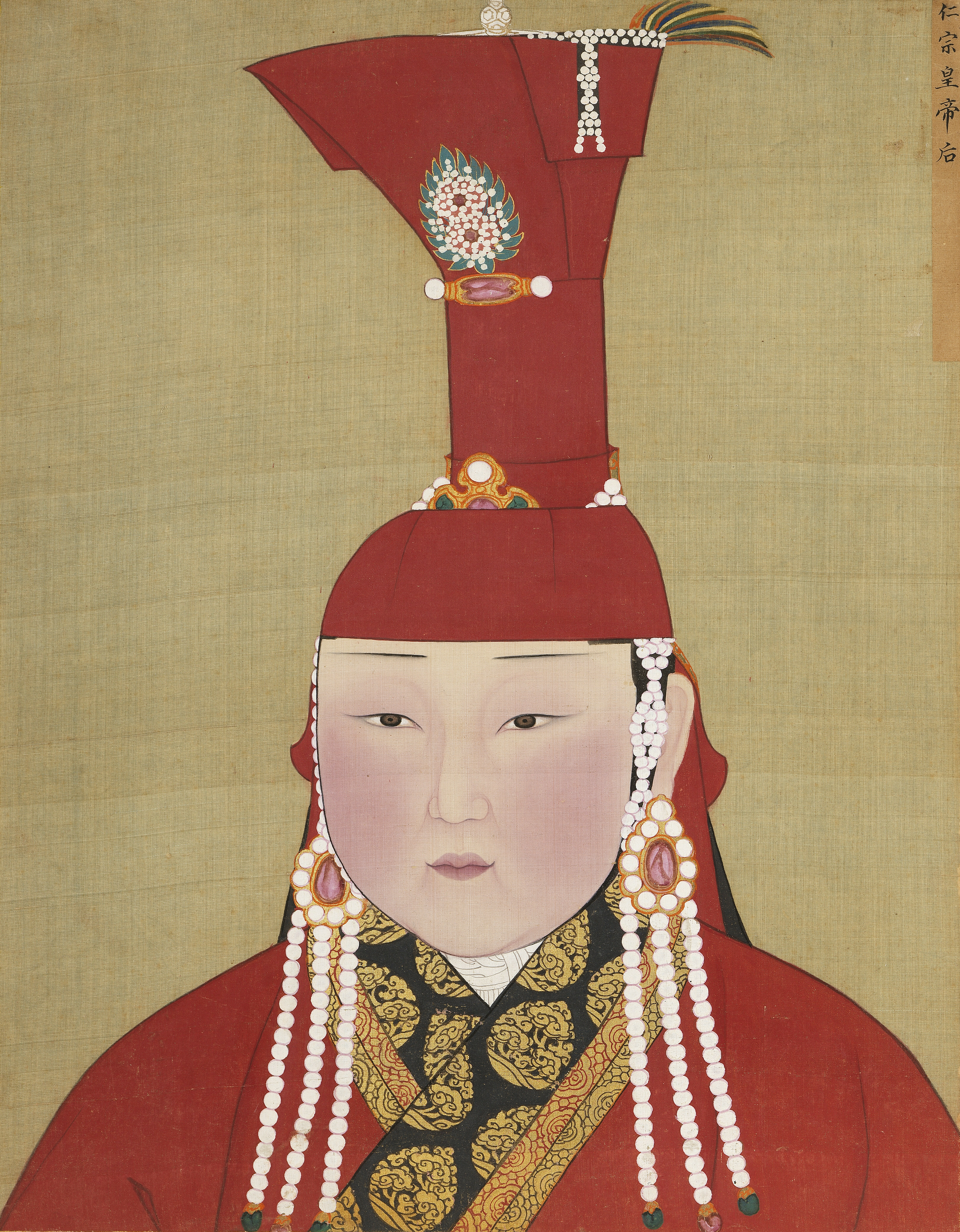
Radnashiri

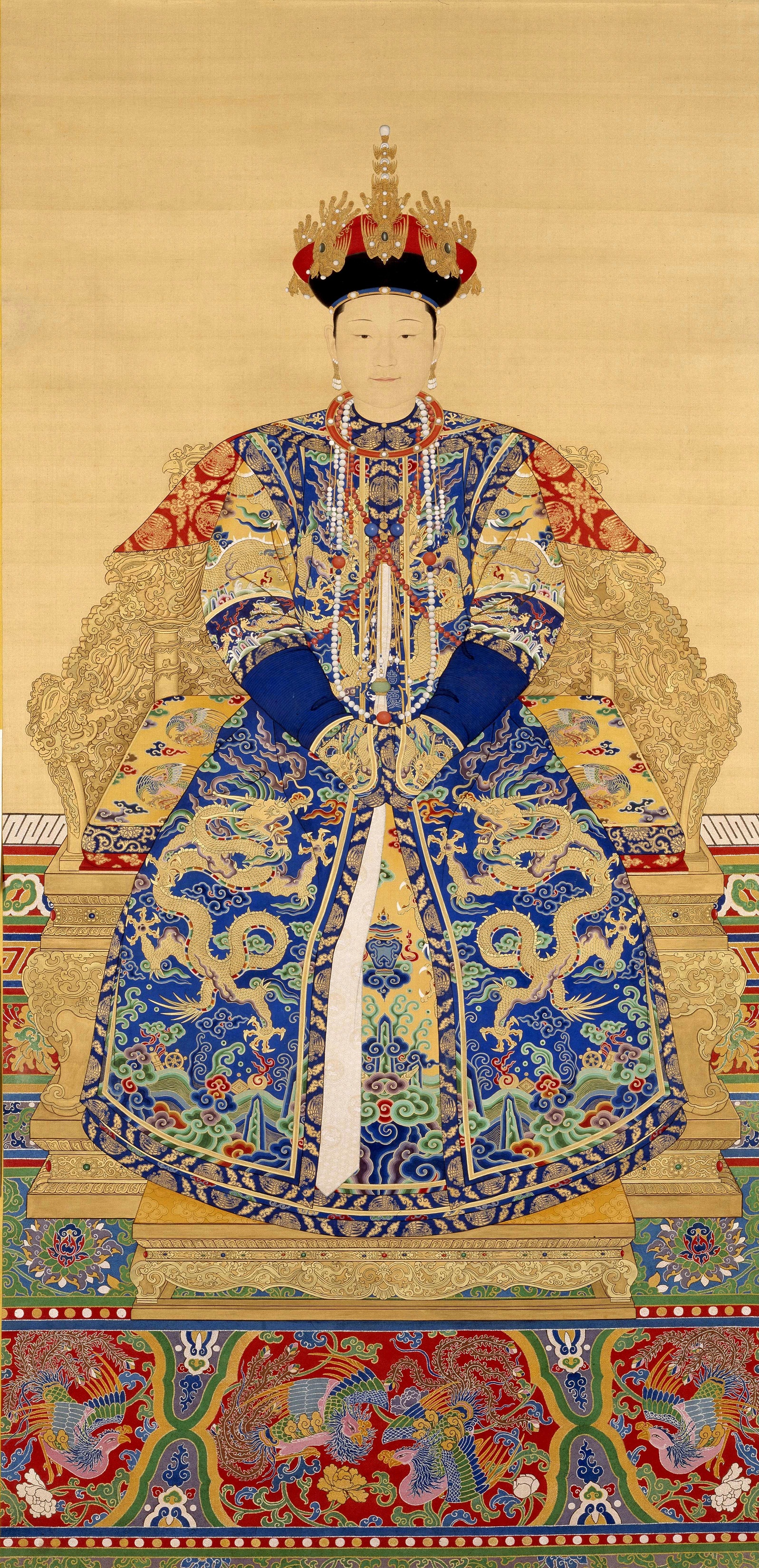
Xiaohuizhang

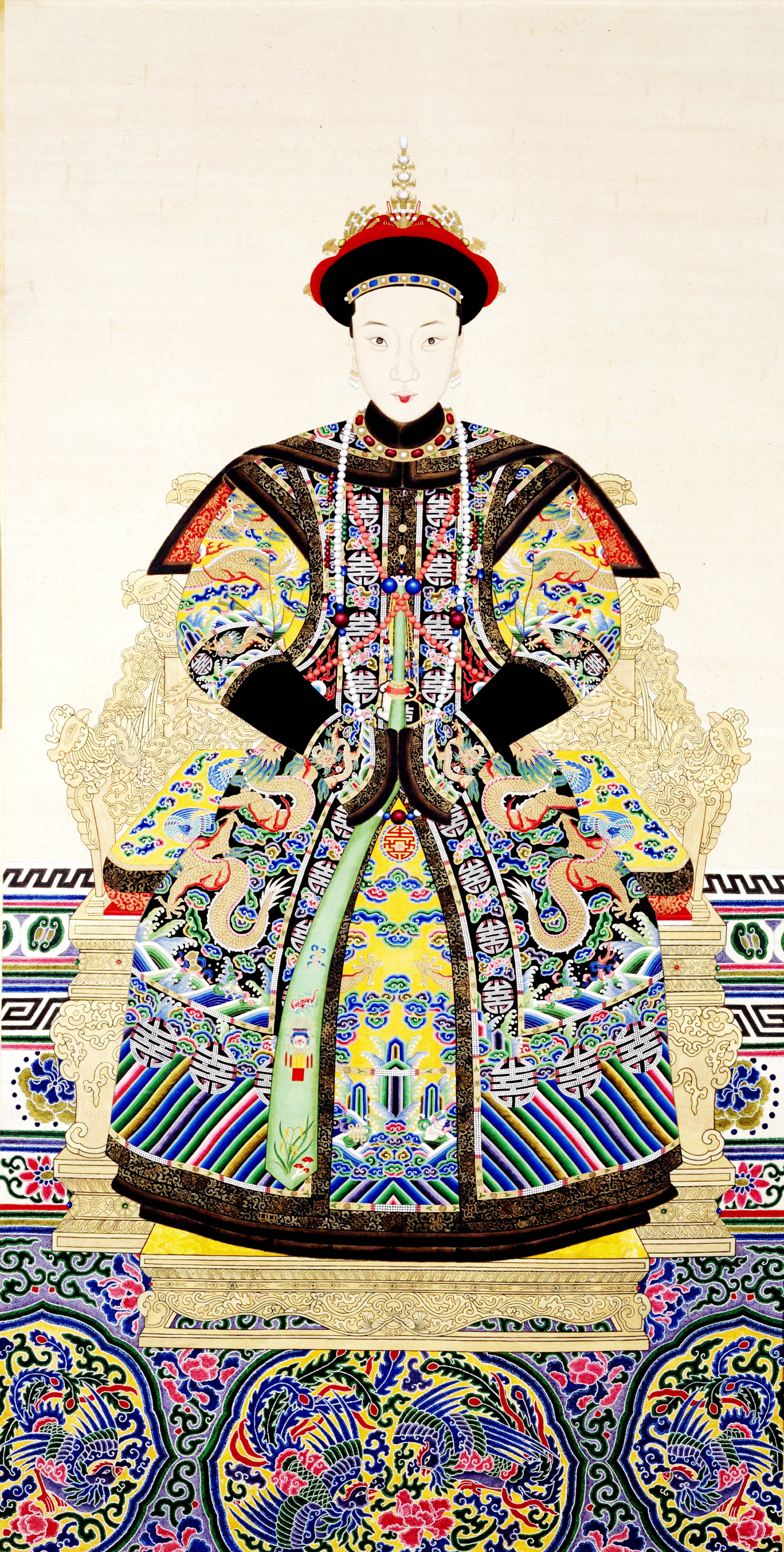
Xiaozheyi

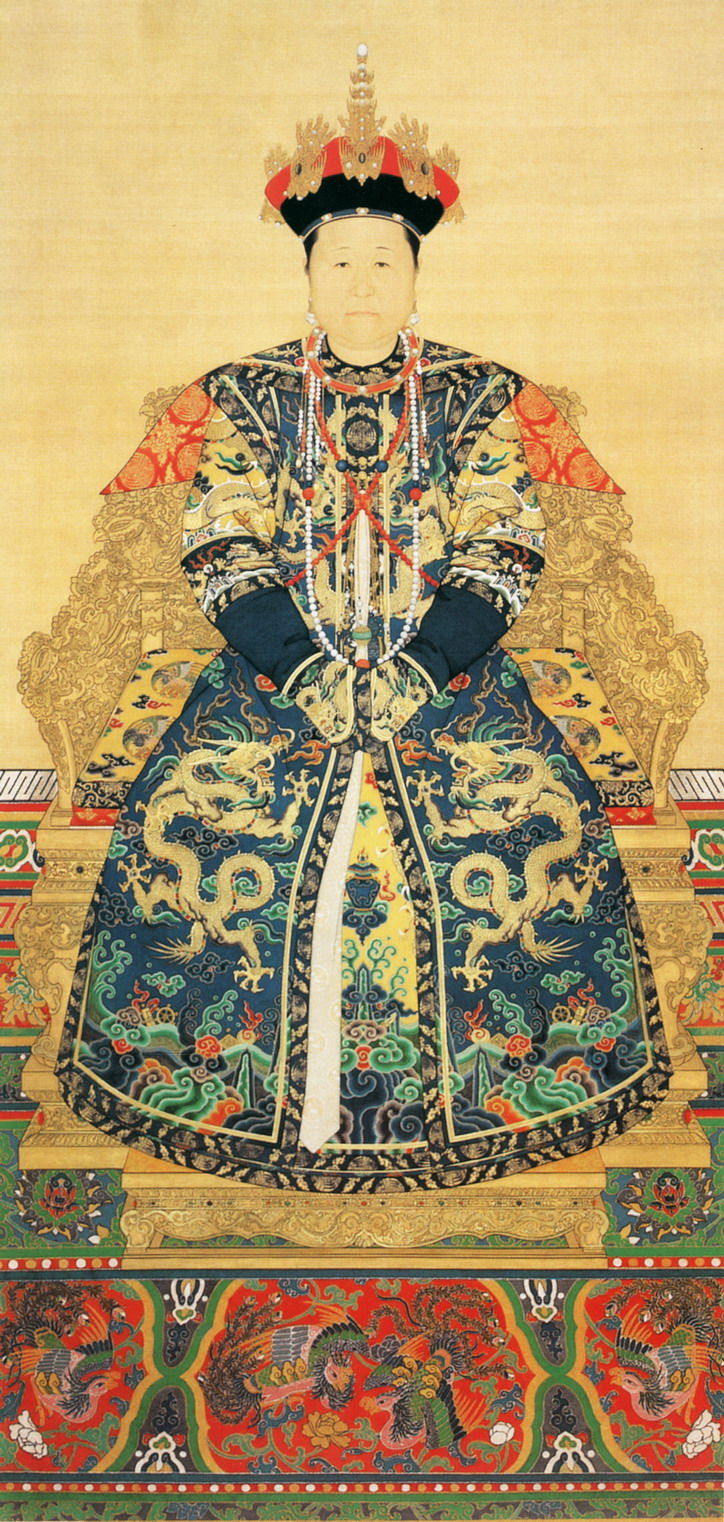
Xiaozhuang

== Rulers ==
=== Khamag Mongol (1120s–1206) ===
- Kaidu – first Khan to unite the Mongol clans
- Khabul Khan – first Khan of the Khamag Mongol confederation
- Ambaghai Khan
- Hotula Khan
- Yesugei (de facto)
- Genghis Khan

=== Mongol Empire (1206–1368) ===
==== Great Khans and Yuan dynasty ====
- Genghis Khan (1206–1227)
- Tolui Khan (as Regent) (1227–1229)
- Ögedei Khan (1229–1241)
- Töregene Khatun (as Regent) (1241–1246)
- Güyük Khan (1246–1248)
- Oghul Qaimish (as Regent) (1248–1251)
- Möngke Khan (1251–1259)
- Ariq Böke (1259–1264)
- Kublai Khan (1260–1294) – Khagan title: Setsen; Temple name: Shizu (1271–1294) Era name: Zhongtong (中統) (1260–1264); Zhiyuan (至元) (1264–1294)
- Temür Khan – Khagan title: Öljeitu; Temple name: Chengzong – (1294–1307); Era names: Yuanzhen (元貞) (1295–1297); Dade (大德) (1297–1307)
- Külüg Khan – Khagan title: Khülük; Temple name: Wuzong – (1308–1311); Era name: Zhida (至大) (1308–1311)
- Ayurbarwada Buyantu Khan – Temple name: Renzong – (1311–1320); Era names: Huangqing (皇慶) (1312–1313); Yanyou (延祐) (1314–1320)
- Gegeen Khan – Khagan title: Gegeen; Temple name: Yingzong – (1321–1323); Era name: Zhizhi (至治) (1321–1323)
- Yesün-Temür – Temple name: Taiding Di – (1323–1328); Era names: Taiding (泰定) (1321–1328); Zhihe (致和) 1328
- Ragibagh Khan – Temple name: Tianshun Di; Era name: Tianshun (天順) (1328)
- Jayaatu Khan Tugh Temür – Khagan title: Jayaaatu; Temple name: Wenzong – (1328–1329 / 1329–1332); Era names: Tianli (天歷) (1328–1330); Zhishun (至順) (1330–1332)
- Khutughtu Khan Kusala – Khagan title: Khutughtu; Temple name: Mingzong; Era name: Tianli (天歷) (1329)
- Rinchinbal Khan – Temple name: Ningzong; Era name: Zhishun (至順) (1332)
- Toghon Temür – Khagan title: Ukhaantu; Temple name: Huizong; Shundi – (1333–1370); Era names: Zhishun (至順) (1333); Yuantong (元統) (1333–1335); Zhiyuan (至元) (1335–1340); Zhizheng (至正) (1341–1368); Zhiyuan (至元) 1368–1370

==== Golden Horde ====
- Batu Khan (1227–1255)
- Sartaq (1255–56)
- Ulaghchi (1257)
- Berke (1257–1266)
- Mengu-Timur (1266–1282)
- Tuda Mengu (1282–1287)
- Talabuga (1287–1291)
- Toqta (1291–1312)
- Uzbeg Khan (1312–1341)
- Tini Beg (1341–1342)
- Jani Beg (1342–1357)
- Berdi Beg (1357–1361)
- Qulpa (1359–1360)
- Nawruz Beg (1360–1361)
- Khidr (1361–1362)
- Tulun Beg Khanum (1370–1373), actual ruler was Mamai
- Urus Khan (1376–1378), Urus was also Khan of the White Horde and uncle of Toqtamish, allowing the Hordes to unite.
- Toqtaqiya (1377)
- Timur-Malik (1377–1378)
- Tokhtamysh (1380–1395)
- Temür Qutlugh (1396–1401), actual ruler was Edigu
- Shadi Beg (1399–1407), actual ruler was Edigu
- Pulad (1407–1410), actual ruler was Edigu
- Jalal ad-Din khan (1411–1412)
- Jabbar Berdi (1417–1419)
- Olugh Mokhammad (1419–1421, 1428–1433)
- Dawlat Berdi (1419–1421, 1427–1432)
- Baraq (1422–1427)
- Seyid Akhmed (1433–1435)
- Küchük Muhammad (1435–1459)
- Mahmud (1459–1465)
- Ahmed (1465–1481)
- Murtada (1498–1499)

==== Left wing (White Horde) ====
- Orda (1226–1251)
- Qun Quran (1251–c.1280)
- Köchü (c.1280–1302)
- Buyan (Bayan) (1302–1309)
- Sasibuqa (1309–1315)
- Ilbasan (1315–1320)
- Mubarak Khwaja (1320–1344)
- Chimtay (1344–1374)
- Urus (1374–1376)
- Toqtaqiya (1376)
- Timur-Malik (1377)
- Tokhtamysh (1377–1378)
- Koiruchik (1378–1399)
- Baraq (1423–1428)

==== Right wing (Blue Horde) ====
- Batu Khan (1227–1255)
- Sartaq (1255–56)
- Ulaghchi (1257)
- Berke (1257–1266)
- Mengu-Timur (1266–1282)
- Tuda Mengu (1282–1287)
- Talabuga (1287–1291)
- Toqta (1291–1312)
- Öz Beg Khan (1312–1341)
- Tini Beg (1341–1342)
- Jani Beg (1342–1357)
- Berdi Beg (1357–1361)
- Qulpa (1359–1360)
- Nawruz Beg (1360–1361)
- Khidr (1361–1362)
- Timur Khwaja (1362)
- Abdallah (1362–1370), actual ruler was Mamai

==== Ilkhanate ====
- Hülëgü (1256–1265)
- Abaqa (1265–1282)
- Tekuder (1282–1284)
- Arghun (1284–1291)
- Gaykhatu (1291–1295)
- Baydu (1295)
- Ghazan (1295–1304)
- Öljaitü (1304–1316)
- Abu Sa'id (1316–1335)
- Arpa Ke'ün (1335–1336)
- Musa (1336–1337) (puppet of 'Ali Padshah of Baghdad)
- Muhammad (1336–1338) (Jalayirid puppet)
- Sati Beg (1338–1339) (Chobanid puppet)
- Sulayman (1339–1343) (Chobanid puppet, recognized by the Sarbadars 1341–1343)
- Jahan Temür (1339–1340) (Jalayirid puppet)
- Anushirwan (1343–1356) (non-dynastic Chobanid puppet)
- Ghazan II (1356–1357) (known only from coinage)
- Togha Temür (c. 1338–1353) (recognized by the Kartids 1338–1349; by the Jalayirids 1338–1339, 1340–1344; by the Sarbadars 1338–1341, 1344, 1353)

==== Chagatai Khanate ====
- Chagatai Khan 1226–1242
- Qara Hülëgü 1242–1246 d. 1252
- Yesü Möngke 1246–1252
- Qara Hülëgü (restored) 1252
- Mubarak Shah 1252–1260
  - Orghana Khatun (fem.), regent 1252–1260
- Alghu 1260–1266
- Mubarak Shah (restored) 1266
- Baraq 1266–1270
- Negübei 1270–c. 1272
- Buqa Temür c. 1272–1287
- Duwa 1287–1307
- Könchek 1306–1308
- Taliqu 1308–1309
- Kebek 1309 d. 1325
- Esen Buqa I 1309–c. 1318
- Kebek (restored) c. 1318–1325
- Eljigidey 1325–1329
- Duwa Temür 1329–1330
- Aladdin Tarmashirin 1331–1334
- Buzan 1334–1335
- Changshi 1335–1338
- Yesun Temur c. 1338–c. 1342 with...
- 'Ali-Sultan 1342
- Muhammad I ibn Pulad 1342–1343
- Qazan Khan ibn Yasaur 1343–1346
- Danishmendji 1346–1348

==== Moghulistan (Eastern Chagatai Khanate) ====
- Bayan Qulï 1348–1358
- Shah Temür 1358
- Tughlugh Timur (in Mogulistan 1348–1363) 1358–1363
- Ilyas Khodja (in Mogulistan 1363–1368) 1363–1368
- Adil-Sultan 1363
- Khabul Shah 1364–1370
- Suurgatmish 1370–1388
- Sultan Mahmud (Mohammed II) 1388–1402

=== Northern Yuan dynasty (1368–1634) ===
- Toghon Temür (1368–1370)
- Biligtü Khan Ayushiridara (1370–1378)
- Uskhal Khan Tögüs Temür (1378–1388)
- Jorightu Khan Yesüder (1388–1391)
- Engke Khan (1391–1394)
- Elbeg Nigülesügchi Khan (1394–1399)
- Gün Temür Khan (1400–1402)
- Örüg Temür Khan (Guilichi) – non-chingisid
- Öljei Temür Khan (Bunyashiri) (1403–1412)
- Delbeg Khan (Dalbag) (1415)
- Oyiradai (1415–1425)
- Adai Khan (1425–1438)
- Tayisung Khan Toghtoa Bukha (1433–1452)
- Agbarjin (1453)
- Esen taishi – the leader of the Oirats (1453–1454)
- Markörgis Khan (Ükegtü) (1454–1465)
- Molon Khan (1465–1466)
- Manduul Khan (1475–1478)
- Dayan Khan (Batu Möngke) (1478–1516)
- Bars Bolud Jinong (deputy)
- Bodi Alagh Khan (1516–1547)
- Daraisung Guden Khan (1547–1557)
- Tümen Jasagtu Khan (1557–1592)
- Buyan Sechen Khan (1592–1604)
- Ligdan Khan (1604–1634)

=== Genghisid Setsen Khans of Eastern Mongolia (1627–1922) ===
- Batmunkh Dayan Khaan /1464–1543/, 29th Great Khan and descendant of Genghis Khan (1162–1227) through Kubilai Khan.
- Navaanneren /1910–1922/, eldest son of Tserendondov, who was the son of Orjinjav the son of Artased.

=== Oriats ===
==== Four Oirat (1399–1634) ====
- Ugetchi Khashikha (c. 1399)
- Esen (1438–1454)

==== Dzungar Khanate ====
- Khara Khula (d. 1634)
- Baatur Khung-Taiji (1634–1653)
- Sengge (1653–1670)
- Galdan Boshugtu Khan (1670–1697)
- Tsewang Arabtan (1694–1727)
- Galdan Tseren Khan (1727–1745)
- Tsewang-Dorji-Namjil (1746–1749)
- Lamdarja (1749–1752)
- Dawachi (1752–1755)

==== Khans of Khoshut Khanate ====
- Güshi Khan Toro-Baikhu (1642–1655)
- Dayan Ochir Khan (1655–1669)
- Lhazang Chingis Khan (1698–1717)

==== Torghud khans of the Kalmyk Khanate ====
- Kho Orluk (d. 1644)
- Ayuka Khan (1669–1724)
- Ubashi Khan (1762–1771)

=== Mongolia (1911–24) ===
- Bogd Khan (r. 1911–19, 1921–24) – Era name: Olnoo Örgögdsön (1911–1924); (the 8th Jebtsundamba Khutuktu) – Tibetan Spiritual head of Mongolian's Geluk Sect.
Genghis Khan

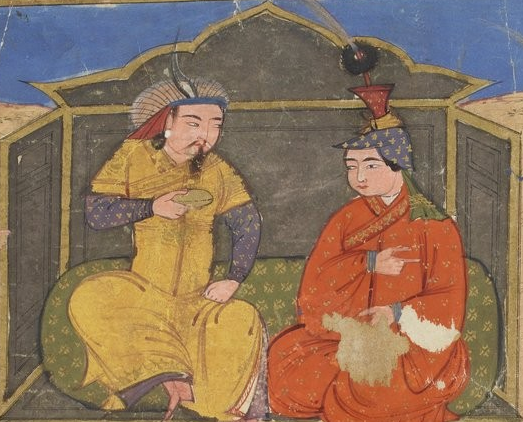
Abaqa

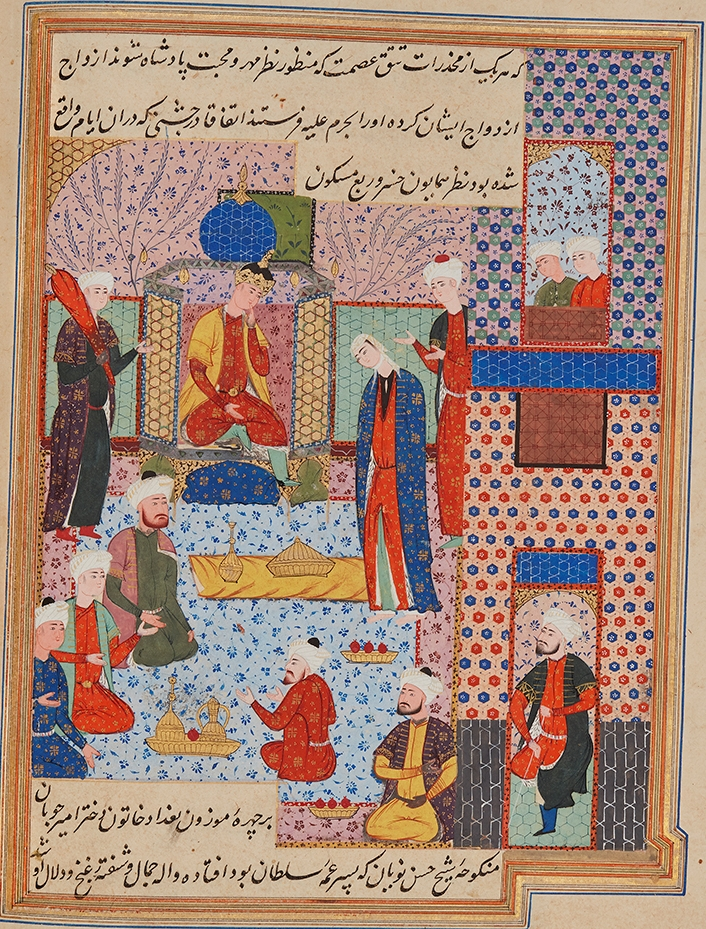
Abu Sa'id

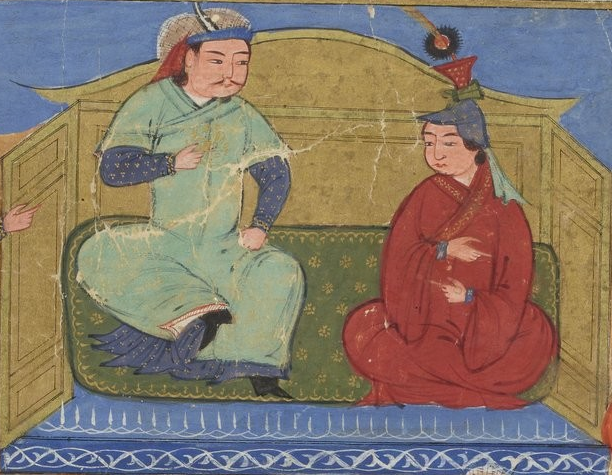
Arghun

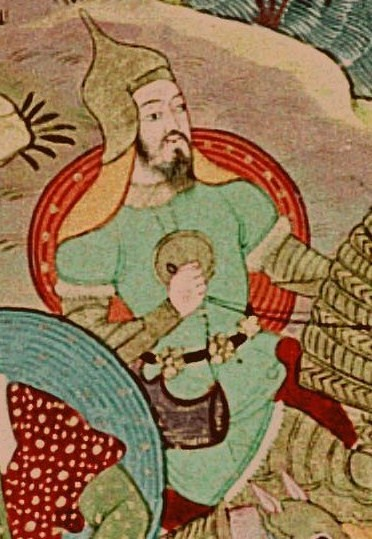
Ariq

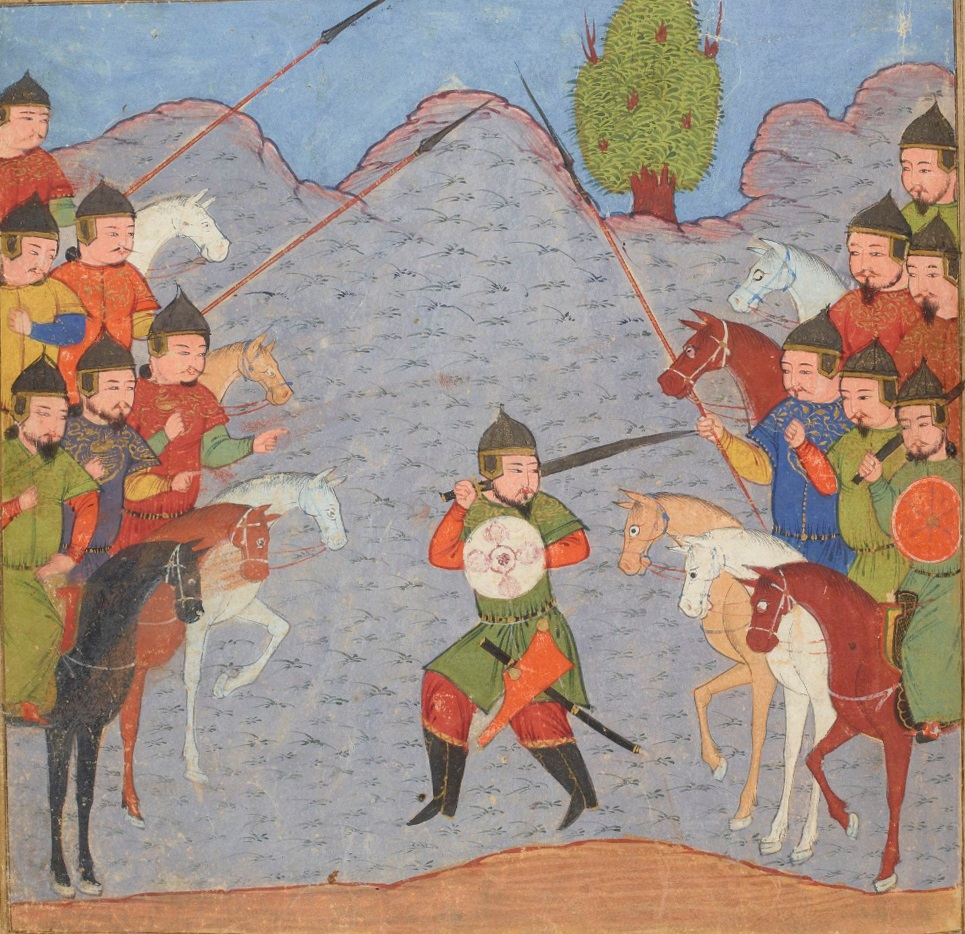
Baydu

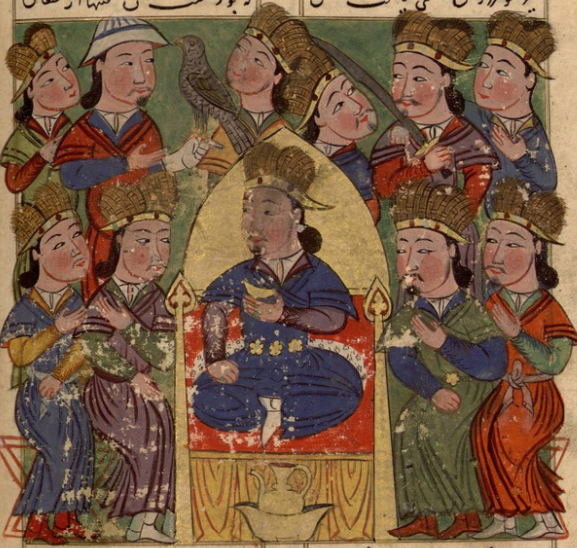
Gaykhatu

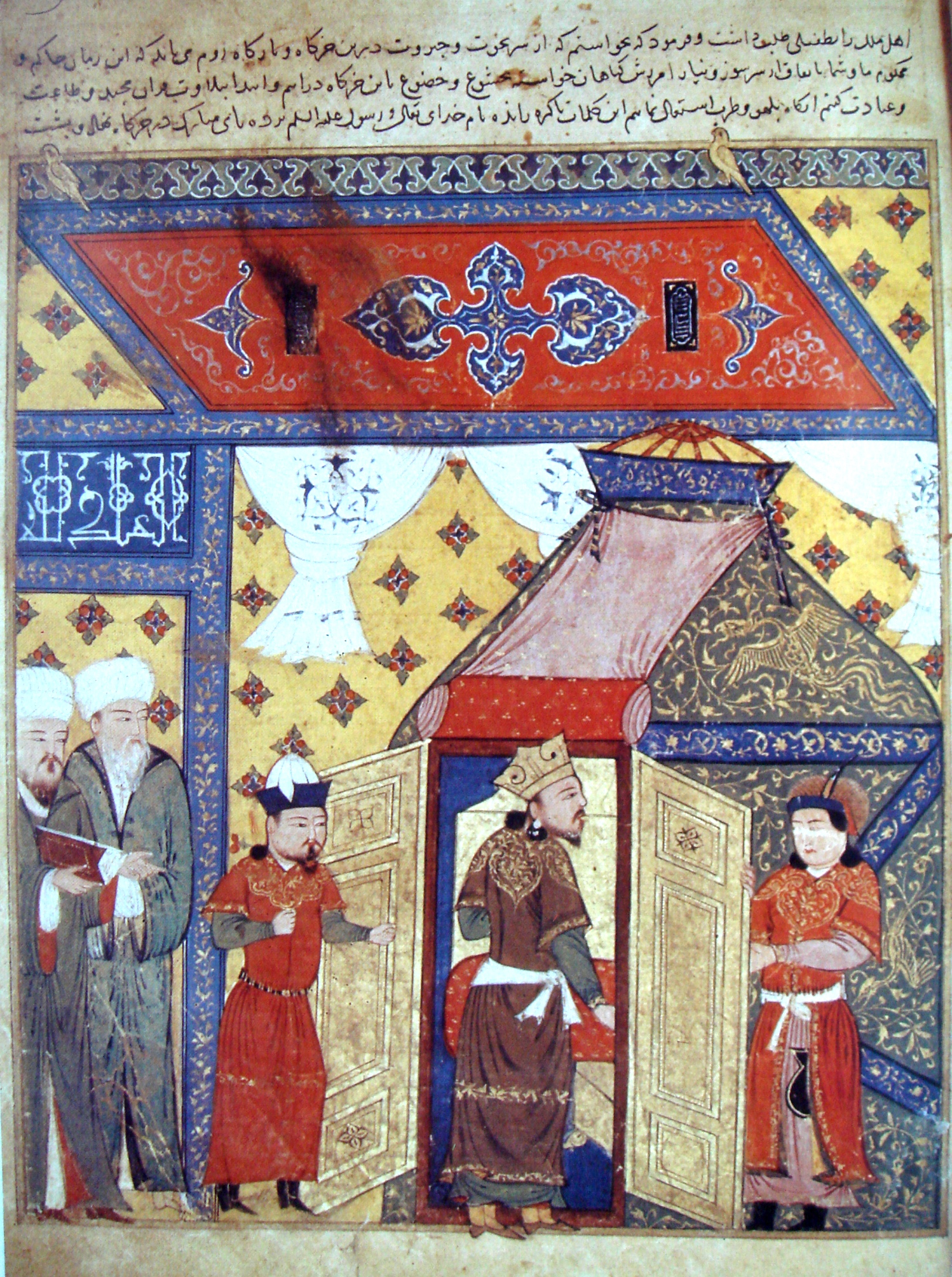
Ghazan

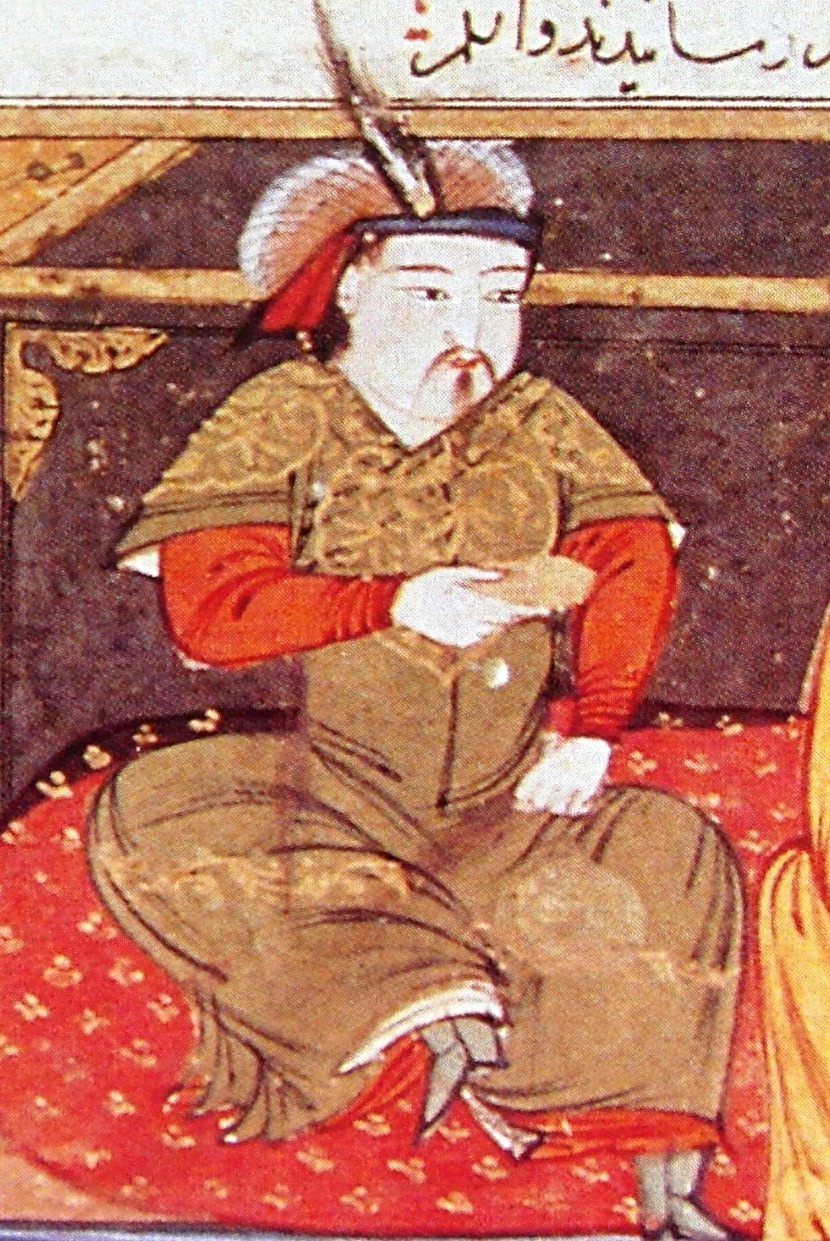
Hulagu

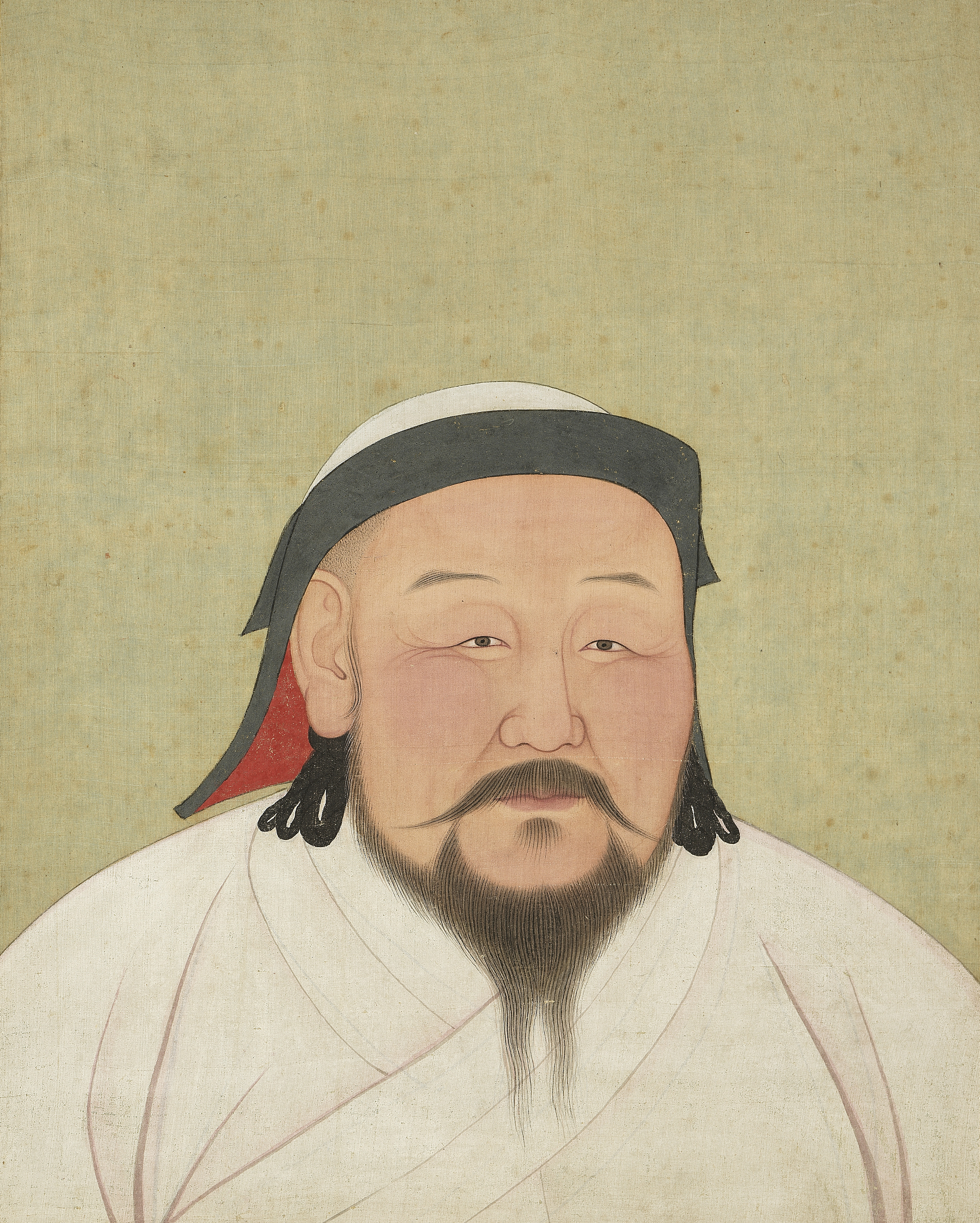
Kublai Khan

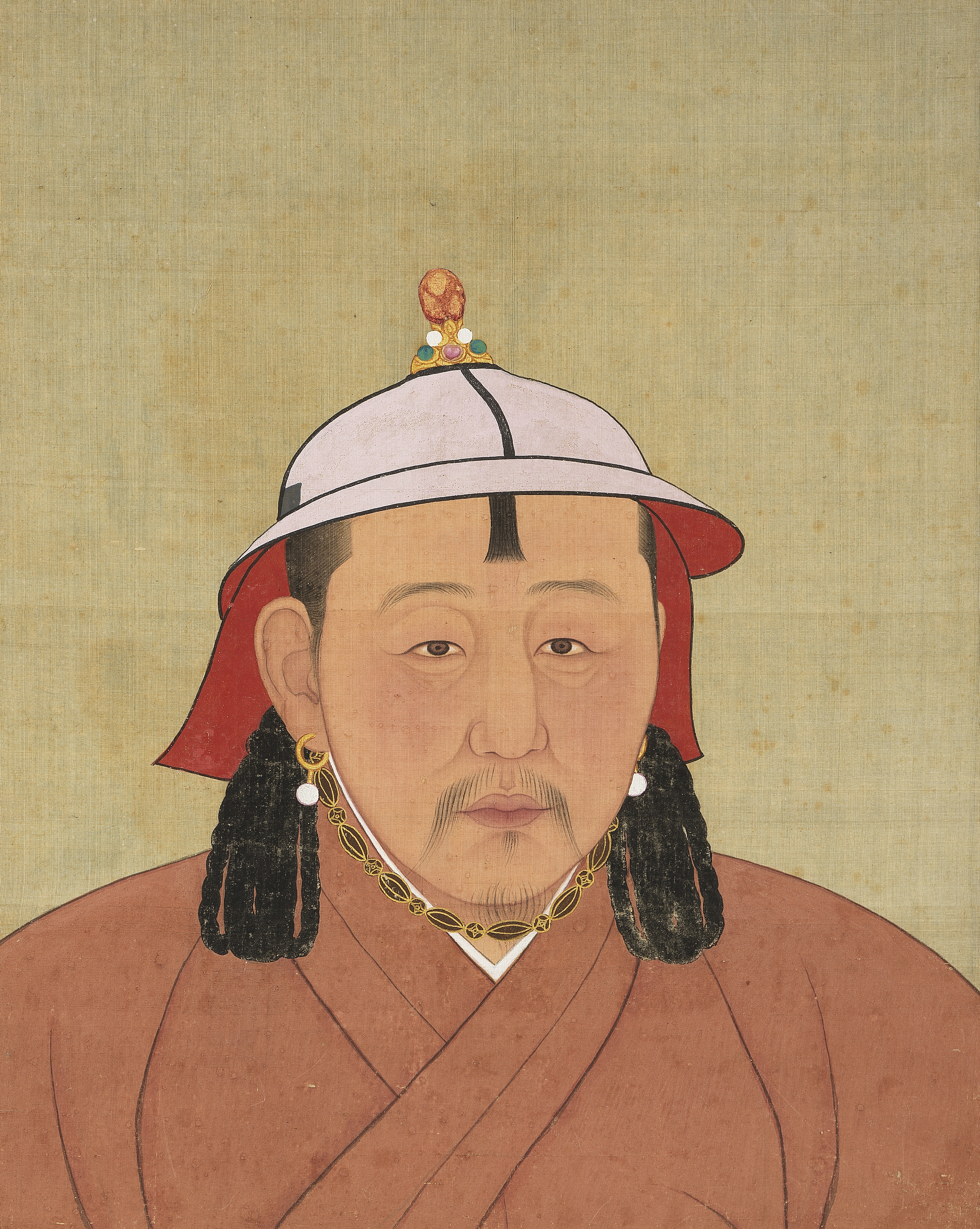
Külüg

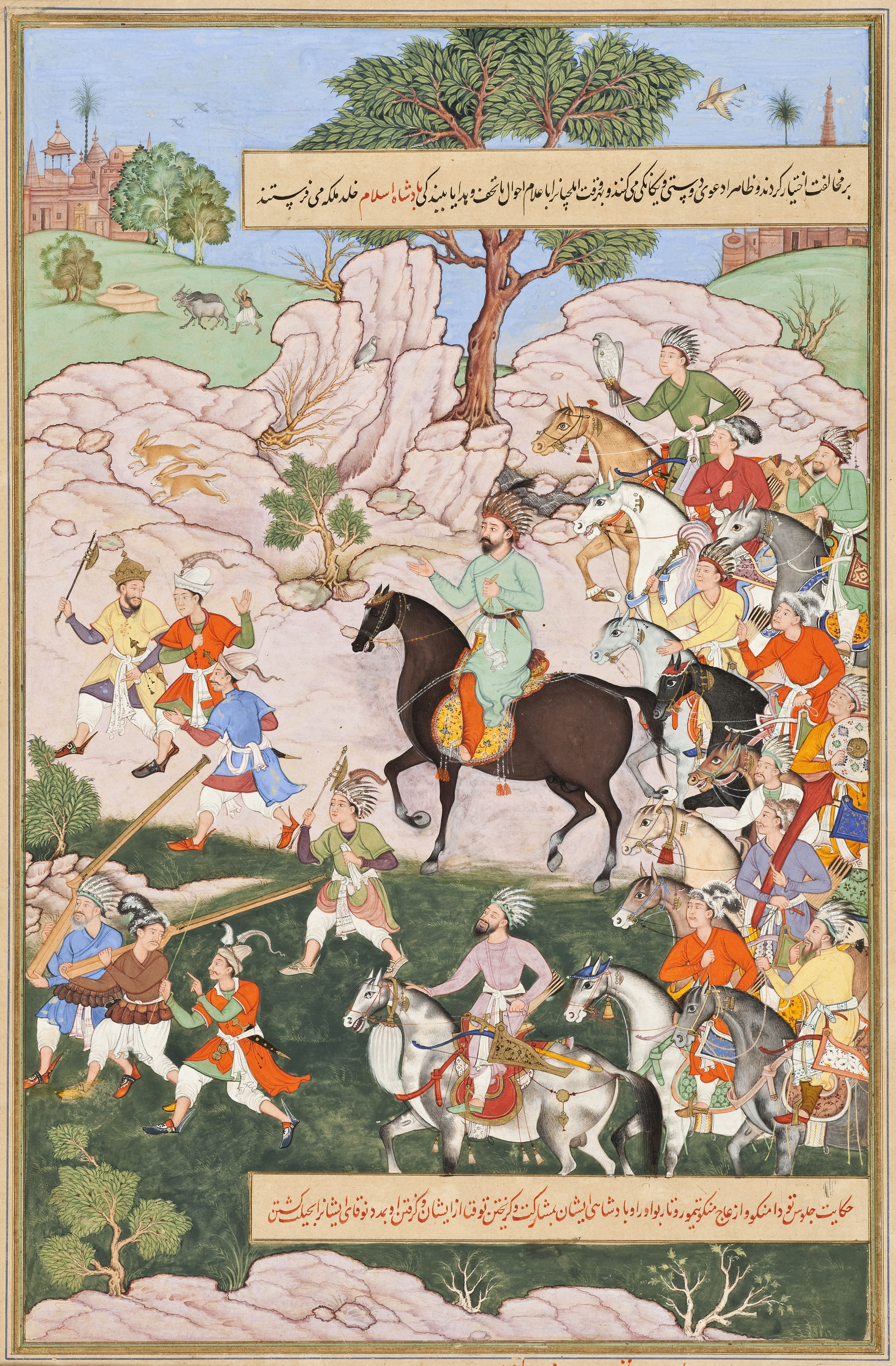
Tode Mongke

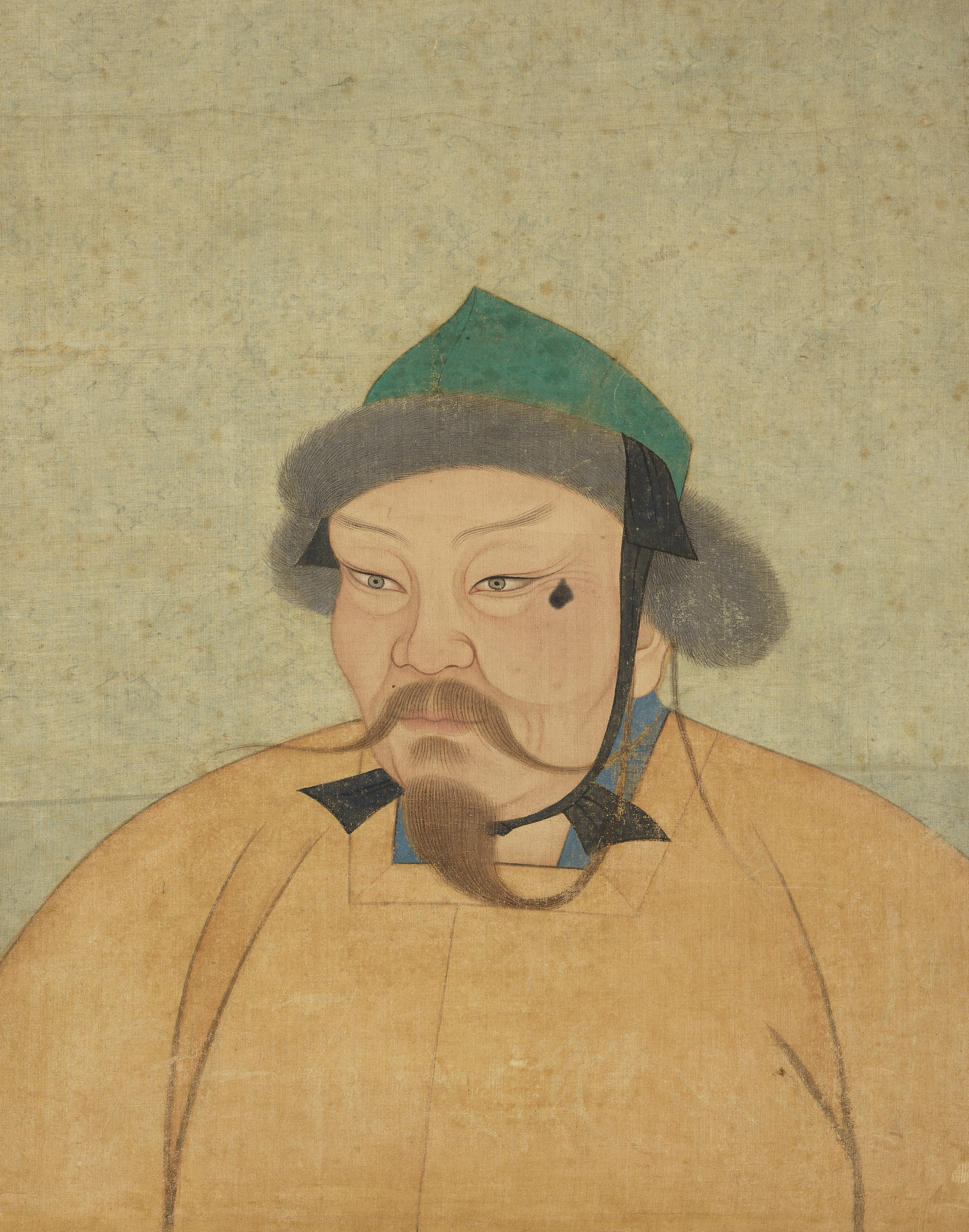
Ögedei

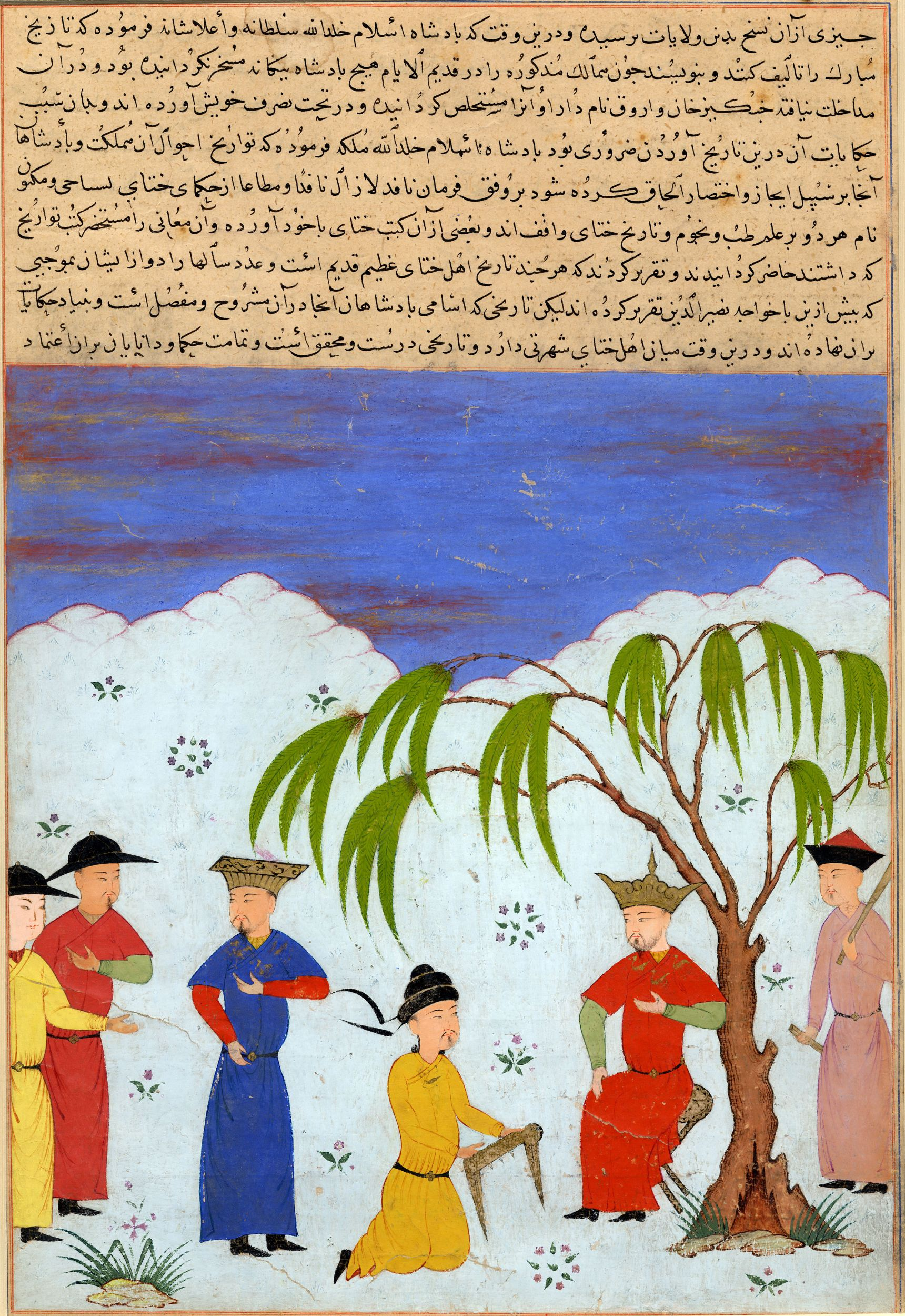
Öljaitü

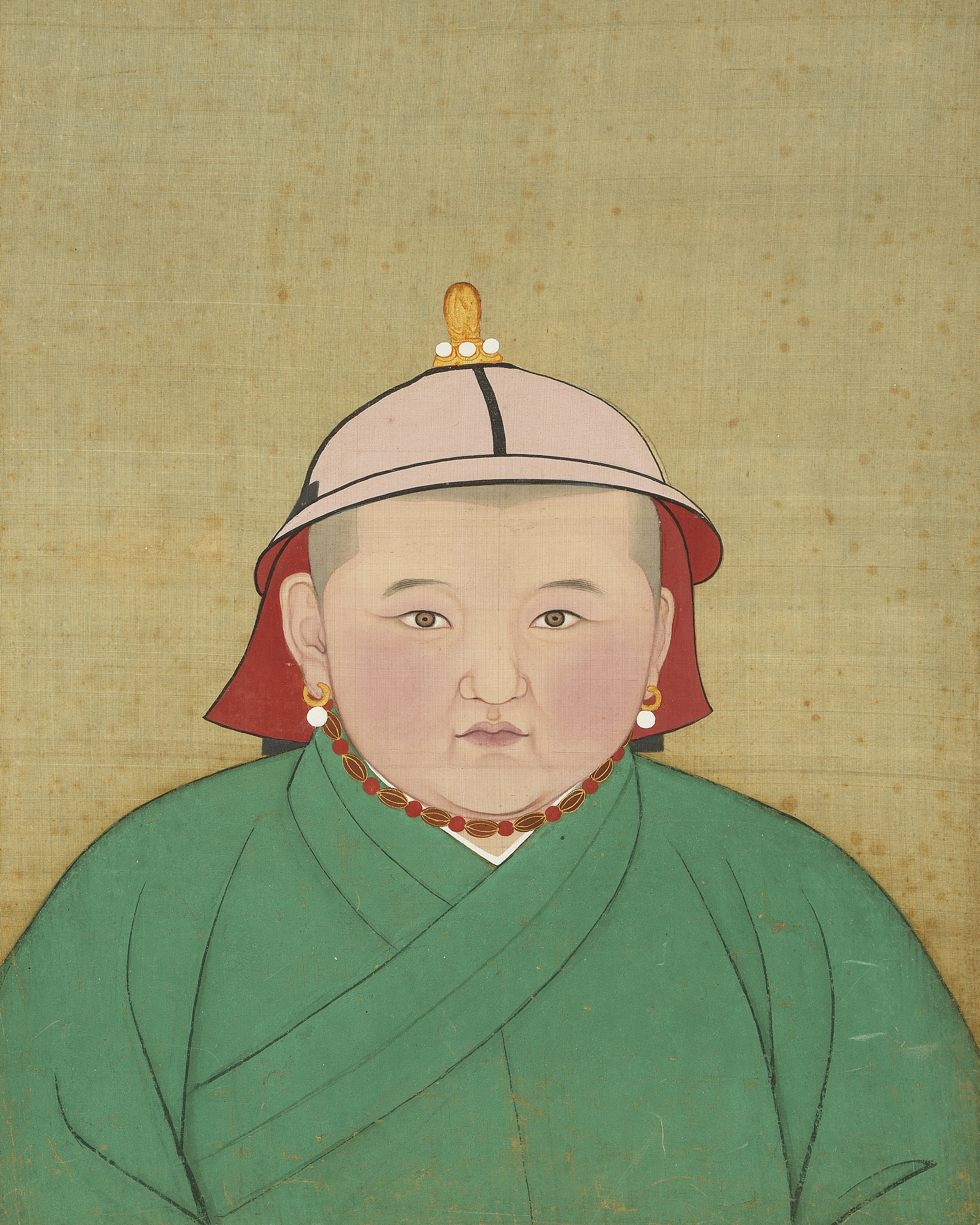
Rinchinbal

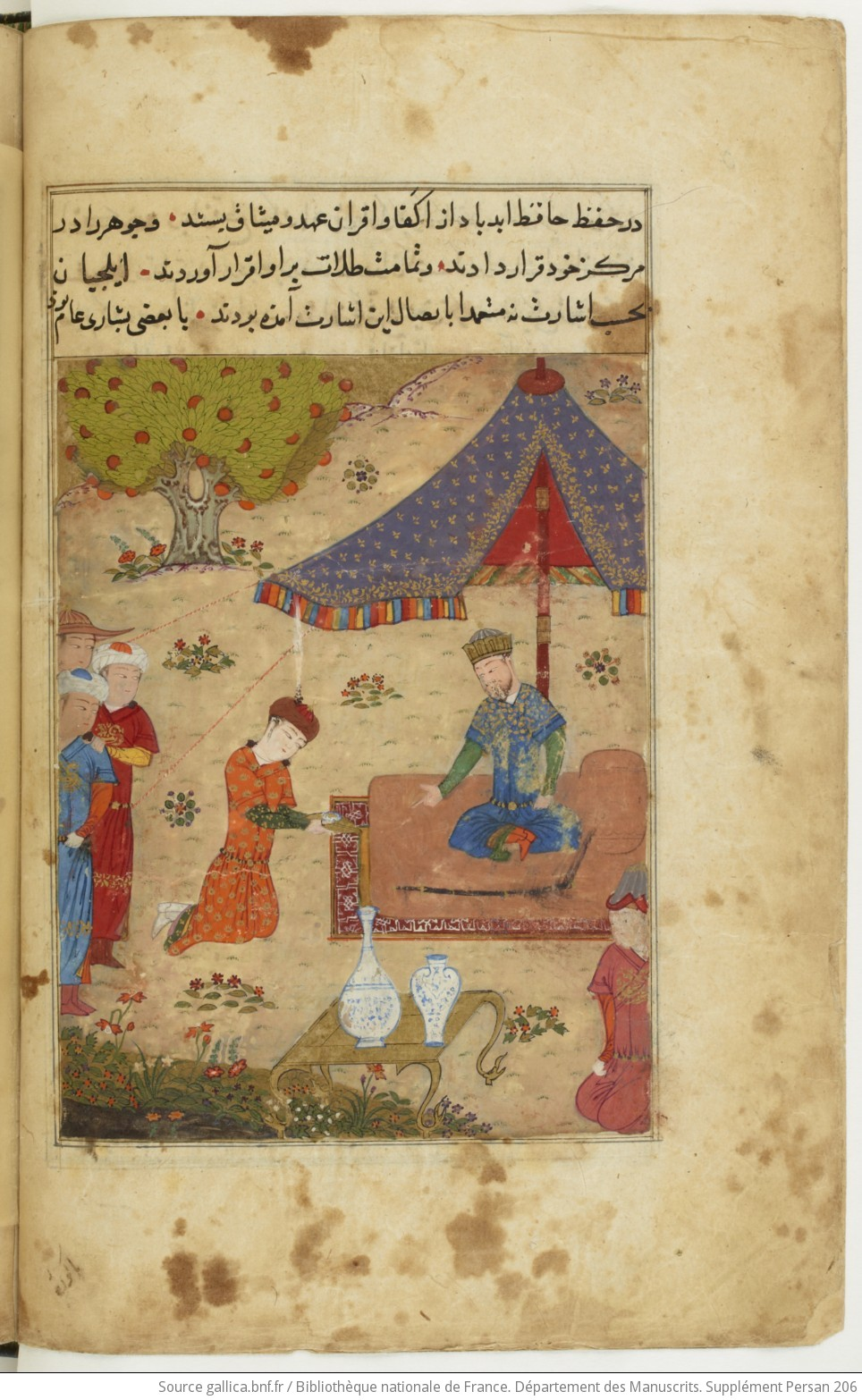
Tekuder

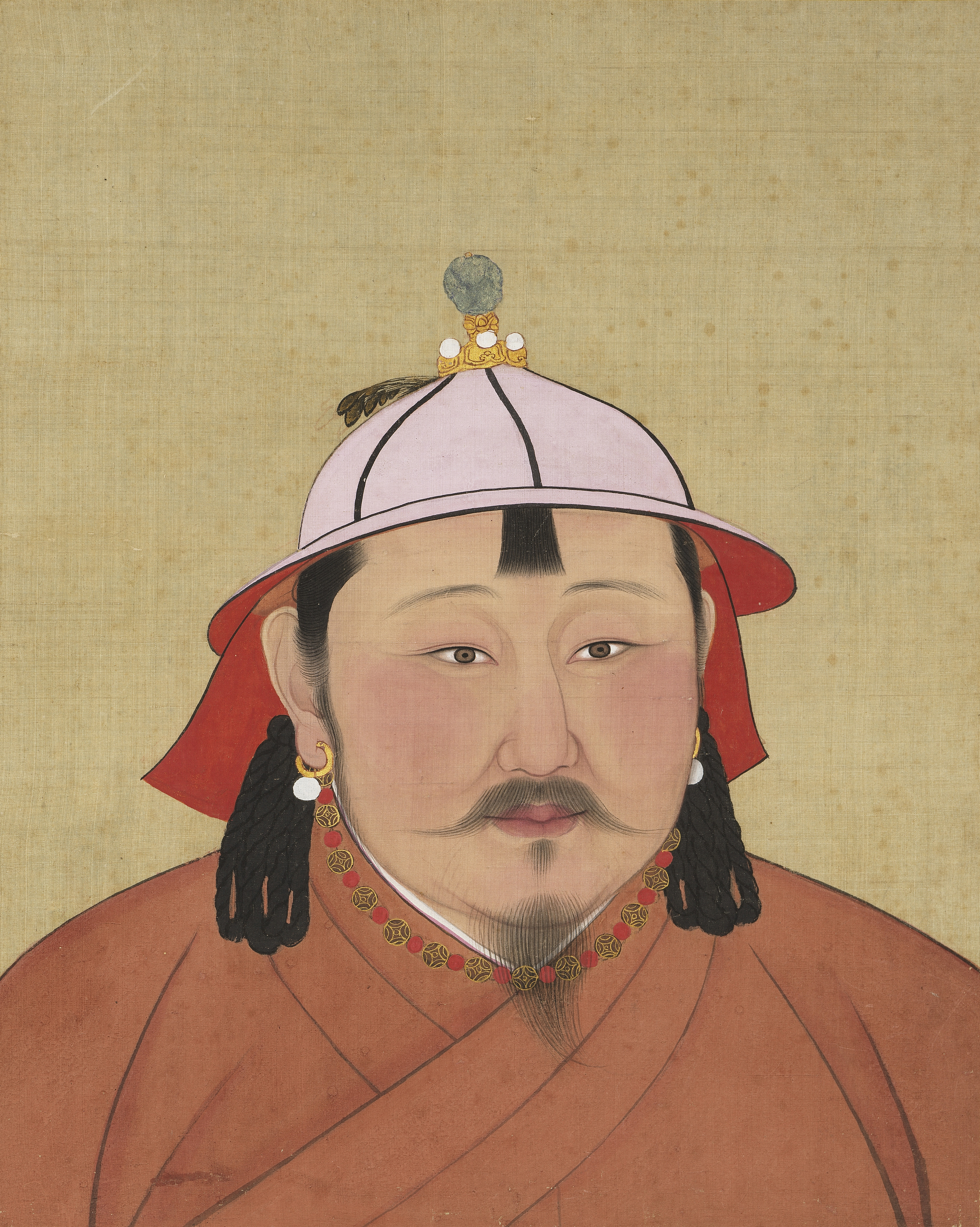
Temür Khan

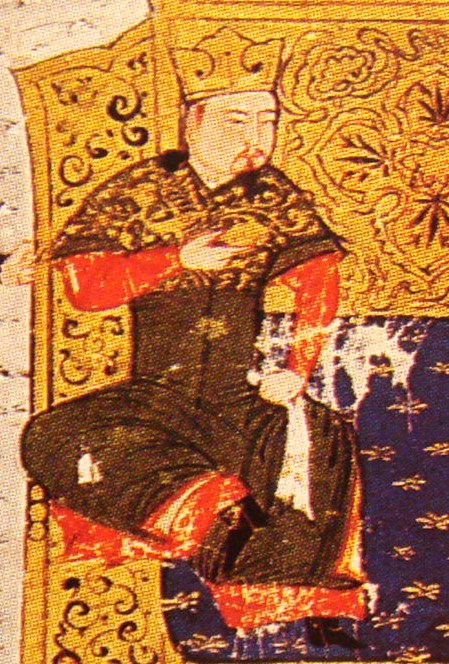
Tolui

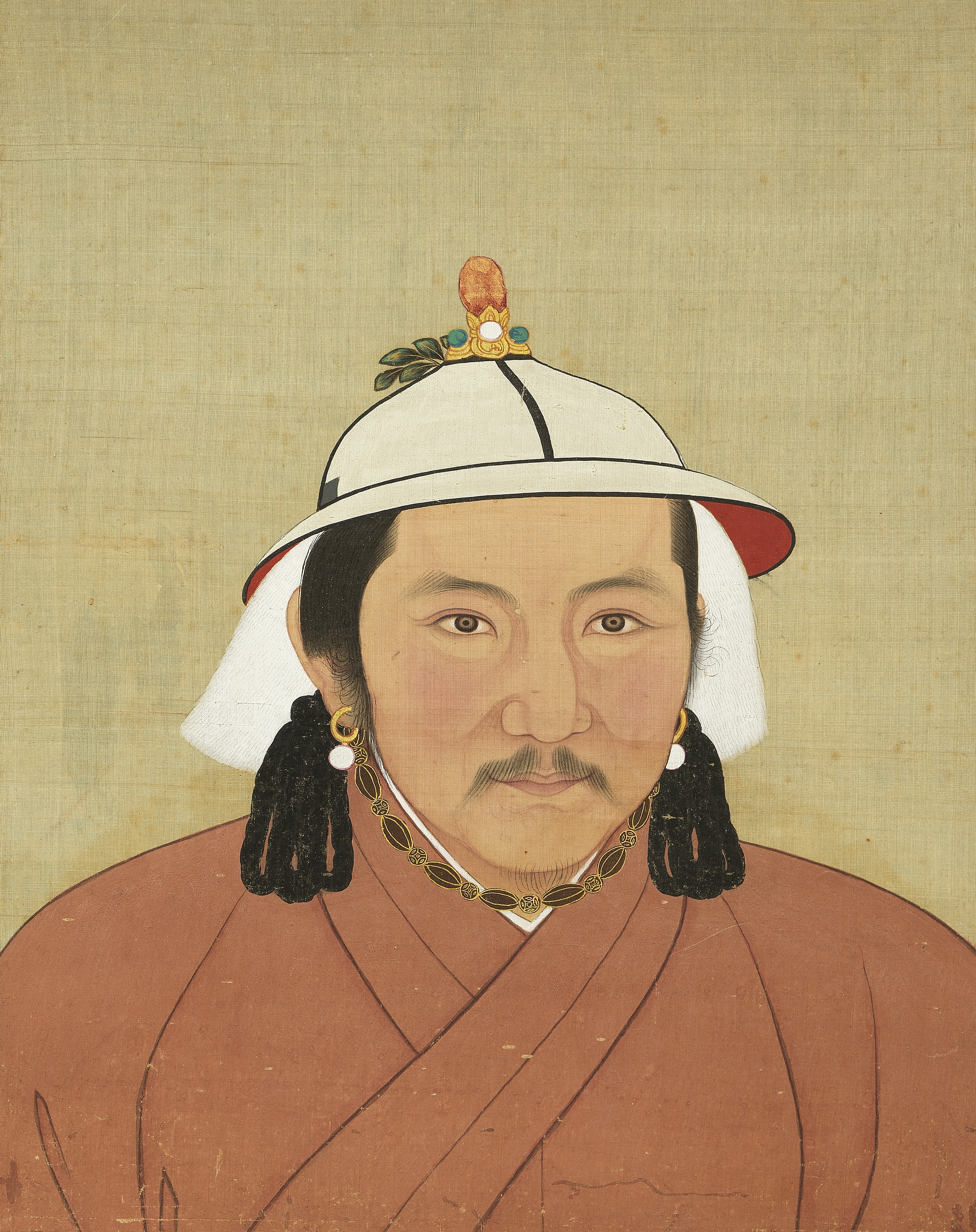
Tugh Temür

== Fictional characters ==
- Altojin, fictional girl-warrior and the protagonist of Keiko Takemiya's manga Tenma no Ketsuzoku.
- Byamba fictional character portrayed by Uli Latukefu in the American TV series Marco Polo. He is a general of both the imperial army and the Mongol horde and the illegitimate son of Kublai Khan and a Javanese woman.
- Böri Khan, a Rouran warrior-leader and the main antagonist in the 2020 film Mulan, where he's portrayed by Jason Scott Lee. The character is known as Shan Yu in the 1998 film by Disney, where he's described as a Hun.
- Uriyan Edei, Mongolian royal and a Mingghan general in the Japanese manga series and anime Angolmois: Record of Mongol Invasion.
- Atan Hadas (Euen Eun Kyo), fictional granddaughter of Genghis Khan and main character of the manhwa series Threads of Time.
- Princess Hakunamatata, fictional Mongol princess and the protagonist of the Taiwanese manhua Li Ren Man.
- Harabal, fictional Mongol general and the chief foe in the manga Shut Hell.
- Hogun, fictional character appearing in Marvel comic-books. An Asgardian, he is often said to look like a Mongolian warrior. The character was portrayed by Tadanobu Asano in the Marvel Cinematic Universe.
- Bu Jun, fictional character in the Marvel Universe. He is a mutant of Mongolian descent, affiliated with the Sleepers.
- The Mandarin, fictional supervillain appearing in American comic books published by Marvel Comics. Mandarin is of Mongolian origin and a descendant of Genghis Khan. He was portrayed by Ben Kingsley in Iron Man 3. The character was associated with Mongolian script words' in the movie, with the Mongolian minister of sports and tourism reportedly writing a letter against it, and Marvel later apologizing.
- Zhao Min, fictional Mongol princess and lead character in the wuxia novel The Heaven Sword and Dragon Saber. She was portrayed in film and television series by Ching Li (1978), Liza Wang (1978), Kitty Lai (1986), Sharla Cheung (1993), Cecilia Yip (1994), Gigi Lai (2000), Alyssa Chia (2003), Ady An (2009) and Chen Yuqi (2019).
- Mulan, legendary folk heroine of Chinese history. The legendary character was born in Northern Wei in the 4th-6th century AD, which frequently engaged in intermarriage with the Rouran royals. Further, the Northern Wei were themselves Xianbei, of Donghu origin.
- Pagma, fictional character portrayed by Badema in the 1991 film Close to Eden. She appears as Genghis Khan's wife in Gombo's dream, dressed in the Mongolian imperial fashion. The dress of Star Wars' Padmé was based on such Mongolian imperial fashion.
- Temjin, the son of a Kiyat chieftain, protagonist of the Japanese manga Fenrir.
- Temujin, fictional character in the Naruto Universe, of unknown origins. He has the birth name of Genghis Khan.
- Minamoto no Yoshitsune / Temjin as per the Yoshitsune = Genghis Khan Theory; protagonist of the Japanese manga Khan: Kusa to Tetsu to Hitsuji.
- Yurul, fictional Mongol prince and one of the main characters of the Japanese manga Shut Hell.
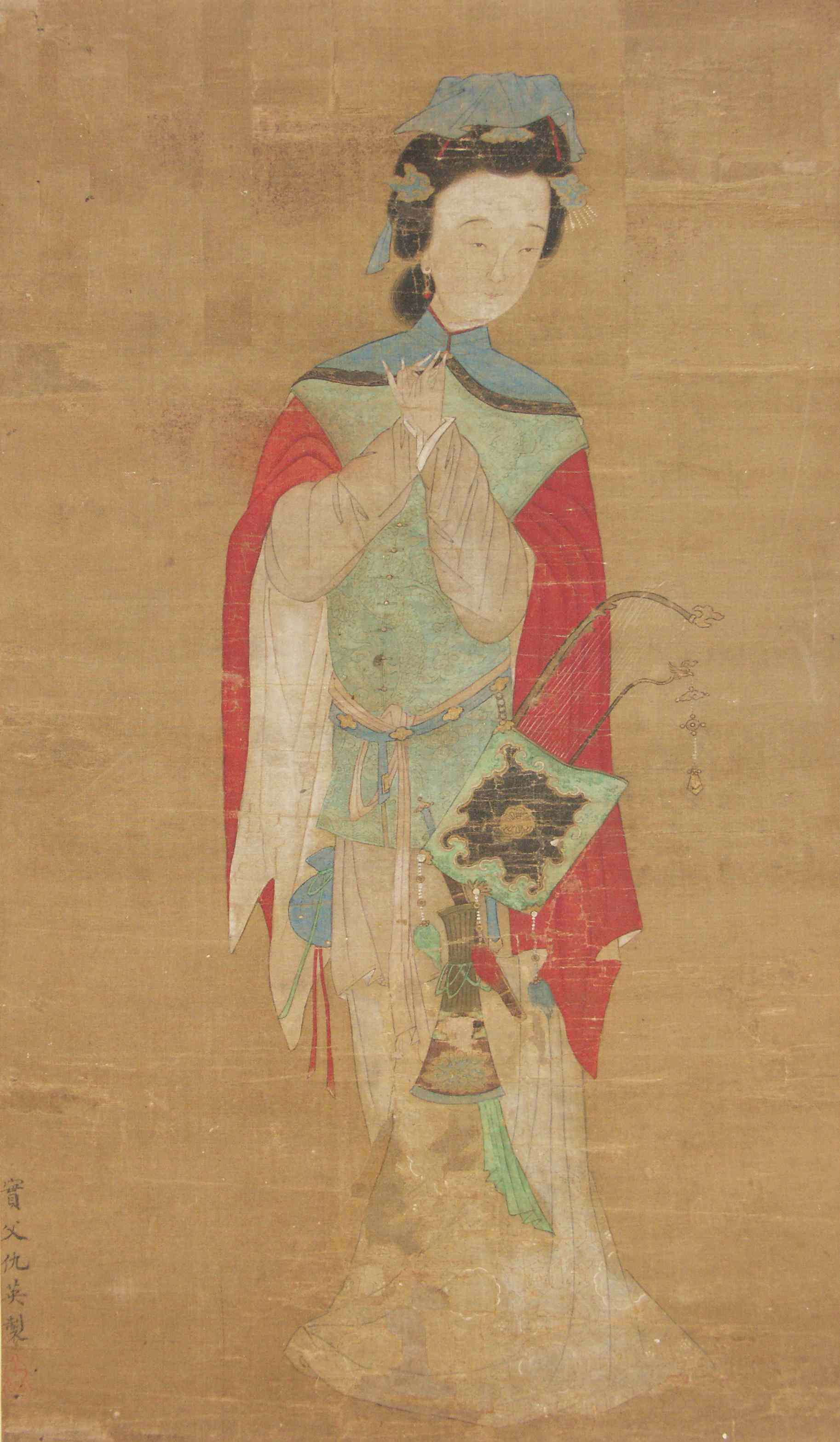
Mulan

== Other ==
- Jügderdemidiin Gürragchaa (b. 1947), aerospace engineer, Major General, politician and astronaut, who in 1981 became the first Mongolian in space.
- Avani Gregg (b. 2002), social media personality and make-up artist partly of Mongolian descent. Won the 12th Shorty Awards for TikToker of the Year.
- Bai Yansong (b. 1968), news commentator, anchor and journalist.

== See also ==
- List of Mongol rulers
- List of Buryats
- List of Oirats
