= Art Space 976+ =

Art gallery in Khan Uul, Ulaanbaatar, Mongolia

Art Space 976+, formerly known as 976 Art Gallery, is a contemporary art gallery located in Khan Uul District, Ulaanbaatar, Mongolia.

== History ==
976 Art Gallery was founded in 2012 by Gantuya Badamgarav with an aim to increase the visibility of Mongolian contemporary art. In 2017, the gallery started a collaboration with a company Alaqai and change its name to Art Space 976+.

Since its conception, the gallery has been actively organizing exhibitions, performances, and discussions with many of the leading Mongolian contemporary artists such as Enkhbold Togmidshiirev, Munkhtsetseg Jalkhaajav, Nomin Bold, Uuriintuya Dagvasambuu, Baatarzorig Batjargal, Jantsankhorol Erdenebayar, Munkhbolor Ganbold, and Davaajargal Tsaschikher, many of whom have participated in international exhibitions such as La Biennale di Venezia and documenta 14. With its growing international profile, the gallery has become a cultural hub of Ulaanbaatar, working with well-known international artists such as Walter Riedweg (Switzerland), Mauricio Dias (Brazil), Nathalie Daoust (Canada), Christian Faubel (Germany), Mirian Kolev (Bulgaria), and Outsiders Factory (Taiwan).
