= Gantuya Badamgarav =

Mongolian art curator (born 1968)

- Born: 1968 (age 57–58)
- Education: Williams College

Gantuya Badamgarav (Mongolian: Бадамгаравын Гантуяа) is a Mongolian art curator and the founder of Art Space 976+. She is the first ever organizer and commissioner of Mongolia Pavilion at La Biennale di Venezia.

== Early life and career ==
Gantuya was born in 1968, in Mandalgovi, Mongolia. When she graduated high school, Gantuya was torn between math and art to select her major, as she had a strong passion for both. She is a bronze medalist from the National Mathematical Olympiad of Mongolia and participant of International Mathematical Olympiad in Finland, 1985. As socialist Mongolia did not encourage artistic endeavors, Gantuya decided to become an economist. She studied Macro Economic Planning in Leningrad Institute of Economics and Finance (present day Saint Petersburg State University of Economics and Finance) in 1980s and received her master's degree from Williams College, USA in Macroeconomic Policy in 2006. After the collapse of the socialist system in Mongolia, Gantuya worked for the Asian Development Bank, United States Agency for International Development and other institutions as an economic analyst and consultant, and later she had held strategic development positions in largest conglomerates in Mongolia, such as Tavan Bogd Group.

In 2012, Gantuya quit her successful career and founded Art Space 976+ (formerly known as 976 Art Gallery) with a desire to promote contemporary art of Mongolia. Within few years, Gantuya and her team managed Art Space 976+ becoming an important cultural hub of Ulaanbaatar city, by hosting experimental exhibitions, performances, and open discussions with leading contemporary artists of Mongolia, all the while collaborating with renowned international artists.

Upon opening Art Space 976+, Gantuya quickly realized that contemporary art in Mongolia needed "a significant amount of support". Thus, she established a non-government organization Mongolian Contemporary Art Support Association (MCASA). Through MCASA, Gantuya commissioned the first ever participation of Mongolia at La Biennale di Venezia in 2015. Later she continued the endeavor by organizing the 2017 and the 2019 Mongolia Pavilions where she worked as a curator for the latter. Titled A Temporarily, "project stem[ed] from the curator’s ambition to transform ancient mediums of oral expression into contemporary form". It included a site-specific installation by Jantsankhorol Erdenebayar along with a sound installation made in collaboration with Carsten Nicolai and Mongolian traditional throat singers. The exhibition garnered an extensive media attention, marking it as one of the must visit pavilions of that year.

Moreover, Gantuya has worked as an independent curator for multiple projects such as Echoes of the Void by Italian artist Maria Rebecca Ballestra, China Dolls by Canadian artist Nathalie Daoust and Nomad Spirit by Diaz & Riedweg and 5 Mongolian artists, including Munkhbolor Ganbold and Davaajargal Tsaschikher.

She is one of the contributing authors of the documenta 14 Daybook and speaker at 7th World Summit on Arts and Culture in Malta, Culture Summit Abu Dhabi 2018 and TEDx Ulaanbaatar 2018.
