= Uuriintuya Dagvasambuu =

Mongolian artist

- Born: 1979; Ulaanbaatar, Mongolia
- Style: Mongol Zurag

Uuriintuya Dagvasambuu (Mongolian: Дагвасамбуугийн Үүрийнтуяа) is a Mongolian artist. As a "contemporary master of Mongol Zurag", she incorporates traditional patterns and Buddhist motifs in her paintings and draws on experiences of Mongolian women and the everyday lives of post-nomadic Mongolia.

== Early life and career ==
Dagvasambuu was born in 1979 in Ulaanbaatar, Mongolia. She received her bachelor's degree in 2002 from Mongolian University of Arts and Culture. Later in 2004, she graduated from the Mongolian State University of Education with a master's degree.

Dagvasambuu has exhibited extensively at international exhibitions such as Asia Pacific Triennial and Fukuoka Asian Art Triennale. She was part of the 2017 documenta 14 tour organized by Goethe Institute Mongolia in partnership with Mongolian Contemporary Art Support Association.

Dagvasambuu is married to a Mongolian artist and curator Batzorig Mart. In 2019, they had a joint exhibition exploring the extent of each other's influence on one another's work. Titled Assimilation Non-Assimilation, the exhibition was held at Art Space 976+, Ulaanbaatar, Mongolia.

== Notable exhibitions ==
=== Solo exhibitions ===
2018 ХАДГАЛАГДАХ, Art Space 976+, Ulaanbaatar, Mongolia

=== Selected group exhibitions ===
2020 NADA Fair, Texas, USA

2020 Dallas Art Fair, Dallas, USA

2019 Assimilation Non-Assimilation, at Art Space 976+, Ulaanbaatar, Mongolia

2019 The Art of Everyday, Sapar Contemporary, NY, USA

2016 The Garden of Winter Light (a space to linger), at Hanart TZ, Hong Kong

2015 8th Asia Pacific Triennial, Queensland, Australia

2014 5th Fukuoka Asian Art Triennale, Fukuoka, Japan

2014 Contemporary Art of Mongolia II, at Art Space 976+, Ulaanbaatar, Mongolia

2013 Women in Between: Asian Women Artists 1984 -2012, Tochigi Prefectural Museum of Fine Arts, Japan

2012 Women in Between: Asian Women Artists 1984-2012, at Fukuoka Asian Art Museum, Japan

2012 9th Shanghai Biennale, Shanghai, China

2012 Arsenal 2012 Kyiv Biennial, Ukraine

2011 Between Heaven and Earth: Contemporary Art from the Centre of Asia, at Calvert 22, London, UK

2010 From Imagination to Creation, National Modern Art Gallery, Ulaanbaatar, Mongolia

2010 Smoke in the Brain, Red Ger Art Gallery, Ulaanbaatar, Mongolia

2010 Modern Mongolia, Han Art Gallery, Hong Kong

2008 3rd Beijing Biennale, Beijing, China

2006 Art Expo, Las Vegas, USA

== Selected awards ==
Uuriintuya is a recipient of several prestigious awards including 2012 Grand Prix for Best Art from Association of Mongol Zurag, 2013 Grand Prix for Best Artworks of the Year from National Modern Art Gallery of Mongolia as well as 2018 Grand Prix for Best Artwork of the Year from Union of Mongolian Artists.
