= Baatarzorig Batjargal =

Mongolian painter

- Born: 1983; Ulaanbaatar, Mongolia
- Spouse: Nomin Bold

Baatarzorig Batjargal (Mongolian: Батжаргалын Баатарзориг) is a Mongolian painter "who draws on the techniques of Mongol Zurag painting to address the broader history of Mongolia’s development over the past century". His artistic process includes his collection of various objects such as nomadic heirlooms and metal decorations which he often uses as a canvas for his paintings.

== Life and education ==
Baatarzorig Batjargal was born in 1983 in Ulaanbaatar, Mongolia. He studied Mongol Zurag (BA) at the University of Arts and Culture, Ulaanbaatar and graduated in 2005. He is a member of Union of Mongolian Artists (UMA), Mongol Zurag Society and Global Artist Pension Trust. He is married to a fellow artist Nomin Bold.

== Notable exhibitions ==
=== Solo exhibitions ===
2019 Wolf Totem, at Jack Bell Gallery, London, UK

2018 White Lion, at Jack Bell Gallery, London, UK

2017 Red Hero, at Jack Bell Gallery, London, UK

2014 The One, at Art Space 976+, Ulaanbaatar, Mongolia

=== Group exhibitions ===
2019 Contemporary Art of Mongolia, at Areteos Art Space — G4, Hong Kong

2018 Second Yinchuan Biennale, at MOCA Yinchuan, China

2018 Urban Nomadism, at Boxes Art Museum, Foshan, China

2017 Beyond Heaven and Earth, at China Art Museum, Shanghai, China

2016 Asia Pacific Triennial, at Queensland, Australia

2015 Modern Transformations-New Identities, at Nord Art, Germany

2015 Contemporary Mongol Zurag, at Art Space 976+, Ulaanbaatar, Mongolia
