= Marzan Sharav =

Mongolian painter

Balduugiin "Marzan" Sharav (1869 – 1939, Mongolian: Балдугийн 'Марзан' Шарав; marzan = facetious), was a Mongolian painter.

He is often credited with the introduction of modern painting styles to Mongolia, but his most famous work, One day in Mongolia (Mongolian: Mongolyn neg ödör), is done in a more traditional zurag style. His other well-known work includes portraits of the Bogd Khan and his queen Dondogdulam. He also painted a famed series called "A Day in Mongolia" with various landscape views and the capital city.

== Gallery ==
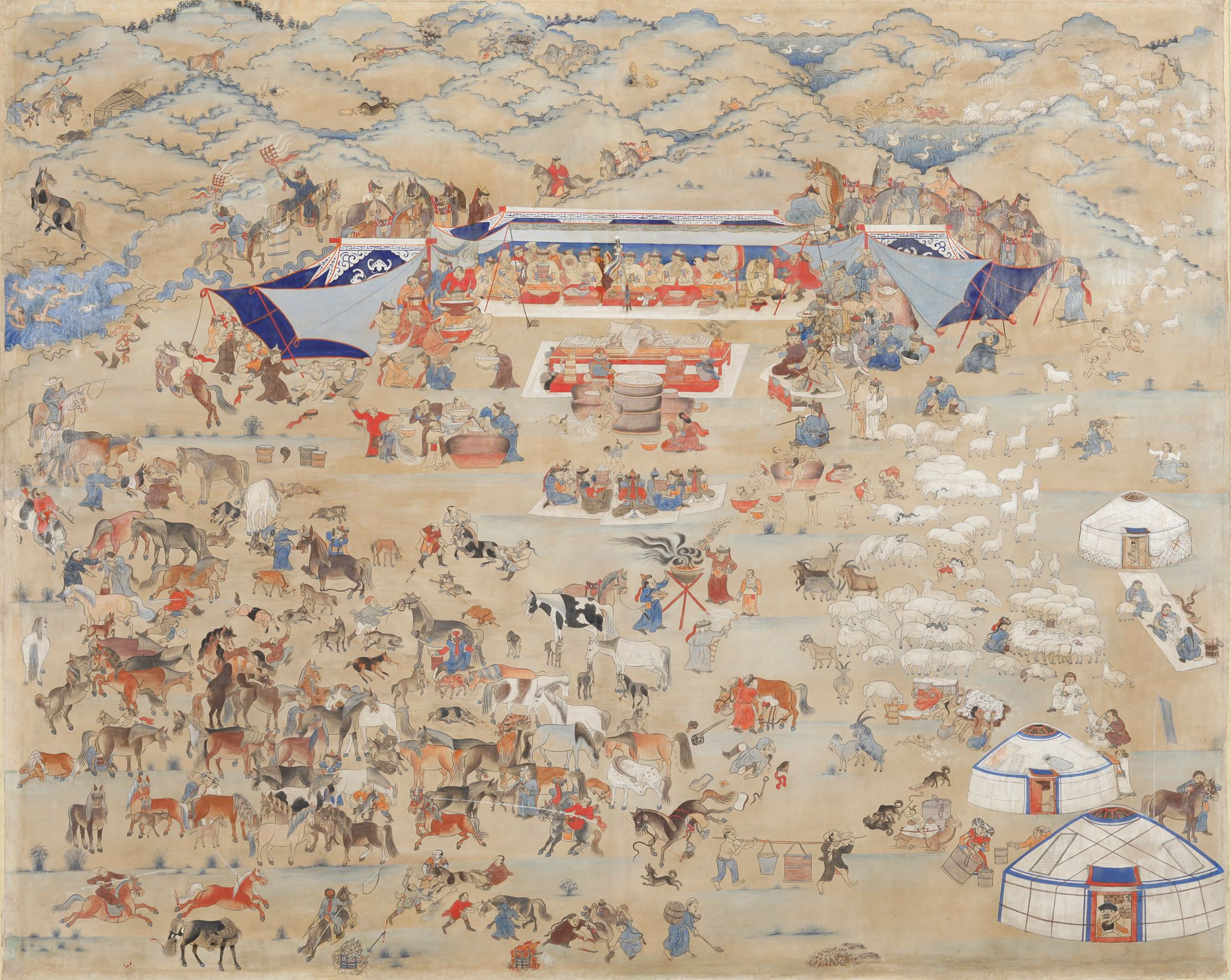
A Day in Mongolia: Summer

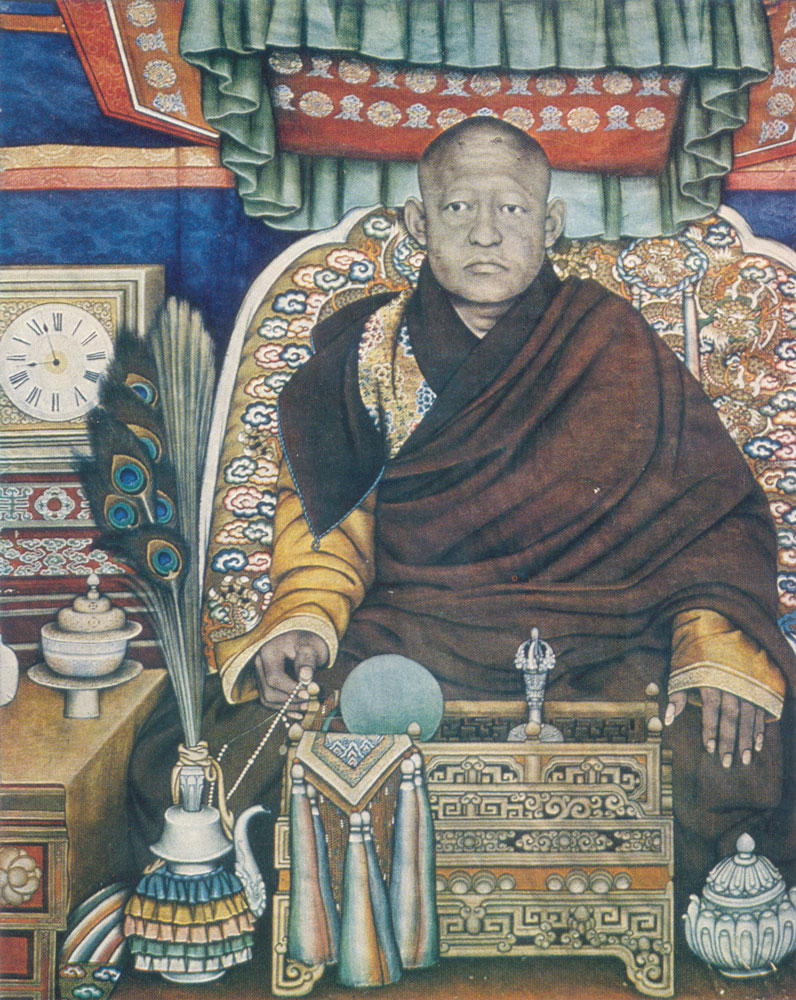
Portrait of the Bogd Khan

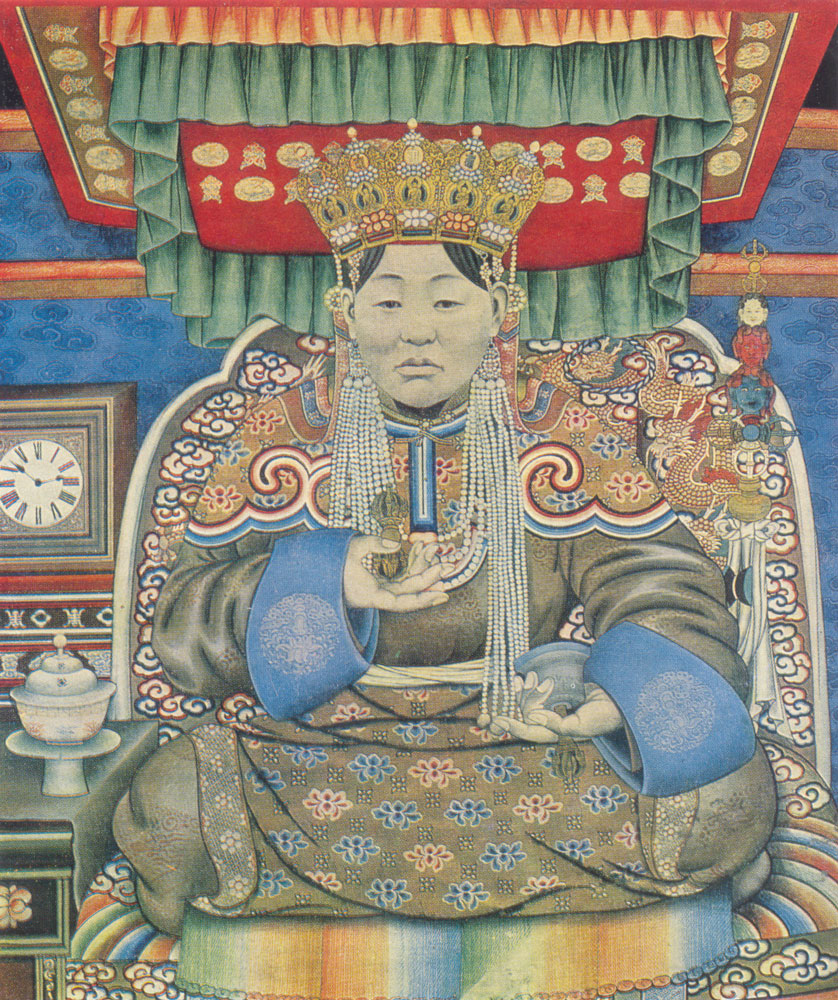
Portrait of queen Dondogdulam

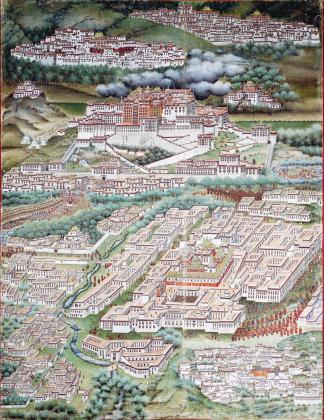
Lhasa, Early 20th century
