= Ürjingiin Yadamsüren =

Mongolian painter

- Yржингийн Ядамсүрэн
- Born: 25 December 1905; Sechen Khan, Outer Mongolia
- Died: 1987 (aged 81–82); Ulaanbaatar, Mongolian People's Republic
- Education: Moscow Surikov State Academic Institute of Fine Arts

Ürjingiin Yadamsüren (Mongolian: Yржингийн Ядамсүрэн, 25 December 1905 – 1987) was a Mongolian artist best known for popularising the Mongol zurag style of painting.

== Biography ==
Yadamsüren was born in Setsen Khan aimag, Outer Mongolia (modern day Dornod aimag) on 25 December 1905 to a family of craftsmen: his grandfather was a woodcarver and his father painted yurts. His uncle Choidasha was a Buddhist monk and Yadamsüren studied woodblock printing with him at the local monastery from the age of eight to fifteen. Yadamsüren grew up in a time of upheaval; Mongolia gained independence from Qing China in 1911, and by the communist Mongolian People's Republic, closely aligned with the Soviet Union, had been established.

In 1930 Yadamsüren relocated in Ulan Bator where he initially worked as a typesetter. He then trained as a political commissar at the Communist University of the Toilers of the East in Moscow (1933–1937) and worked for the Mongolian People's Revolutionary Party's Central Committee for a year. Between 1938 and 1942 he studied at the Surikov Art Institute under Sergei Gerasimov and Igor Grabar.

Returning to Ulan Bator, Yadamsüren used the techniques he had learned in Moscow to produce oil paintings in a socialist realist style. His work at this time depicted events in the early history of the Mongolian People's Republic and patriotic figures such as Marshall Choibalsang and Sükhbaatar. Yadamsüren produced over 200 paintings in this style, including First Congress of the MAKHN, (Note: MAKHN = Mongolian People's Revolutionary Party (Mongolian: Монгол Ардын Хувьсгалт Нам, МАХН)) Capturing Kyakhta, First Encounter of Sükhbaatar's Partisans and the Gamin, (Note: Gamin (Mongolian: гамин) refers to soldiers of the Chinese National Revolutionary Army, from the Chinese word gémìng, meaning "revolutionary".) and Portrait of Sükhbaatar. He also worked as an art teacher.

In the 1950s Yadamsüren moved away from European oil painting techniques and turned to flat, solid colours in gouache, reminiscent of earlier Buddhist art. He also began to explore a greater diversity of subjects – not just revolutionary and patriotic, but figures from Mongolia's earlier history, and scenes from everyday pastoral life. This neotraditional style became known as Mongol zurag and Yadamsüren is considered one of its pioneers. His 1958 work The Old Fiddler (Mongolian: Өвгөн хуурч), depicting an old man holding a morin khuur (horse-head fiddle), is credited with bringing the style to national audience. It remains one of Mongolia's most frequently reproduced paintings.

As well as painting, Yadamsüren was interested in Mongolian folk costume. He worked with Byambyn Rinchen to publish two collections of traditional Mongolian dress in 1961 and 1974. His wife and daughter also made costumes from his designs, and together they outfitted many of the country's leading theatre companies.

== Honours ==
- People's Artist of Mongolia
