= Nomin Bold =

Mongolian painter

Nomin Bold (Mongolian: Болдын Номин) is a Mongolian painter born in 1982 in Ulaanbaatar, Mongolia. She is part of a new generation of artists which uses the Mongol Zurag painting style. Nomin Bold studied Mongol Zurag at the School of Fine Arts at the Mongolian University of Arts and Culture. According to her, Nomin's paintings are influenced by the Buddhist Thangka paintings. She is married to a Mongolian artist Baatarzorig Batjargal.

== dokumenta 14 ==
Two of her paintings, One Day of Mongolia 2017 (acrylic, gold sheets on canvas, 150×200 cm) and Grey Palace 2017 (acrylic on canvas, 150×200 cm) had been shown at documenta 14 in Kassel, Germany, at the Natural History Museum Ottoneum.

== Notable exhibitions ==
=== Solo exhibitions ===
2014 Naughty Game, at Art Space 976+, Ulaanbaatar, Mongolia

=== Group exhibitions ===
2018 2nd Yinchuan Biennale, at Yinchuan, China

2017 documenta 14, at Kassel, Germany

2015 Asia Pacific Triennial, at Queensland, Australia

== Paintings at Google Arts & Culture ==
- The Painting Tomorrow at Google Arts & Culture
- The Painting Labyrinth game at Google Arts & Culture
