= Munkhtsetseg Jalkhaajav =

Mongolian artist (born 1967)

- Born: 1967 (age 58–59); Ulaanbaatar, Mongolia
- Website: http://www.artbayarmugi.com/mugi

Munkhtsetseg Jalkhaajav (Mongolian: Жалхаажавын Мөнхцэцэг) also known as Mugi, is one of the leading contemporary artists of Mongolia. Her interdisciplinary works incorporate paintings, sculptures, collages, performance and media art.

== Early life and career ==
Munkhtsetseg was born in 1967 in Ulaanbaatar, Mongolia. She graduated from the Fine Arts College, Ulaanbaatar in 1987. Between 1989-1994, she studied at the Academy of Fine Arts and Minsk Theater. However, she chose not to graduate because she did not approve of the curriculum during the socialist regime.

Her 2015 solo show titled Reincarnation was held as part of the international exhibition held in conjunction with the La Biennale di Venezia.

In 2022, it was announced that she will represent Mongolia at the 59th International Art Exhibition of La Biennale di Venezia with her exhibition titled A Journey Through Vulnerability.

Munkhtsetseg is married to Erdenebayar Monkhor, a Mongolian painter and sculptor. They have a son together, Jantsankhorol Erdenebayar, who is also an artist.

== Notable exhibitions ==
=== Solo exhibitions ===
- 2012 Earthbound, at Schoeni Art Gallery, Hong Kong
- 2015 Reincarnation - Personal Structures, Palazzo Bembo, Venice, Italy
- 2019 Inside Passage or A Journey Through Vulnerability, Art Space 976+, Ulaanbaatar, Mongolia
- 2022 A Journey Through Vulnerability, Mongolia Pavilion at the 59th International Art Exhibition of La Biennale di Venezia

=== Group exhibitions ===
- 2005 2nd Beijing International Art Biennale, Beijing, China
- 2008 3rd Beijing International Art Biennale, Beijing, China
- 2012 Urban Narratives – New Contemporary Mongolian Art, Schoeni Art Gallery, Hong Kong
- 2012 Women In-Between: Asian Women Artists 1984-2012, at Fukuoka Asian and Mie Prefectural Art Museums, Japan
- 2013 Spirits of the Steppe, at Luxe Art Museum, Singapore
- 2017 Beyond Heaven and Earth: Mongolian Art In This Day and Age, at China Art Museum, Shanghai, China
- 2018 Speaking Lights and Shadows, at Art Space 976+, Ulaanbaatar, Mongolia
