= Enkhbold Togmidshiirev =

Mongolian contemporary artist

- Born: 1978
- Style: Performance art, conceptual art

Enkhbold Togmidshiirev (Mongolian: Тогмидшийрэвын Энхболд) is a Mongolian contemporary artist known for his use of "organic materials such as horse dung, ash, rust, leather and wood" in his conceptual performances.

== Life and career ==
Enkhbold was born in 1978 in Övörkhangai Province (Mongolian: Өвөрхангай аймаг), Mongolia and grew up in a nomadic family. His interest in the arts started from an early age when he began wood carving with the encouragement of his parents. In 1998, he moved to the capital city and enrolled at Setgemj College of Design and Technology, Ulaanbaatar, Mongolia. Soon after, Enkhbold transferred to the Institute of Fine Art, Ulaanbaatar, Mongolia graduating in 2005. He studied under Enkhbat Lantuu, an abstract painter, who advocated for Enkbold's inclination to step outside the traditional medium of painting and to experiment with other artistic forms such as installation art, which was the first in his cirriculum. Enkhbold Togmidshiirev is "a member of the Blue Sun Group. Founded in 2002 the Blue Sun Group is an artists group that aims to support emerging artists and alternative art practices". In 2016, he won the "Best Artwork of the Year" from Mongolian National Gallery of Modern Art.

== Notable exhibitions ==
=== Solo exhibitions ===
2016 Mining, at Art Space 976+, Ulaanbaatar, Mongolia

=== Group exhibitions ===
2018 2nd Yinchuan Biennale, at Yinchuan Contemporary Art Museum, China

2016 Land Art Mongolia - 4th Biennial, Ulaanbaatar, Mongolia

2015 Lost Children of Heaven, at Art Space 976+, Ulaanbaatar, Mongolia

2015 Asia Triennial Manchester, at Manchester Museum, UK

2015 Other Home, at Mongolia Pavilion in La Biennale di Venezia, Venice, Italy

2012 Shanghai Biennale, Shanghai, China
