= Culture Summit Abu Dhabi =

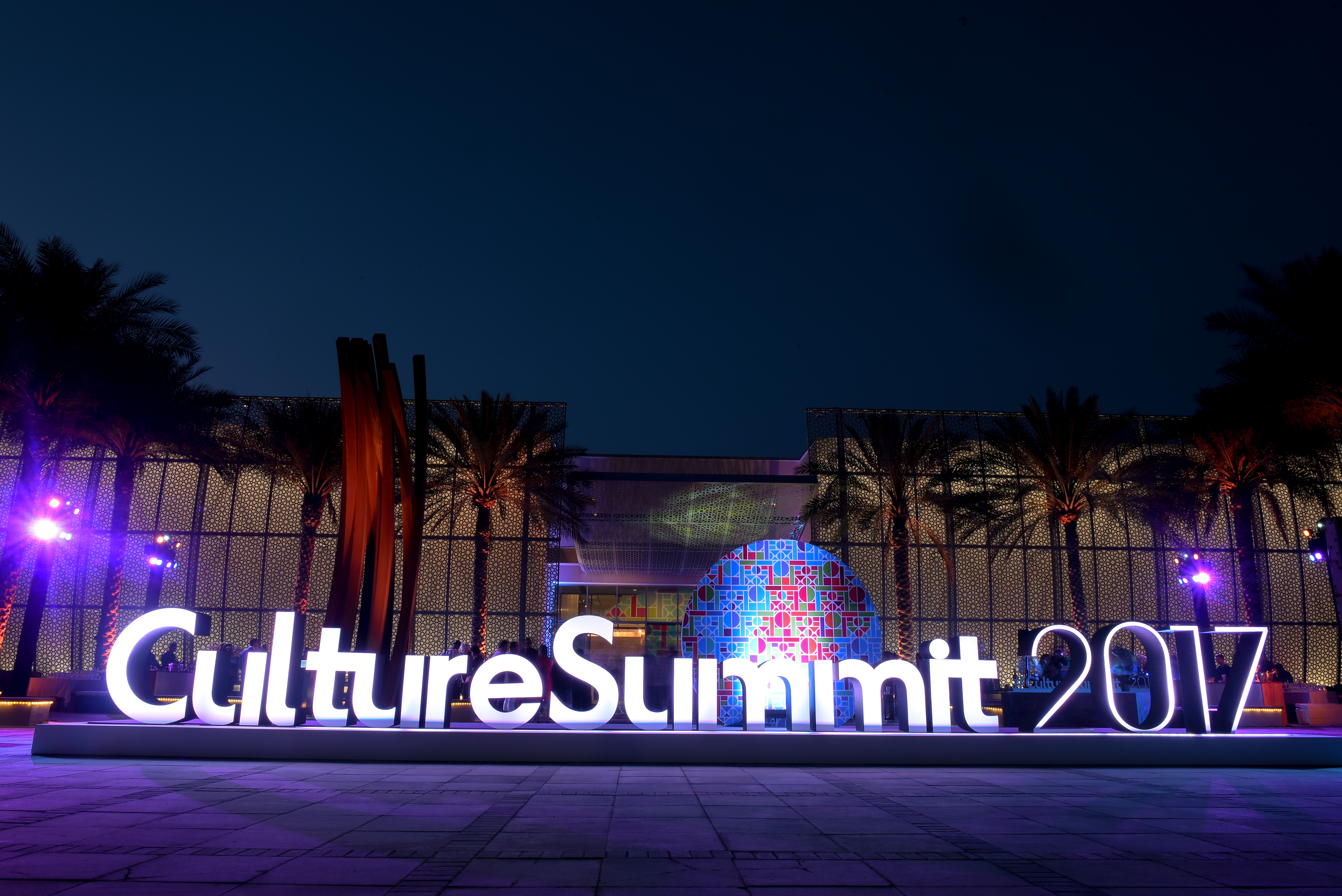
CultureSummit 2017 in Abu Dhabi, UAE.

Culture Summit Abu Dhabi is a summit that convenes leaders from the worlds of the arts, media, public policy, and technology.

It was organized and produced by The Rothkopf Group (TRG) and The Canales Project Ventures (TCPV), along with the Abu Dhabi Department of Culture & Tourism.

From 2019 onward, the summit has been fully organized and hosted by DCT Abu Dhabi. Culture Summit Abu Dhabi is now organized by the Department of Culture and Tourism – Abu Dhabi (DCT Abu Dhabi), in partnership with global institutions such as UNESCO, the Design Museum, and the Recording Academy. DCT Abu Dhabi leads all programming, planning, and execution for the summit.

Culture Summit 2018 took place at Saadiyat Island, Abu Dhabi, UAE, throughout April 8-12, 2018, and was focused on the theme of “Unexpected Collaborations.”

The most recent edition, held from 27–29 April 2025, explored the theme “Culture for Humanity and Beyond,” focusing on how culture can foster resilience, address global challenges, and be shaped by rapid technological advances such as artificial intelligence. Earlier editions focused on themes such as “A Matter of Time” (2024), with an expanding agenda on heritage, creativity, and cross-disciplinary dialogue.

== Organization ==
The Summit was planned with an intention of being the "Davos of Culture" and a place "to highlight the power of collective imagination as a force for good."

== Participants ==
The 2017 inaugural event was attended by 450 delegates from 80 countries, including internationally acclaimed visual artist Idris Khan, Academy Award-winning composer and conductor Tan Dun, former United States Secretary of State Madeleine Albright, MacArthur Fellow and award-winning choreographer Liz Lerman, His Excellency Dr. Anwar Gargash, UAE Minister of State for Foreign Affairs, and His Excellency Dr. Zaki Anwar Nusseibeh, UAE Assistant Minister of Foreign Affairs and International Cooperation. It was however, criticized for excluding a lot of local Emirati artists. CultureSummit 2017 hosted representatives from the following organizations:

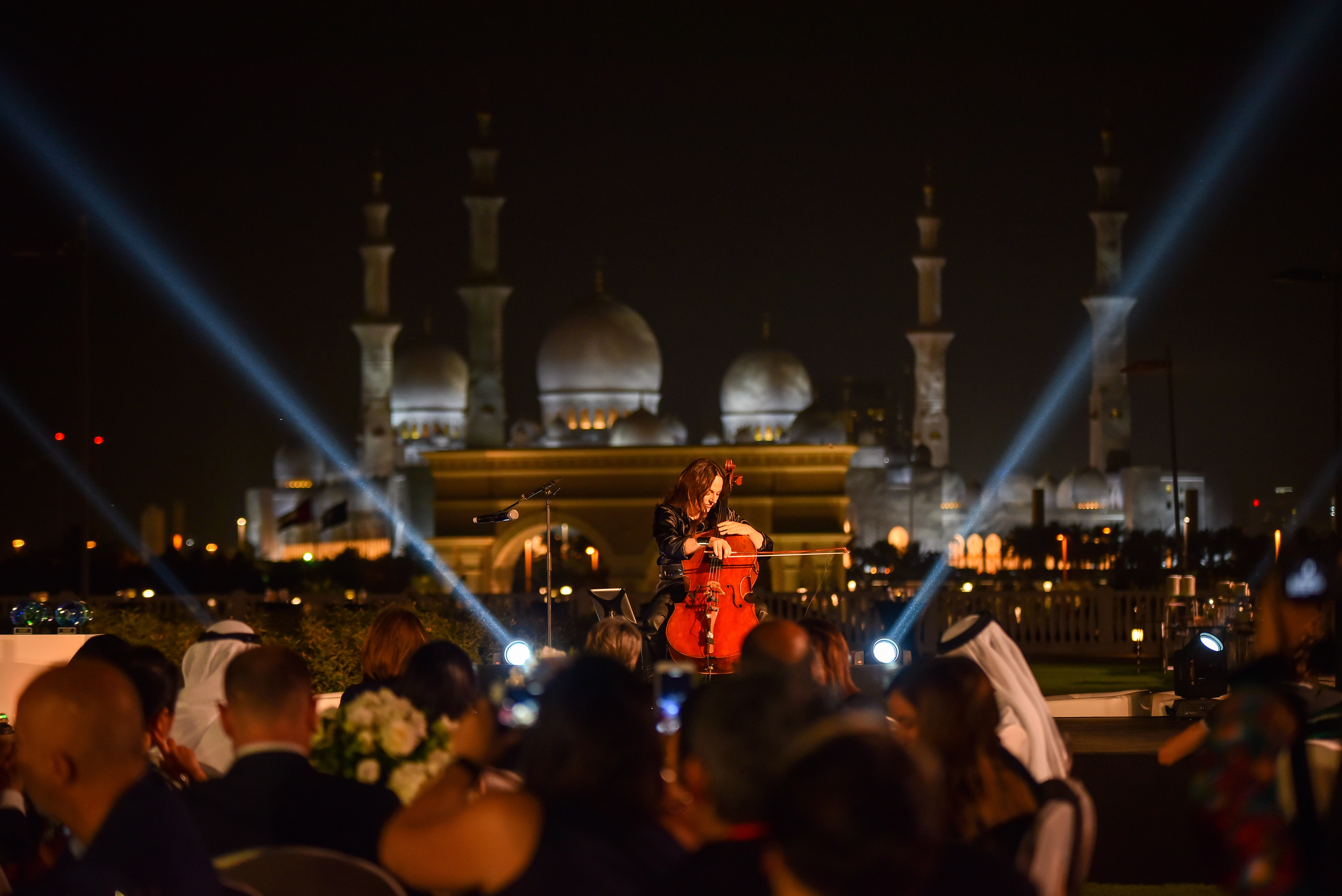
A woman plays the cello in front of Sheikh Zayed Mosque at CultureSummit 2017 in Abu Dhabi, UAE.

- Abu Dhabi Music & Arts Foundation
- Arab Fund for Arts and Culture
- Bahrain Authority on Culture and Antiquities
- China National Symphony Orchestra
- Culture Connect
- El Sistema
- Ford Foundation
- Found Sound Nation
- International Music Council
- John F. Kennedy Center for the Performing Arts
- New York University Abu Dhabi Arts Center
- Sesame Workshop
- Solomon R. Guggenheim Foundation
- Art Basel/Tate Modern
- UNESCO
- Vienna Boys' Choir
- Weill Center for Music, Carnegie Hall
- West–Eastern Divan Orchestra

== History of the Summits ==
The inaugural summit took place in 2017 and was intended to serve as a “Davos of Culture, bringing together creative and policy leaders to explore how culture can be a force for positive change.

- 2017: The first edition was attended by around 450 delegates from 80 countries, including visual artist Idris Khan, composer Tan Dun, former U.S. Secretary of State Madeleine Albright, choreographer Liz Lerman, and UAE ministers Dr. Anwar Gargash and Dr. Zaki Anwar Nusseibeh.
- 2018: Held 8–12 April at Saadiyat Island, themed “Unexpected Collaborations.” The program featured performances and exhibits by artists including the European Union Youth Orchestra and Abu Dhabi’s Bait Al Oud musical academy.
- 2019: The summit returned under the theme “Cultural Responsibility & New Technology.” Sessions explored the role of AI, immersive media, and other technologies in the cultural sector.
- 2020: Cancelled due to the COVID-19 pandemic.
- 2021 (Virtual Edition): Conducted online with the theme “The Cultural Economy and the Economy of Culture.” Organized in partnership with UNESCO, it examined the impact of the pandemic on cultural economies worldwide.
- 2022: Held 23–25 October at Manarat Al Saadiyat with the theme “A Living Culture.” It featured discussions on sustainability and cultural heritage in a rapidly changing world.
- 2023: Held 29–31 October with the theme “A Matter of Time.” Over 1,150 participants from 90 countries attended, including partnerships with UNESCO, Google Arts & Culture, the Design Museum, and the Guggenheim.
- 2024: Held 3–5 March 2024, under the theme “Cultural Collaborations in a Changing World.”
- 2025: Held 27-29 April under the theme “Culture for Humanity and Beyond”.
