= Jantsankhorol Erdenebayar =

Mongolian artist (born 1992)

- Born: 1992 (age 33–34); Ulaanbaatar, Mongolia
- Education: UCLA
- Parents: Erdenebayar Monkhor (father); Munkhtsetseg Jalkhaajav (mother)
- Website: www.jantsankhorol.com

Jantsankhorol Erdenebayar (Mongolian: Эрдэнэбаярийн Жанцанхорол), also known as Jantsa, is a Mongolian multidisciplinary artist based in Los Angeles, California.

== Early life and career ==
Jantsankhorol Erdenebayar was born in 1992 in Ulaanbaatar, Mongolia into a family of artists. His father Erdenebayar Monkhor (Монхорын Эрдэнэбаяр) is a renowned Mongolian painter and his mother Munkhtsetseg Jalkhaajav (Жалхаажавын Мөнхцэцэг) is an acclaimed multidisciplinary artist. He studied sculpture and received his bachelor's degree in 2015 from Hunter College, City University of New York and his master's degree in 2019 from the University of California, Los Angeles.

In 2015, Jantsakhorol held his first solo exhibition titled Hybrid Resistance at the Zanabazar Museum of Fine Arts, Mongolia. The following year, he completed two art residencies, one at Tropical Lab -10, LASALLE College of the Arts, Singapore and another one at Swatch Art Peace Hotel, Shanghai, China. In 2017, he was awarded by Alliance Francaise de Mongolie to participate in a residency program at 59 Rivoli Artist Studios, Paris, France.

In 2019, Jantsakhorol was invited to participate in the 58th La Biennale Di Venezia. He was commissioned by Gantuya Badamgarav, the curator of Mongolia Pavilion, to create site-specific sculptures. Titled A Temporality, the exhibition consisted of Jantsa's life-sized installations formed out of plastic and raw construction materials accompanied by a sound piece made by Carsen Nicolai (also known as Alva Noto) in collaboration with Mongolian throat singers. The exhibition garnered much deserved media attention and has been cited as one of the must visit pavilions of the 58th La Biennale di Venezia.

== Notable exhibitions ==
=== Solo exhibitions ===
- 2015 Hybrid Resistance, at Zanabazar Museum of Fine Arts, Ulaanbaatar, Mongolia

=== Group exhibitions ===
- 2019 A Temporality, Mongolia Pavilion at the 58th Venice Biennale, Italy
- 2018 Ulaanbaatar International Art Festival, organized by the Union of Mongolian Artists
- 2017 Beyond Heaven and Earth: Mongolian Art in This Day and Age, at China Art Museum, Shanghai
- 2017 Urban Nomadism-The Roof, at Liangzhu Village Cultural Art Center, Hangzhou, China
