= Munkhbolor Ganbold =

Mongolian artist (born 1983)

- Born: 1983 (age 42–43)
- Movement: Human Nature Love Freedom

Munkhbolor Ganbold (Mongolian: Ганболдын Мөнхболор), also known as Munkkh, is a Mongolian contemporary artist who was one of the participating artists of the Mongolia Pavilion — Lost in Tngri at the 57th La Biennale di Venezia.

== Early life and education ==
Munkkh was born in 1983 in Ulaanbaatar, Mongolia, and grew up during major shifts in Mongolia's society in 1990s. He obtained his education from Green Horse Mongolian Contemporary Art College, followed by Mongolian University of Fine Arts and Culture, Ulaanbaatar and later from Muthesius Fine Art College, Kiel, Germany.

== Сareer ==
After his study in Germany, Munkkh moved to Stockholm, where he stayed for 5 years. His first solo exhibitions appeared in Edsvik Konsthall, Sergels Torg and Gallery Haengmattan, Stockholm, Sweden. In 2012, he returned to Ulaanbaatar. Initially he joined Blue Sun Contemporary Art Group. Later in 2013, Munkkh together with his friends, multi-disciplinary artists Dorjderem Davaa, Davaajargal Tsaschikher and Gantulga Jargalnasan, established the Mongolian contemporary art movement, Human Nature Love Freedom. Until 2019, the group has been working together, showed 12 series of works in various public spaces and exhibition halls.

Since he moved to Mongolia, Munkkh's works have been displayed in Mongolia, the United States, Italy, Korea, Taiwan, China ad Germany. His works incorporates materials and objects found on the streets, construction sites and wasteland. Sometimes he destroys his works, uses torn pieces for the collage. In 2017, he was invited to represent Mongolia at the 57th La Biennale di Venezia. Titled Karma of Eating (2016), Munkhbolor's installation was about "the damages on the Mongolian ecosystem, especially those caused by the overbreeding of goats for the cashmere business".

== Notable exhibitions ==
=== Solo exhibitions ===
- 2023 Works, Khan Gallery, Ulaanbaatar, Mongolia
- 2019 Dream of Blue Grass, Mathias Kuper Gallery, Stuttgart, Germany
- 2017 Dream of Blue Grass, at Art Space 976+, Ulaanbaatar, Mongolia
- 2015 Adjective, at Art Space 976+, Ulaanbaatar, Mongolia

=== Group exhibitions ===
- 2024 Beta+, MOCA, Taipei, Taiwan
- 2022 Art Week, Ulaanbaatar, Mongolia
- 2021 Sierra of Creation, Gallery of William Paterson University, NJ, USA
- 2018 In/Is Land, at Kuandu Museum of Fine Art, Taipei, Taiwan
- 2018 Beyond Heaven and Earth: Mongolian Art in This Day and Age, at China Art Museum, Shanghai, China
- 2018 Urban Implosion, International Exhibition, Asia Culture Center, Gwangju, South Korea
- 2013 Amalgamated, at Gallery MC, New York, USA
