= Davaajargal Tsaschikher =

Mongolian sound artist and vocalist (born 1988)

- Born: 1988 (age 37–38); Ulaanbaatar, Mongolia
- Movement: Human Nature Love Freedom

Davaajargal Tsaschikher (Mongolian: Цасчихэрын Даваажаргал), also known as Davaa, is a Mongolian sound artist and the lead vocalist of the experimental rock band Mohanik.

== Life and education ==
Davaajargal Tsaschikher was born in 1988 in Ulaanbaatar, Mongolia. He studied at the University of Finance and Economics, Mongolia and graduated in 2012 with a bachelor's degree.

== Musical career ==
In 2004, along with his friends, Davaajargal started the band Mohanik. Since its conception, Mohanik has become one of the most respected and recognized bands in Mongolia. They won "Best Vocals" and "Best Performance of the Year" at the 2008 Mongolian Underground Music Awards. The next year, they entered the Mongolian music competition, Universe Best Songs, and came in third place. The same year, they won "Best Underground Band of the Year" at the 2009 Mongolian Underground Music Awards In 2011, Mohanik won in two categories, "Best Idea" and "Best Music Video" in rock and alternative genre at the Mongolian Music Video Awards. The band was featured in a 2015 documentary film Live from UB by Lauren Knapp which "explores the small but vibrant rock scene in Mongolia’s capital, Ulaanbaatar. The documentary "follows Mohanik through the process of recording their new album and their attempts to blend rock influences from outside with Mongolia’s unique nomadic cultural heritage and connection to the land". Mohanik has performed internationally in China, Russia, and South Korea.

== Artistic career ==
From 2012, Davaajargal has started to work as a sound artist and became a member of the Mongolian art movement Human Nature Love Freedom. In 2015, he was selected with 5 other artists to represent Mongolia at the 57th La Biennale di Venezia. His work Reexist (2017), a sound piece of just over ten minutes that mixes noises from nature as well as traditional and electronic music" was featured as part of the Mongolia Pavilion titled Lost in Tngri (Lost in Heaven).

== Notable group exhibitions ==
- 2018 Is/In Land, Mongolian-Taiwanese Contemporary Art Exchange Project, at Kuandu Museum of Fine Arts, Taipei, Taiwan
- 2017 Lost in Tngri, at Mongolia Pavilion at the 57th La Biennale di Venezia, Venice, Italy

== Discography (Mohanik) ==
- 2026 Awakening II
- 2025 Awakening I
- 2015 At Amarbayasgalant
- 2009 100-n Undaa
