= Nathalie Daoust =

Canadian photographer and artist

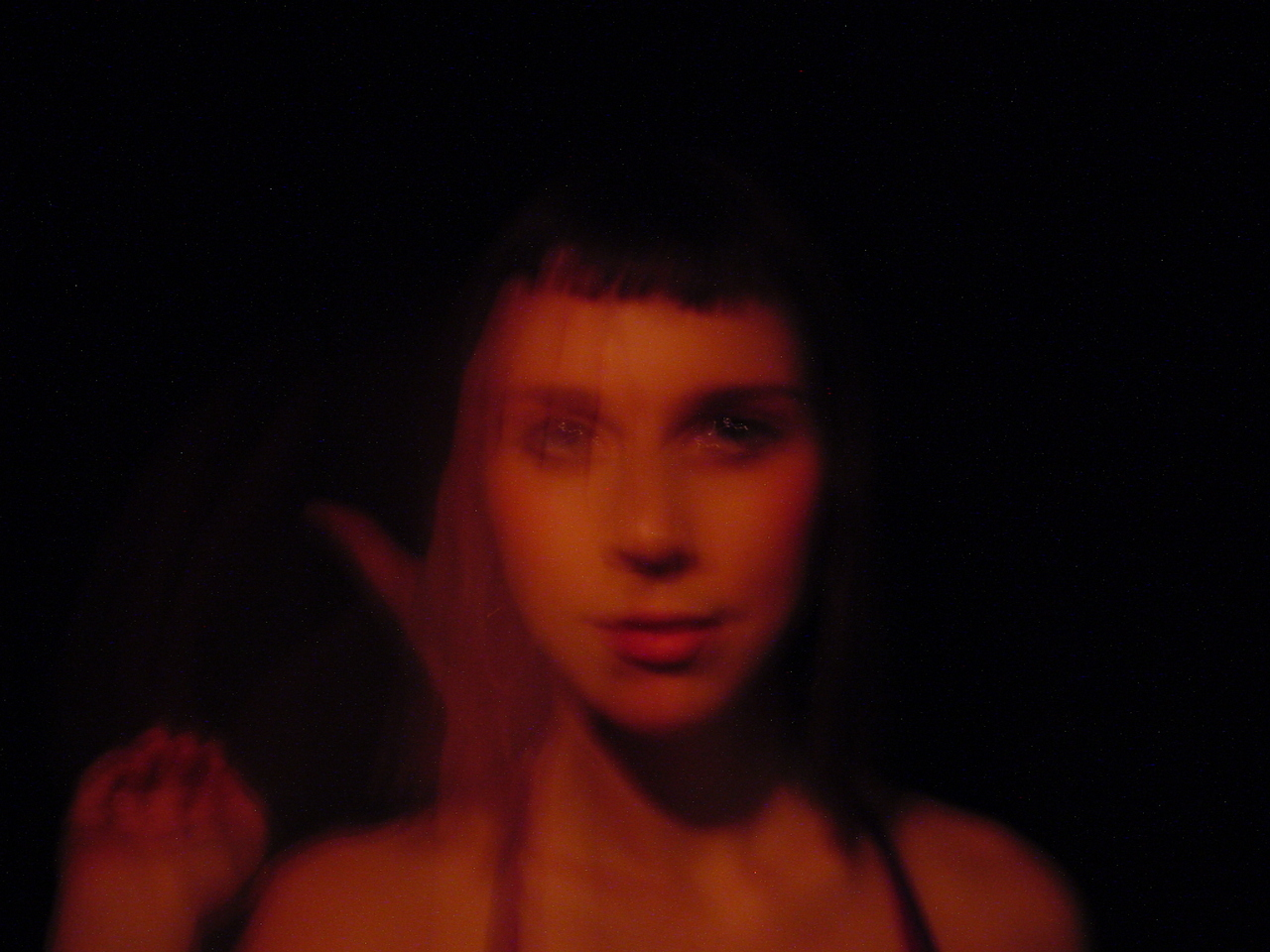
- Daoust in 2003
- Born: 31 March 1977 (age 49); Montreal, Quebec, Canada
- Occupations: Photographer, artist
- Years active: 2000–present
- Spouse: Jonathan Deane Douglas-Scott-Montagu (m. 2014)

Nathalie Daoust (born March 31, 1977) is a Canadian photographer and contemporary artist.

== Biography ==
Daoust studied photography at the Cégep du Vieux Montreal (1994–1997). Upon graduating, she moved to New York City, where she spent two years inhabiting and photographing the uniquely themed rooms of the Carlton Arms Hotel. These images comprise her first book, New York Hotel Story, published in 2002. New York Hotel Story introduces many of the themes she grapples with in subsequent works, including identity, gender, sexuality, time and memory, and escapism.

Her photographs focus on exposing hidden desires and dreams, frequently manifested in the margins of society. Too often this margin is inhabited by women, as many of her projects attest. From portraits of female sex workers in Brazil and Japan, to the role of women in contemporary Chinese society, Daoust explores the darker side of the construction of female identity.

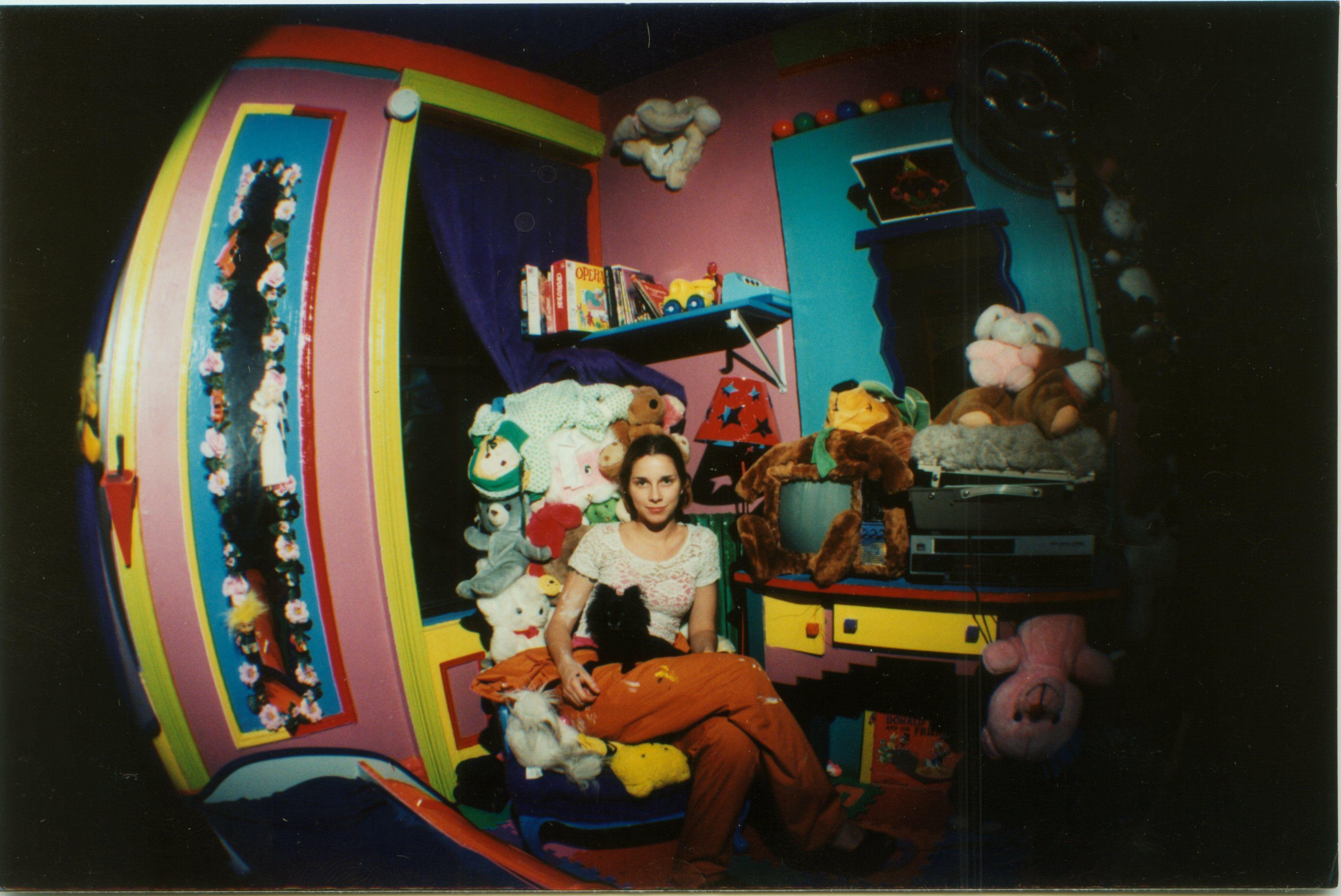
Room 11b Carlton Arms

Daoust is led by her desire to understand the human impulse to construct experiences that allow us to live, for at least a moment, in a fictive world. From female dominatrices at a Japanese S&M hotel in Tokyo Hotel Story, to one man’s decision to discard his own identity in favour of another's in Impersonating Mao, her work inhabits the liminal space between fiction and truth. Her most conceptually complex project to date, Korean Dreams, explores the ideological manifestation of a fantasy. While traveling through North Korea she observed the manipulation of reality on a national scale, capturing the layers of forced illusion perpetuated by the North Korean government.

Employing a variety of means to address her subjects, Daoust's technique plays a crucial role in communicating content. She employs non-digital techniques so that the process of creating the image itself contributes to her conceptual explorations.

On 4 October 2014, Daoust married Jonathan Douglas-Scott-Montagu, a biochemist who is the younger half-brother of Lord Montagu of Beaulieu. Nathalie Daoust is currently working on her new project about Mongolia. She aims to portrait the Mongolian nomadic families who are forced to abandon completely their way of life and move to the capital due to the effects of global warming and modernisation. These local tribes from the steppe have wiped out their livestock in the last increasingly severe winters, and are now settling into the Ger district, a "tent city" made of Yurts in Ulaanbaatar. These vast neighbours nowadays represent 62% of the population of the capital.

== Projects ==
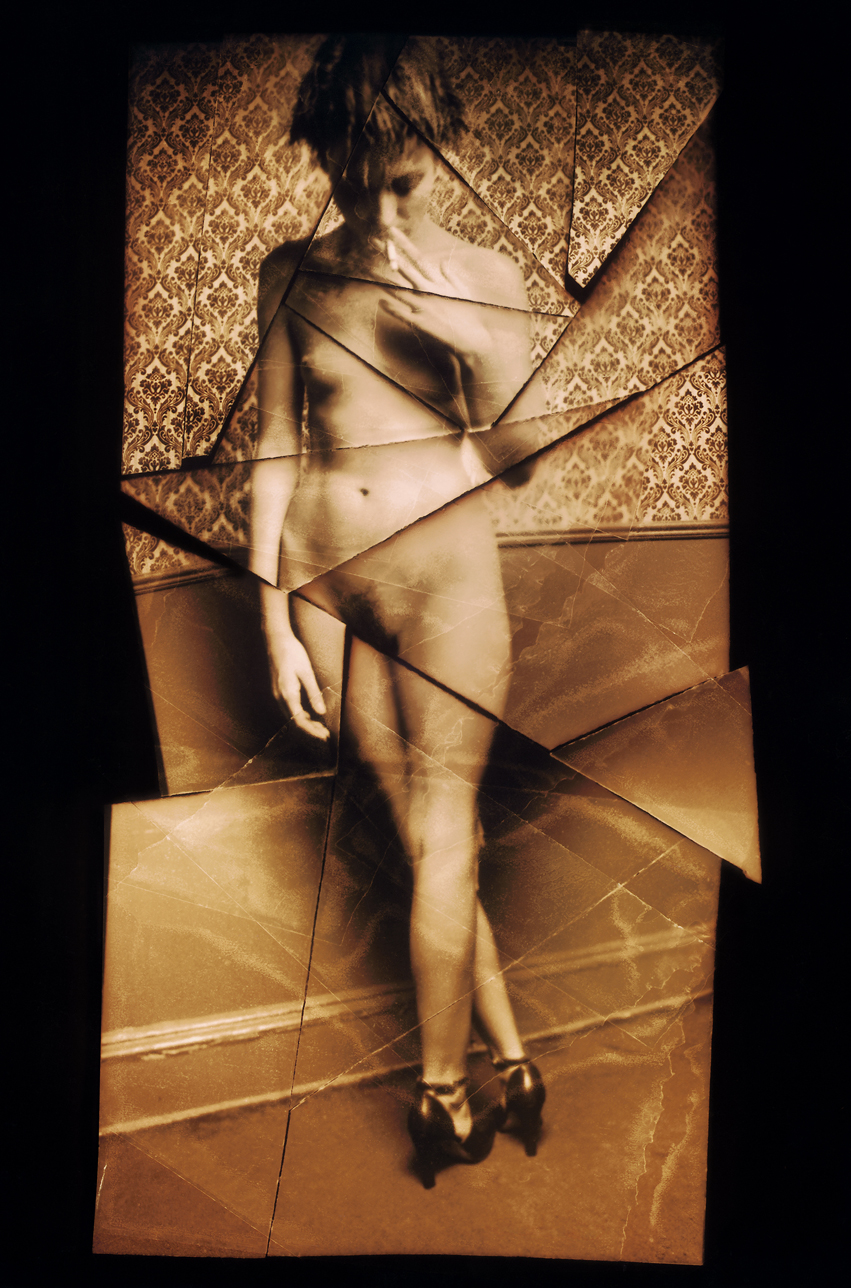
New York Hotel Story, USA

New York Hotel Story

In 1997 Daoust was invited to decorate a room in the Carlton Arms Hotel in New York City – a hotel that, for the past 40 years, has invited artists such as Banksy, Andre Charles and Paco Simone to transform its rooms and walls. Daoust created a ‘childhood dreamland’ crowded with games and plush animals and fully painted in Crayola-bright colours. After completing her room, Daoust was inspired to live in the Carlton Arms Hotel, intending to explore it photographically. For the following two years, she stayed alternately in every room to absorb each artist’s singular universe. The resultant images explore the interaction between subject and closed environment, engaging with the uncertainty of self as each room becomes a microcosmic world. These photos were published in a book of the same name in 2002.

Tokyo Girls

Tokyo Girls is an animation-like picture series capturing 30 women from around the world, united in Japan to perform striptease. Photographed using lenticular technology – a technique that imparts the illusion of movement – the women seem to dance, vamp and primp, caught in a perpetual loop of seduction and solicitation. While their fate could seem melancholy, the dancers have a certain frivolity, epitomized by the woman who winks coyly while performing her dance.

Despite sharing the same occupation, each portrait represents a unique individual. Photographed against a white backdrop, the women are able to tell their own stories by communicating via movement and expression. Daoust does not allow them to become stereotypes, but lets them reveal the conscious artifice of their trade.

Entre Quatre Murs, Berlin

Focusing on the construction of female identity, Entre Quatre Murs, Berlin, is a series of compositions involving women and space. Each image is a composite of elements, separated from the original photograph and printed on layers of transparent orthochromatic film. By superimposing these layers, the image is reconstituted three-dimensionally.

This sequence of three-dimensional portraits transparentizes the female body, as Daoust interweaves her subjects with their surroundings until the distinction between self and environment almost disappears. By dissolving these confines dividing external and interior, the scenes reflect and suggest a microcosmic snapshot of the mind.

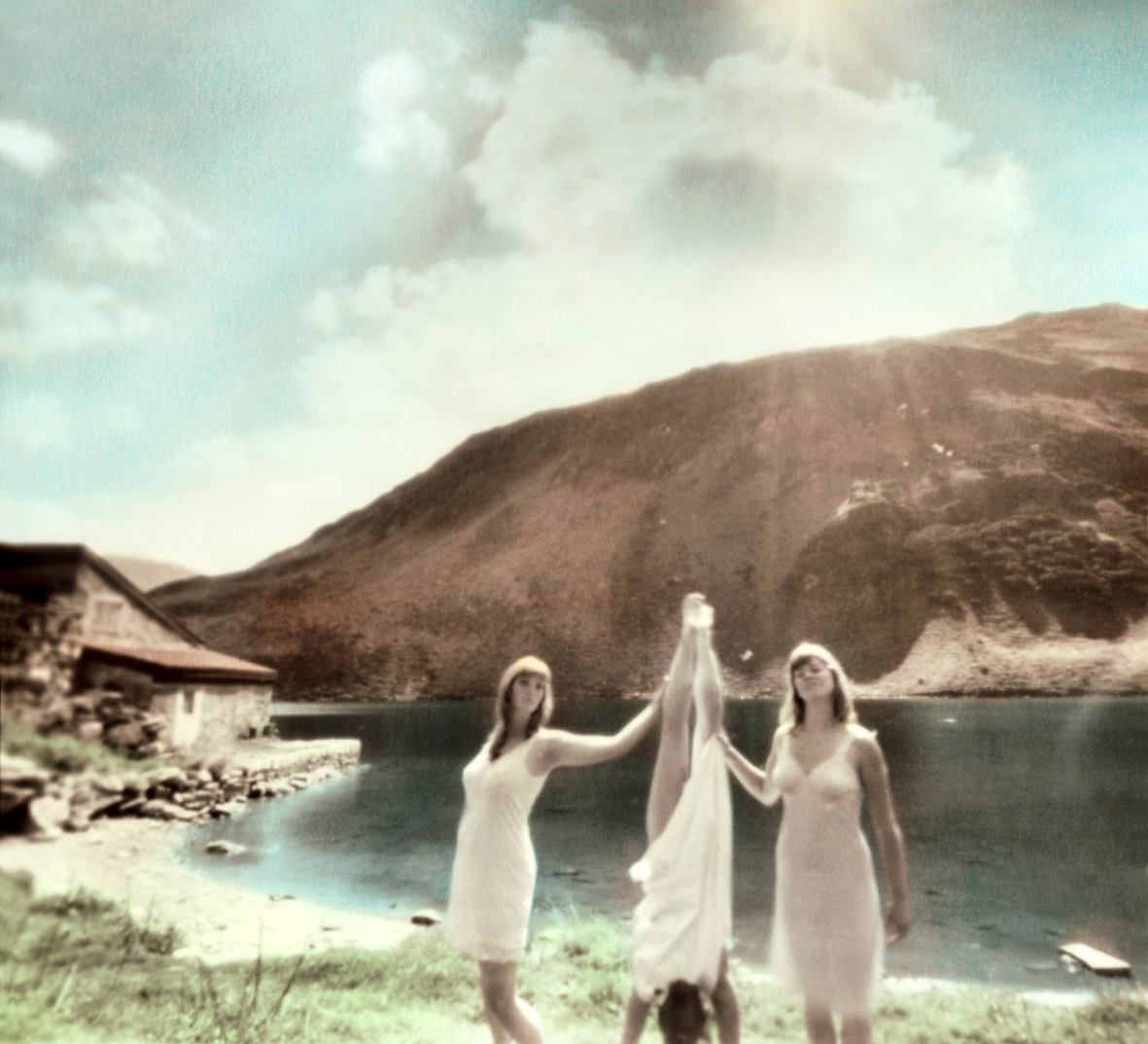
Frozen In Time, Switzerland

Street Kiss, Brazil

In Street Kiss, Daoust has captured the living and working conditions of the female sex workers of the Nicacio brothel in Rio de Janeiro. The Nicacio is both a place of the quick, downmarket sex trade and a space decorated by artists; the girls who work there have also founded a fashion label, Daspu, to fund workers benefits for prostitutes.

As a female photographer Daoust disrupts the exchange between subject and traditional viewer, allowing these women to exist not as passive objects of the male gaze but as active participants in the creation of their gendered identity. In this way the women, the art, and the fight for dignity in life all come together.

Frozen in Time, Switzerland

This series of hand painted black and white pinhole images juxtaposes the idyllic scenery of the Swiss Alps with stiff female bodies.

These unidentified women are purposefully left ambiguous, and the landscape is punctuated with man-made elements

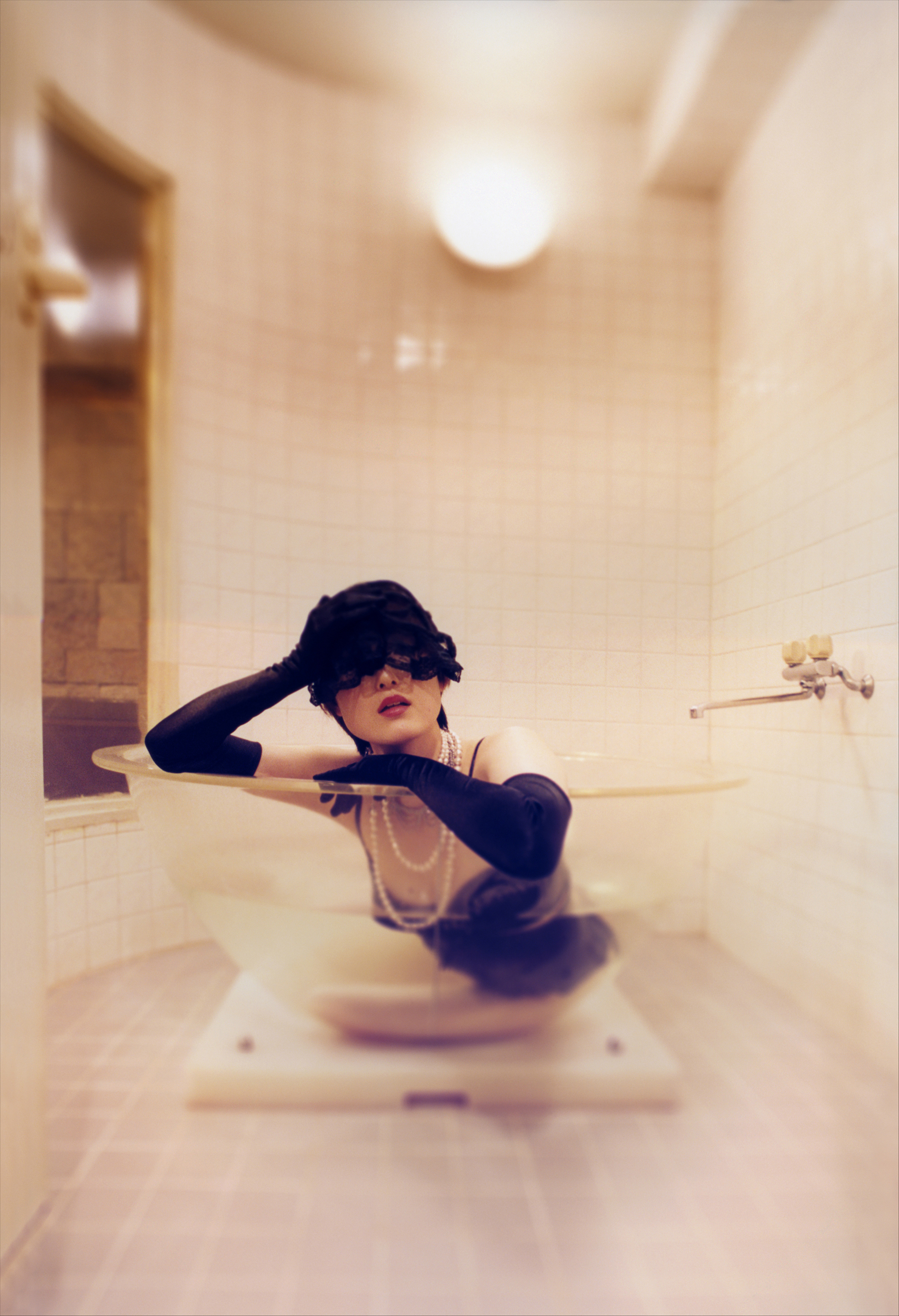
Tokyo Hotel Story, Japan

Tokyo Hotel Story

Tokyo Hotel Story continues Daoust's exploration of female sexuality and the subversion of gender stereotypes. Over a four-month period Daoust engaged with the dominatrices at one of Tokyo’s premier S&M love hotels, the Alpha-In. She photographed 39 women in their private rooms, surrounded by their equipment and dressed in the regalia that define their trade. This work takes the viewer beyond taboos, unveiling a universal human desire to escape reality, creating alternate worlds that oscillate between fantasy, truth and perversion.

Impersonating Mao, China

This photo-documentary captures the interior world of Zhang, a man who alternately appropriates the persona of Mao Zedong, founder of the People’s Republic of China. Shot on old Chinese film, the negatives were physically manipulated in the darkroom then sealed in amber-like resin to create an insubstantial world of illusion. Each scene is an arresting balance of soft and sharp, faded memory colliding with an insistent present. These images invite the viewer to reflect on notions of power and powerlessness, as a man seeks to make himself visible by taking on such a controversial persona.

China Dolls, China

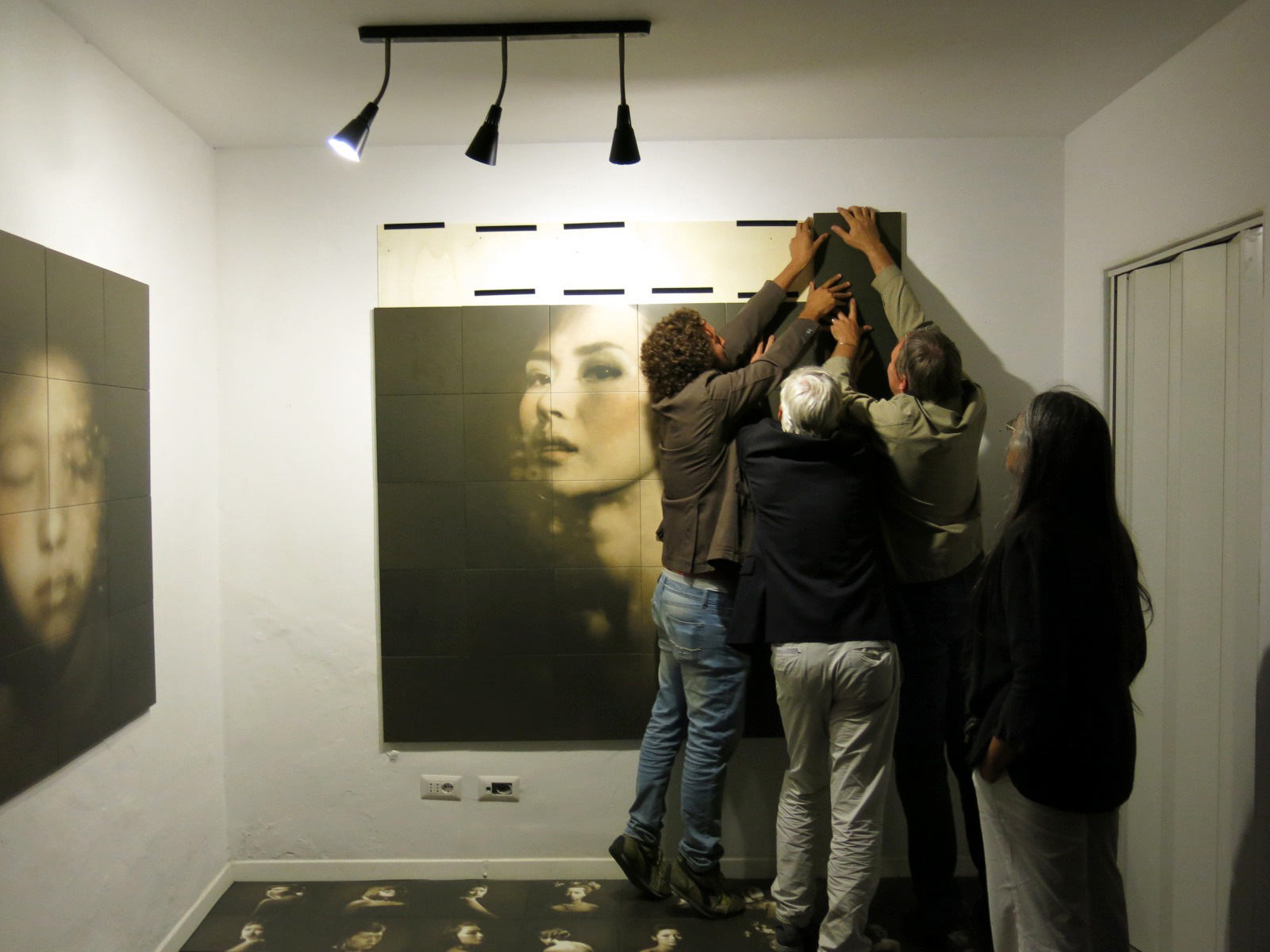
China Dolls, China

China Dolls is a study of contemporary Chinese women, the role they play in society and the consequences of the country's one child policy. Photographed individually in a darkened room, Daoust completely strips the scene of external signifiers, spotlighting women who have, according to the artist, “remained in shadows.” These lyrical, aborted tableaux personify the feelings of otherness and otherworldliness that run through her work.

Each black and white print is hand-coloured and printed on ceramic tile, reinforcing the notion of the ‘China Doll’ and reflecting the fragile situation of the modern Chinese woman.

Korean Dreams, North Korea

Korean Dreams, is a complex series that probes the unsettling vacuity of North Korea. Daoust's images reveal a country that seems to exist outside of time, as a carefully choreographed mirage. She has spent much of her career exploring the chimeric world of fantasy: the hidden desires and urges that compel people to dream, to dress up, to move beyond the bounds of convention and to escape from reality. With Korean Dreams, Daoust is exploring this escapist impulse not as an individual choice, but as a way of life forced upon an entire nation.

== Selected publications ==
New York Hotel Story (book, 2002)

Book ‘A Process’ Der Greif magazine, Germany

Twill magazine, France

1814 magazine, USA

European Photography Magazine, Germany

Drome magazine, Italy

Art Le Sabord magazine, Canada

Front magazine, Canada

Border Crossings art magazine, Canada

Vice magazine, USA

Elephant Magazine, UK

AnOther Magazine, UK

Spiegel Magazine, Germany

PHOTO magazine, France

Dry Magazine, Denmark

El País, Spain

Silvershotz magazine, Australia

PhotoEd magazine, Canada

PhotoArt magazine, Czech Republic

Helsingin Sanomien, Finland

The Bite Magazine, UK

NY Arts magazine (2006), USA

British Journal of Photography (2003), England

La Presse (2003), Canada

Eyemazing magazine (2014), The Netherlands

Art World Magazine (2013), China

Fine Art Photo magazine (2010), Germany

Vision magazine (2010), China

Dp Arte Fotográfica (2018), Portugal

PhotoWorld magazine (2008), China

Zoom photography magazine (2008), Italy
