= Mongol zurag =

Mongolian painting style

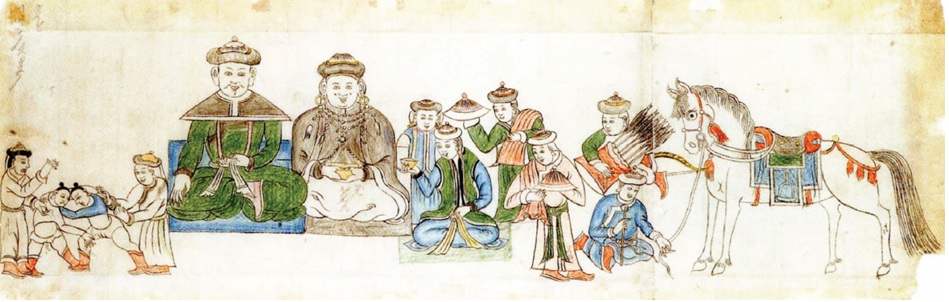
A 16th-century painting of Abtai Sain Khan and his queen in the zurag style

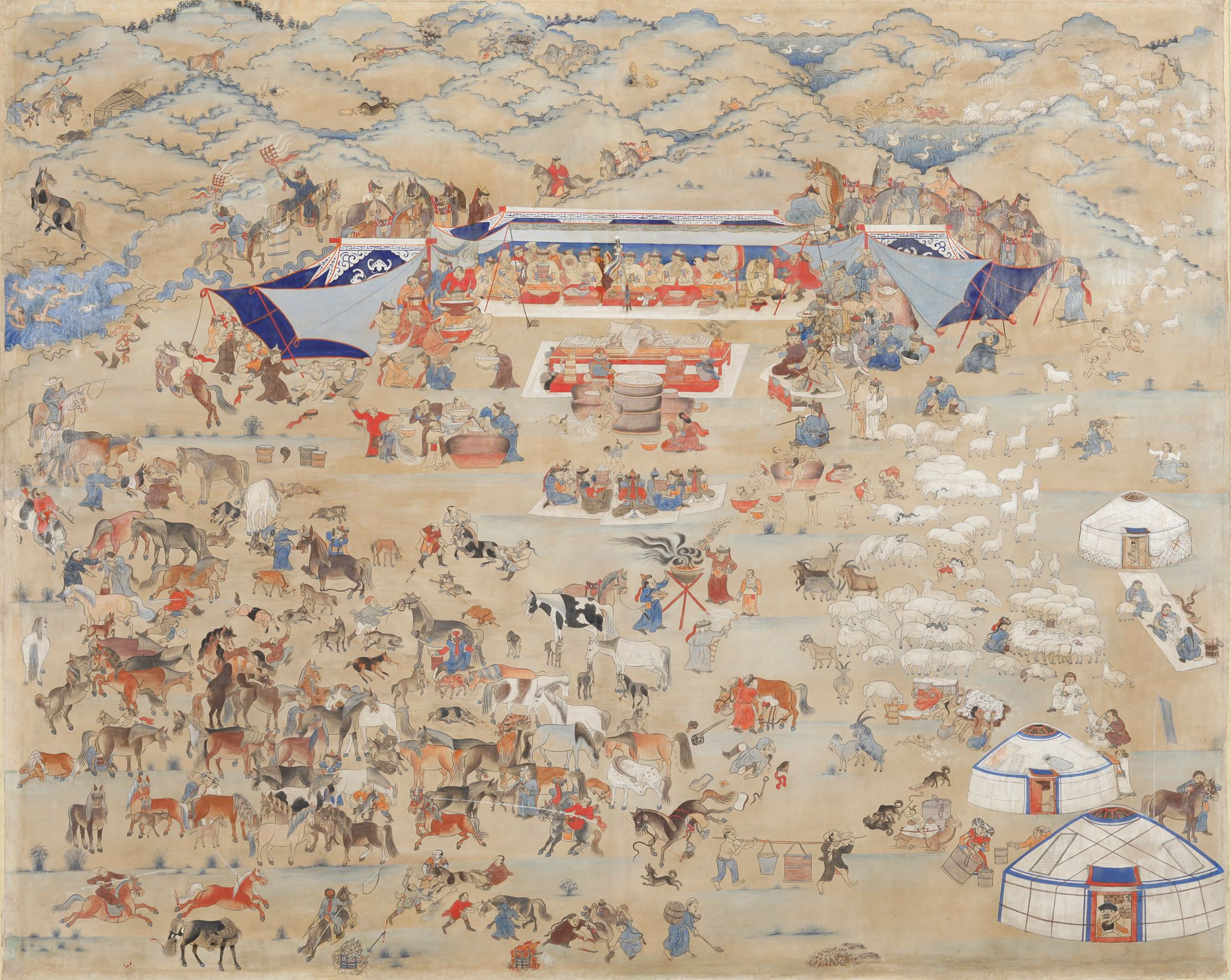
A Day in Mongolia: Summer, Tempera on cotton 138 cm x 177 cm

Mongol zurag (Mongolian: Mонгол зураг, Mongol painting) is a style of painting in Mongolian art. Developed in the early 20th century, zurag is characterised by the depiction of secular, nationalist themes in a traditional mineral-paint–on–cotton medium similar to Tibetan thangka. It is thus distinguished from both traditional Buddhist fine art and the socialist realism favoured during the Mongolian People's Republic.

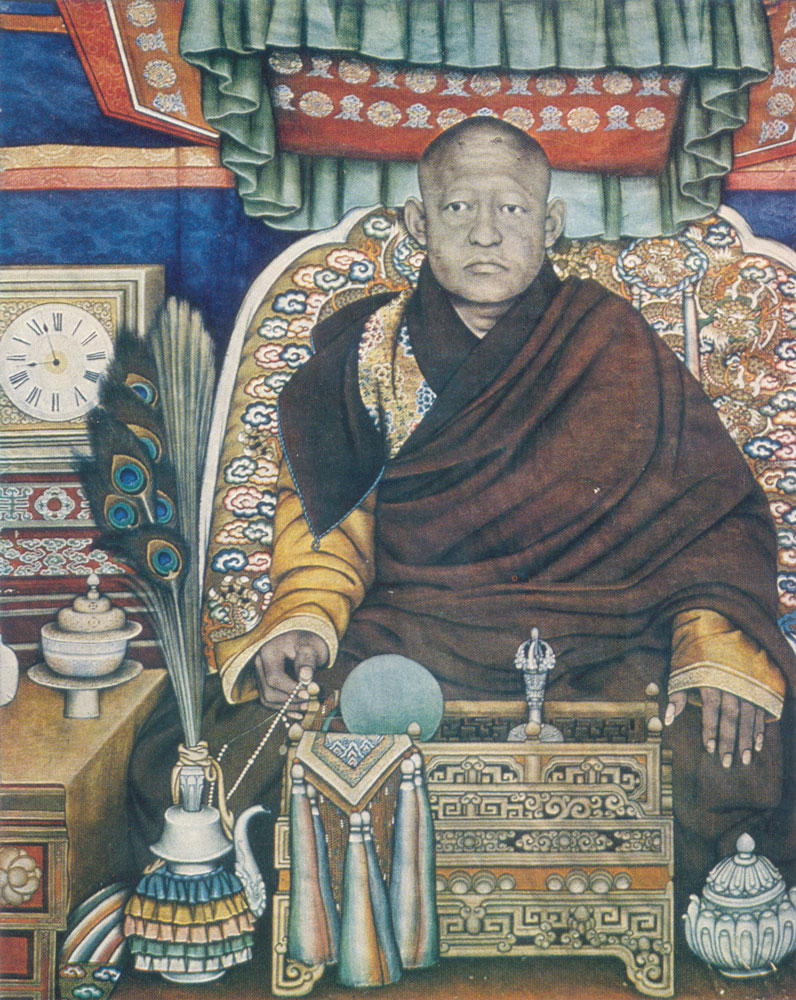
Portrait of Bogdo Gegen VIII, artist Baldugiin Sharav (fragment)

The style was pioneered in the aftermath of the 1921 Revolution by artists such as Balduugiin Sharav, whose One Day in Mongolia remains one of the most celebrated works of Mongolian art. Zurag paintings featuring scenes from everyday life, in both contemporary collective farm and traditional pastoral nomadic settings, became popular in the 1950s and 1960s in the wake of the success of Ürjingiin Yadamsüren's The Old Fiddler. Historical depictions of the 1921 Revolution as well as earlier national figures were also popular, but overtly religious themes were discouraged by the state. Since the establishment of democracy in 1992 there has been a resurgence of interest in the style. Recent zurag paintings have featured nationalistic scenes drawn from the Secret History of the Mongols and the life of Genghis Khan, as well overtly religious imagery inspired by pre-Buddhist shamanism. They have also become more symbolic and less strictly representational.

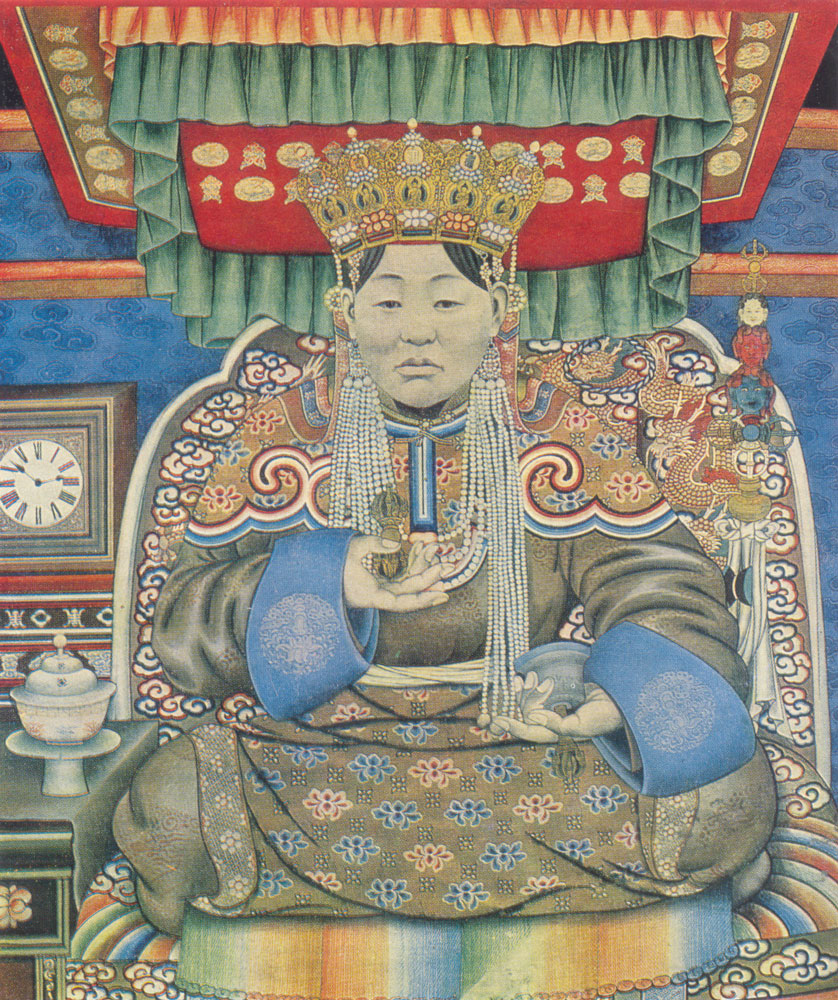
Ikh Dagina Dondogdulam, wife of 8th Jebtsundamba Khutugtu

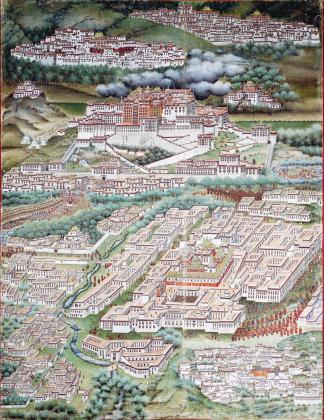
Lhasa; Painting by B. Sharav, Early 20th century

Throughout its history zurag has encompassed a diverse range of visual styles. Flat, brightly coloured shading in the Buddhist tradition is used alongside European-style realism and geometric perspective. Some zurag artists co-opted older Buddhist iconographic conventions for purely secular topics.
