= Ming treasure voyages =

Maritime voyages between 1405 and 1433

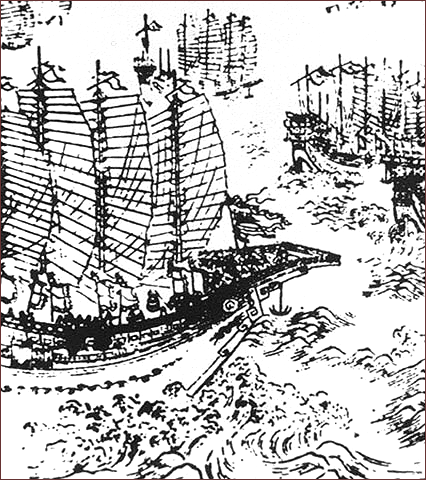
- Several of Zheng He's ships as depicted in the Wubei Zhi, dated to the early 17th century
- Traditional Chinese: 鄭和下西洋
- Simplified Chinese: 郑和下西洋
- Literal meaning: [Voyages of] Zheng He down the Western Ocean
Transcriptions
Standard Mandarin
- Hanyu Pinyin: Zhèng Hé Xià Xīyáng
Southern Min
- Hokkien POJ: Tēⁿ Hô Hā Se-iûⁿ

Ming China's treasure fleet undertook maritime expeditions between 1405 and 1433. The Yongle Emperor ordered the construction of the fleet in 1403. The grand project resulted in seven far-reaching ocean voyages to the coastal territories and islands of the South China Sea and Indian Ocean. Admiral Zheng He was commissioned to command the fleet for the expeditions. Six of the voyages occurred during the Yongle Emperor's reign (r. 1402–1424) and the seventh voyage occurred during the Xuande Emperor's reign (r. 1425–1435). The first three voyages reached up to Calicut on India's Malabar Coast, while the fourth voyage went as far as Hormuz in the Persian Gulf. In the last three voyages, the fleet traveled up to the Arabian Peninsula and East Africa.

The Chinese expeditionary fleet was heavily militarized and carried great amounts of treasures, which served to project Chinese power and wealth to the known world. They brought back many foreign ambassadors whose kings and rulers were willing to declare themselves tributaries of China. During the course of the voyages, they destroyed Chen Zuyi's pirate fleet at Palembang, captured the Sinhalese Kotte kingdom of King Alakeshvara, and defeated the forces of the Semudera pretender Sekandar in northern Sumatra. The Chinese maritime exploits brought many countries into China's tributary system and sphere of influence through both military and political supremacy, thus incorporating the states into the greater Chinese world order under Ming suzerainty. Moreover, the Chinese restructured and established control over an expansive maritime network in which the region became integrated and its countries became interconnected on an economic and political level.

The Ming treasure voyages were commanded and overseen by the eunuch establishment whose political influence was heavily dependent on imperial favor. Within Ming China's imperial state system, the civil officials were the primary political opponents of the eunuchs and the opposing faction against the expeditions. Near the end of the maritime voyages, the civil government gained the upper hand within the state bureaucracy, while the eunuchs gradually fell out of favor after the death of the Yongle Emperor and lost the authority to conduct these large-scale endeavors. Furthermore, local authorities and elites had economic interests antagonistic to the central state control of commerce, since the state-sponsored maritime enterprise had been key to counterbalancing localized private trade.

Over the course of these maritime voyages, Ming China became the pre-eminent naval power by projecting its sea power further to the south and west. There is still much debate regarding issues such as the actual purpose of the voyages, the size of the ships, the magnitude of the fleet, the routes taken, the nautical charts employed, the countries visited, and the cargo carried.

== Background ==
=== Creation of the fleet ===
Painting of the Yongle Emperor, dated to the Ming dynasty (National Palace Museum)

On 17 July 1402, in Ming China, Zhu Di, the Prince of Yan, ascended the throne as the Yongle Emperor. He inherited a powerful navy from his father, the Hongwu Emperor, and further developed it as an instrument for an expansive overseas policy. The Taizong Shilu contains 24 short entries for the imperial orders for shipbuilding, with figures pointing to at least 2,868 ships, from 1403 to 1419. Over the course of 1403, Fujian, Jiangxi, Zhejiang, and Huguang's provincial governments as well as Nanjing, Suzhou, and other cities' military garrisons were ordered to begin constructing ships.

Under the reign of the Yongle Emperor, Ming China underwent militaristic expansionism with ventures such as the treasure voyages. In 1403, he issued an imperial order to start the immense construction project of the treasure fleet. The fleet was known as the Xiafan Guanjun (下番官軍; 'foreign expeditionary armada'), its original designation, in Chinese sources. It came to comprise many trading ships, warships, and support vessels. The Longjiang shipyard was the construction site for many of the fleet's ships, including all of the treasure ships. It was located on the Qinhuai River near Nanjing, where it flows into the Yangtze River. Many trees were cut along the Min River and upper reaches of the Yangtze River to supply the necessary resources for the fleet's construction. Existing ships were also converted to serve in the fleet for the voyages, but this can only be said with certainty for 249 ships ordered in 1407.

The fleet's high-ranking officers, such as Admiral Zheng He, were from the eunuch establishment. Zheng served as the Grand Director in the Directorate of Palace Servants, a eunuch-dominated department, before his command of the expeditions. The emperor placed great trust in Zheng and appointed him to command the fleet. He even gave him blank scrolls stamped with his seal to issue imperial orders at sea. The other principal officers, such as Wang Jinghong, Hou Xian, Li Xing, Zhu Liang, Zhou Man, Hong Bao, Yang Zhen, Zhang Da, and Wu Zhong, were court eunuchs employed in the civil service. The rest of the crew was predominantly from the Ming military and mostly recruited from Fujian.

=== Regions ===
During the onset of the Ming treasure voyages, the Chinese treasure fleet embarked from the Longjiang shipyard and sailed down the Yangtze River to Liujiagang, where Zheng He organized his fleet and made sacrifices to the goddess Tianfei. Over the course of the following four to eight weeks, the fleet gradually proceeded to Taiping anchorage in Changle, where they waited for the favorable northeast winter monsoon (Note: Circa December and January (Dreyer 2007, 30; Mills 1970, 9)) before leaving the Fujian coast. The monsoon winds generally affected how the fleet sailed through the South China Sea and Indian Ocean. They reached the sea through the Wuhumen ('five tiger passage') of the Min River in Fujian. The port of Qui Nhon in Champa was always the first foreign destination that the fleet visited.

The voyages sent the fleet to the Western Ocean (西洋), which was the maritime region encompassing today's South China Sea and Indian Ocean during the Ming dynasty. More specifically, contemporary sources such as the Yingya Shenglan place the dividing line between the Eastern Ocean and Western Ocean at Brunei.

During the first three voyages from 1405 to 1411, the fleet followed the same basic maritime route: from Fujian to the first call in Champa, across the South China Sea to Java and Sumatra, up the Strait of Malacca to northern Sumatra for assembly of the fleet, across the Indian Ocean to Ceylon, then along the Malabar Coast to Calicut. At the time, the fleet sailed no further than Calicut. During the fourth voyage, the route was extended to Hormuz. During the fifth, sixth, and seventh voyages, the fleet traveled further to destinations in the Arabian Peninsula and East Africa. For the sixth voyage, the fleet sailed up to Calicut, where several detached squadrons proceeded to further destinations at the Arabian Peninsula and East Africa. For the seventh voyage, the fleet followed the route up to Hormuz, while detached squadrons traveled to other places at the Arabian Peninsula and East Africa.

== Course ==
=== First voyage ===
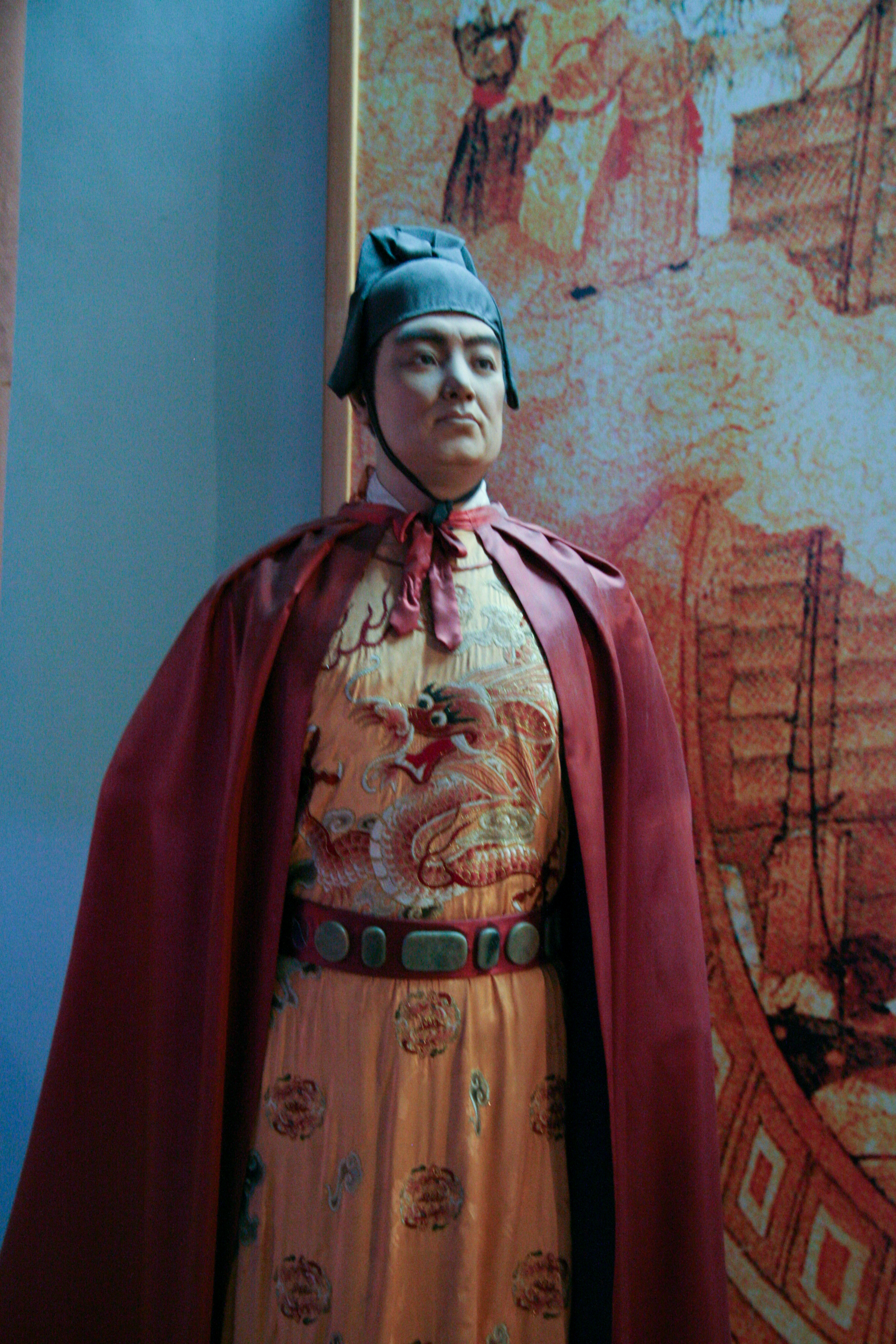
Wax statue of Admiral Zheng He (Quanzhou Maritime Museum)

In the third lunar month (30 March to 28 April) of 1405, a preliminary order was issued to Admiral Zheng He and others to lead 27,000 troops to the Western Ocean. An imperial edict, dated 11 July 1405, was issued containing the order for the expedition. It was addressed to Zheng He, Wang Jinghong, and others.

The Yongle Emperor held a banquet for the crew on the evening before the treasure fleet's maiden voyage. Gifts were presented to the officers and the common crew according to their rank. Sacrifices and prayers were offered to Tianfei, the patron goddess of sailors and seafarers, in the hopes of ensuring a successful journey and safe passage during the voyage. In the autumn of 1405, the fleet had assembled at Nanjing and was ready to depart from the city. According to the Taizong Shilu's entry for 11 July 1405 about the dispatch of the fleet, Zheng and "others" left on the first expedition "bearing imperial letters to the countries of the Western Ocean and with gifts to their kings of gold brocade, patterned silks, and colored silk gauze, according to their status". The fleet made a stop at Liujiagang. There, the fleet was organized in squadrons while the fleet's crew honored Tianfei with prayers and sacrifices. Then, the fleet sailed down the coast to Taiping anchorage in Changle near the Min River, where it awaited the northeast monsoon. The crew offered more prayers and sacrifices to Tianfei during their wait. Afterwards, the fleet departed via the Wuhumen.

The fleet sailed to Champa, Java, Malacca, Aru, Semudera, Lambri, Ceylon, Quilon, and Calicut. From Lambri, the fleet sailed straight through the Indian Ocean instead of following the Bay of Bengal coastline to Ceylon. Three days after their departure from Lambri, a ship split off and went to the Andaman and Nicobar Islands. Six days after the separation, the fleet saw the mountains of Ceylon and arrived at Ceylon's western coast two days later. They left this region as they were met with hostility from the local ruler, Alakeshvara. Dreyer (2007) states that it is possible that Zheng made port at Quilon—although there is no account confirming this—because the King of Quilon traveled with the fleet to China in 1407. Mills (1970) states that the fleet may have stayed four months at Calicut from December to April 1407. Around Cape Comorin on the southern tip of the Indian subcontinent, the fleet changed direction and began its return journey to China. During the return, the fleet stopped at Malacca again.

During the return trip in 1407, Zheng and his associates engaged Chen Zuyi and his pirate fleet in battle at Palembang. Chen had seized Palembang and dominated the maritime route along the Malaccan Strait. The battle concluded with the defeat of Chen's pirate fleet by the Chinese treasure fleet. Chen and his lieutenants were executed on 2 October 1407 when the Chinese fleet returned to Nanjing. The Ming court appointed Shi Jinqing as the Pacification Superintendent of Palembang, which established an ally there and secured access to its port.

The fleet returned to Nanjing on 2 October 1407. After accompanying the fleet during the return journey, the foreign envoys (from Calicut, Quilon, Semudera, Aru, Malacca, and other unspecified nations) visited the Ming court to pay homage and present tribute with their local products. The Yongle Emperor ordered the Ministry of Rites, whose duties included the protocol concerning foreign ambassadors, to prepare gifts for the foreign kings who had sent envoys to the court.

=== Second voyage ===
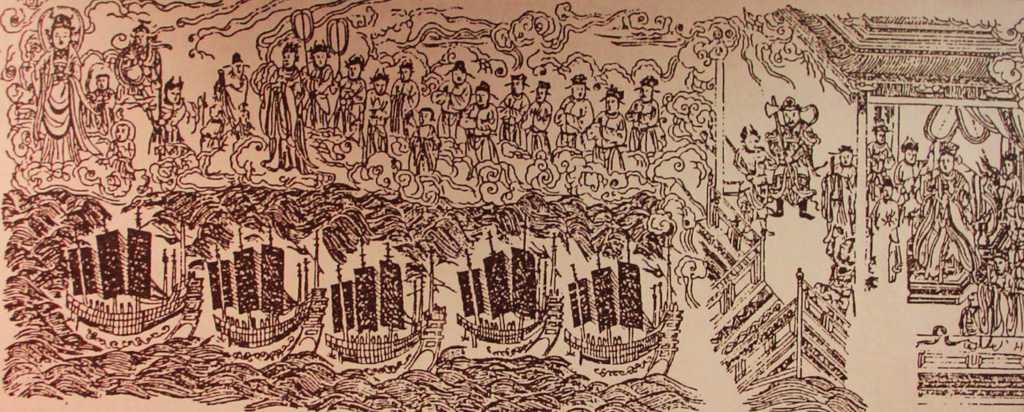
Zheng He's treasure ships as depicted in the Tianfei Jing (天妃經), dated to 1420 (C. Y. Tung Maritime Museum)

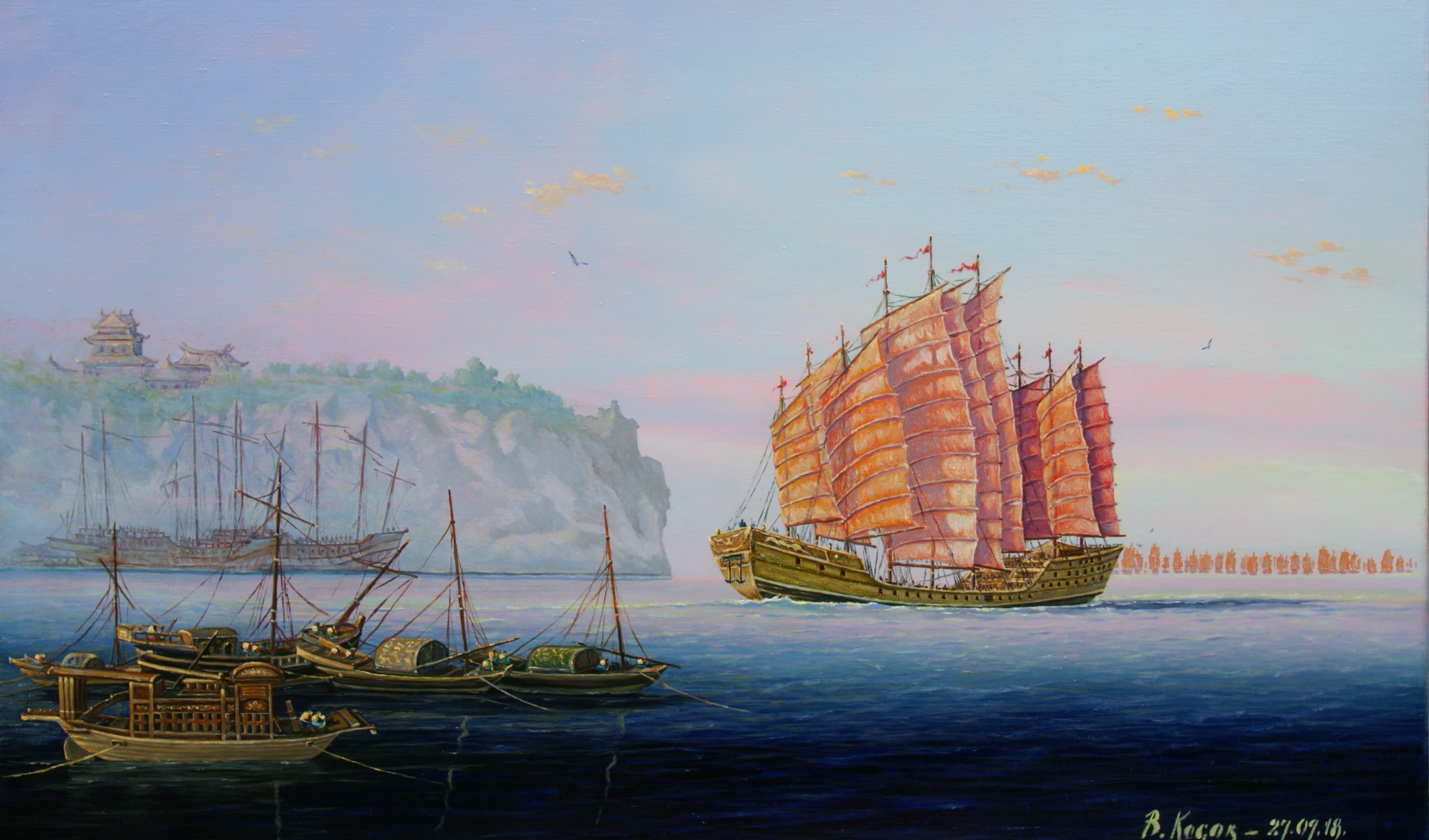
The Chinese treasure fleet as painted by Vladimir Kosov, dated 2018

The imperial order for the second voyage was issued in October 1407. (Note: In the Taizong Shilu, the imperial order is dated to 17 October 1408 (Dreyer 2007, 62; Duyvendak 1939, 361). In the Mingshi, this date is 7 October 1408 (Duyvendak 1939, 361). However, the imperial order is dated to 1407 in Zheng He's inscriptions and Ma Huan's book (Dreyer 2007, 62). After correction of the year in the former two works, the order date would be 23 October 1407 derived from the Taizong Shilu (Dreyer 2007, 62; Duyvendak 1939, 364) or 13 October 1407 derived from the Mingshi (Duyvendak 1939, 364).) The edict was addressed to Zheng He, Wang Jinghong, and Hou Xian (侯顯). Lang Ying's Qixiuleigao (七修類稿) records that Zheng, Wang, and Hou were dispatched in 1407. The Taizong Shilu records that Zheng and others went as envoys to the countries of Calicut, Malacca, Semudera, Aru, Jiayile, Java, Siam, Champa, Cochin, Abobadan, Quilon, Lambri, and Ganbali. (Note: The Mingshi states that Ganbali was a little country in the Western Ocean. It has traditionally been identified as Coimbatore, but Cambay in Gujarat or Cape Comorin may also be possible. (Dreyer 2007, 46 & 93–94))

On 30 October 1407, a grand director was dispatched with a squadron to Champa before Zheng followed with the main body of the treasure fleet. The fleet departed in the fifth year of the Yongle reign (late 1407 or possibly early 1408). The fleet traveled from Nanjing to Liujiagang to Changle. Then it sailed to Champa; Siam; Java; Malacca; Semudera, Aru, and Lambri on Sumatra; Jiayile, Abobadan, Ganbali, Quilon, Cochin, and Calicut in India. Dreyer (2007) states that it is possible that Siam and Java were visited by the fleet or by detached squadrons before regrouping at Malacca. During this voyage, the fleet did not land on Ceylon. The fleet was tasked to carry out the formal investiture of Mana Vikraan as the King of Calicut. A tablet was placed in Calicut to commemorate the relationship between China and India.

In this voyage, the Chinese forcibly settled the enmity between Ming China and Java. In a civil war on Java between 1401 and 1406, the King of West Java killed 170 members of a Chinese embassy who had come ashore in his rival's territory at East Java. (Note: Chan (1998, 271–272) gives a different account, stating that, during the second voyage between 1408 and 1409, the King of West Java killed 170 members of Zheng He's personnel who had come ashore on his rival's territory at East Java, so Zheng was forced to intervene militarily.) The entry dated to 23 October 1407 in the Ming Shilu states that the Western King of Java had sent an envoy to the Ming court to admit his guilt for mistakenly killing 170 Ming troops who had gone ashore to trade. It further states that the Ming court responded by demanding 60,000 liang of gold for compensation and atonement, warning that they would dispatch an army to punish the Javanese ruler for his crime if he failed to comply and stating that the situation in Annam (referring to Ming China's successful invasion of Vietnam) could serve as an example. The Chinese accepted the payment and apology, and restored diplomatic relations. Yan Congjian's Shuyu Zhouzilu notes that the emperor later forgave 50,000 liang of gold that was still owed from this as long as the western ruler was remorseful for his crime. Tan (2005) remarks that Zheng had submitted the case of the killings to the emperor for a decision, rather than undertake a military invasion in revenge, as the killings were not willful. The Chinese would use further voyages to keep surveillance over Java.

During the journey, as recorded by Fei Xin, the fleet visited the Pulau Sembilan in the Strait of Malacca in the seventh year of the Yongle reign (1409). Dreyer (2007) concludes that the stop was made during the return journey of the second voyage as the fleet did not leave the Chinese coast for the third voyage until early 1410. Fei wrote that "In the seventh year of Yongle, Zheng He and his associates sent government troops onto the island to cut incense. They obtained six logs, each eight or nine chi (Note: A zhang was ten chi and a chi was 10.5–12 inches (Dreyer 2007, 65).) in diameter and six or seven zhang in length, whose aroma was pure and far-ranging. The pattern [of the wood] was black, with fine lines. The people of the island opened their eyes wide and stuck out their tongues in astonishment, and were told that 'We are the soldiers of the Heavenly Court, and our awe-inspiring power is like that of the gods.'" The fleet returned to Nanjing in the summer of 1409.

The confusion of whether Zheng undertook the second voyage stems from the fact that a Chinese envoy was dispatched before he had departed with the main body of the fleet. The imperial edict for the third voyage was issued during the second voyage while the fleet was still in the Indian Ocean, so Zheng was either absent when the court issued the imperial order or he had not accompanied the fleet during the second voyage. On 21 January 1409, a grand ceremony was held in the honor of the goddess Tianfei, where she received a new title. Duyvendak (1938) thinks that Zheng could not have been on the second voyage, because the ceremony's importance required Zheng's attendance. Mills (1970), citing Duyvendak (1938), also states that he did not accompany the fleet for this voyage. However, Dreyer (2007) states that it is strongly suggested that Zheng had been on the second voyage, as Fei's account about the 1409 visit to Pulau Sembilan explicitly mentions him.

=== Third voyage ===
Straight-away, their dens and hideouts we ravaged,
And made captive that entire country,
Bringing back to our august capital,
Their women, children, families and retainers, leaving not one,
Cleaning out in a single sweep those noxious pests, as if winnowing chaff from grain...
These insignificant worms, deserving to die ten thousand times over, trembling in fear...
Did not even merit the punishment of Heaven.
Thus the august emperor spared their lives,
And they humbly kowtowed, making crude sounds and
Praising the sage-like virtue of the imperial Ming ruler.

— Yang Rong (1515) about the conflict in Ceylon

The imperial order for the third voyage was issued in the first month of the seventh year of the Yongle reign (16 January to 14 February 1409). It was addressed to Zheng He, Wang Jinghong, and Hou Xian.

Zheng embarked on the voyage in 1409. The Chinese treasure fleet departed from Liujiagang in the ninth month (9 October to 6 November 1409) and arrived at Changle the following month (7 November to 6 December 1409). They left Changle in the twelfth month (5 January to 3 February 1410). They proceeded via the Wuhumen. The fleet made stops at Champa, Java, Malacca, Semudera, Ceylon, Quilon, Cochin, and Calicut. They traveled to Champa within 10 days. Wang and Hou made short detours at Siam, Malacca, Semudera, and Ceylon. The fleet landed at Galle, Ceylon, in 1410.

During the homeward journey in 1411, the Chinese treasure fleet confronted King Alakeshvara of Ceylon. (Note: Dreyer (2007, 66 & 72–73) thinks the incident happened during the outward journey in 1410, but notes that most authorities think it happened during the homeward journey in 1411. Dreyer (2007, 72–73) also notes that Chinese sources make no mention when the confrontation exactly happened during the course of the third voyage.) Alakeshvara posed a threat to the countries and local waters of Ceylon and southern India. When the Chinese arrived at Ceylon, they were overbearing and contemptuous of the Sinhalese, whom they considered rude, disrespectful, and hostile. They also resented the Sinhalese for attacks and piracy against neighboring countries that had diplomatic relations with Ming China. Zheng and 2,000 troops traveled overland into Kotte, because Alakeshvara had lured them into his territory. The king separated Zheng and his men from the Chinese fleet anchored at Colombo, while he planned a surprise attack on the fleet. In response, Zheng and his troops invaded Kotte and captured its capital. The Sinhalese army, recorded to have over 50,000 troops, hastily returned and surrounded the capital, but were repeatedly defeated in battle by the Chinese troops. They took captive Alakeshvara, his family, and principal officials.

Zheng returned to Nanjing on 6 July 1411. He presented the Sinhalese captives to the Yongle Emperor, who decided to free and return them to their country. The Chinese dethroned Alakeshvara in favor of their ally Parakramabahu VI as the king with Zheng and his fleet supporting him. From then on, the fleet did not experience hostilities during visits to Ceylon.

=== Fourth voyage ===
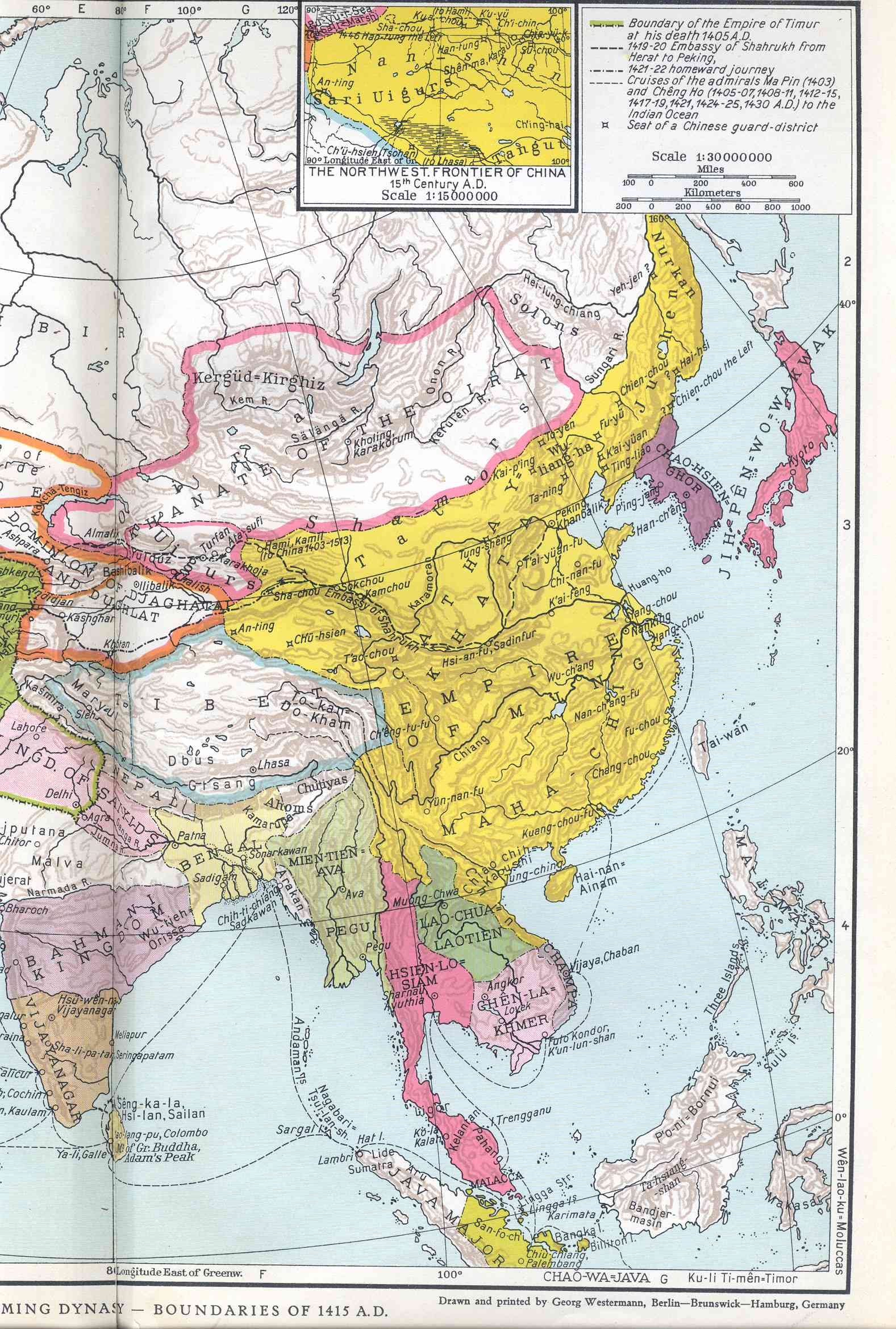
Ming China in 1415 as depicted in Albert Herrmann's Historical and Commercial Atlas of China, published in 1935

On 18 December 1412, the Yongle Emperor issued the order for the fourth voyage. Zheng He and others were commanded to lead it.

The emperor attended an archery contest for the Midsummer Festival of 1413 (5th day, 5th month, 11th year) that all the Chinese officials and foreign envoys were invited to. Duyvendak (1939) states that these envoys were so numerous that they most-likely comprised many of those whom Zheng escorted back to their countries during the fourth voyage rather than just close neighbors. This expedition led the Chinese treasure fleet into Muslim countries, so it must have been important for the Chinese to seek out reliable interpreters. The interpreter Ma Huan joined the voyages for the first time. A 1523 inscription at a mosque in Xi'an records that, on the 4th month of the 11th year, Zheng was there to seek reliable interpreters and found Hasan (哈三). Hasan was proficient in Arabic and went on this voyage.

The fleet left Nanjing in 1413, probably in the autumn. It set sail from Fujian in the 12th month of the 11th year in the Yongle reign (23 December 1413 to 21 January 1414). Calicut was the westernmost destination during the previous voyages, but the fleet sailed beyond it this time. The Taizong Shilu records Malacca, Java, Champa, Semudera, Aru, Cochin, Calicut, Lambri, Pahang, Kelantan, Jiayile, Hormuz, Bila, Maldives, and Sunla as stops for this voyage.

The fleet sailed to Champa, Kelantan, Pahang, Malacca, Palembang, Java, Lambri, Lide, Aru, Semudera, Ceylon, Jiayile (opposite Ceylon), Cochin; and Calicut. They proceeded to Liushan (Maldive and Laccadive Islands), Bila (Bitra Atoll), Sunla (Chetlat Atoll), and Hormuz. At Java, the fleet delivered gifts and favors from the Yongle Emperor. In return, a Javanese envoy arrived in China on 29 April 1415 and presented tribute in the form of "western horses" and local products while expressing gratitude.

In 1415, the fleet made a stop at northern Sumatra during the journey homeward. In this region, Sekandar had usurped the Semudera throne from Zain al-'Abidin, but the Chinese had formally recognized the latter as the King of Semudera. In contrast, Sekandar, an autonomous ruler, was not recognized by the Chinese. Zheng was ordered to launch a punitive attack against the usurper and restore Zain al-'Abidin as the rightful king. Sekandar and his forces, comprising reportedly "tens of thousands" of soldiers, attacked the Ming forces and were defeated by them. The Ming forces pursued Sekandar's forces to Lambri where they captured Sekandar, his wife, and his child. King Zain al-'Abidin later dispatched a tribute mission to express his gratefulness. This conflict reaffirmed Chinese power over the foreign states and the maritime route by protecting the local political authority that sheltered the trade. Sekandar was presented to the Yongle Emperor at the palace gate and later executed. It is not known when this execution happened, but Ma states that Sekandar was publicly executed in the capital after the fleet returned. Fei Xin describes Sekandar as a false king who robbed, stole, and usurped the throne of Semudera, Ma Huan portrays him as someone who attempted to overthrow the ruler, and the Ming Shilu records that Sekandar was the younger brother of the former king and plotted to kill the ruler.

On 12 August 1415, the fleet returned to Nanjing from this voyage. The Yongle Emperor was absent since 16 March 1413 for his second military campaign against the Mongols and had not returned when the fleet arrived. After the fleet's return, envoys bearing tribute from 18 countries were sent to the Ming court.

=== Fifth voyage ===
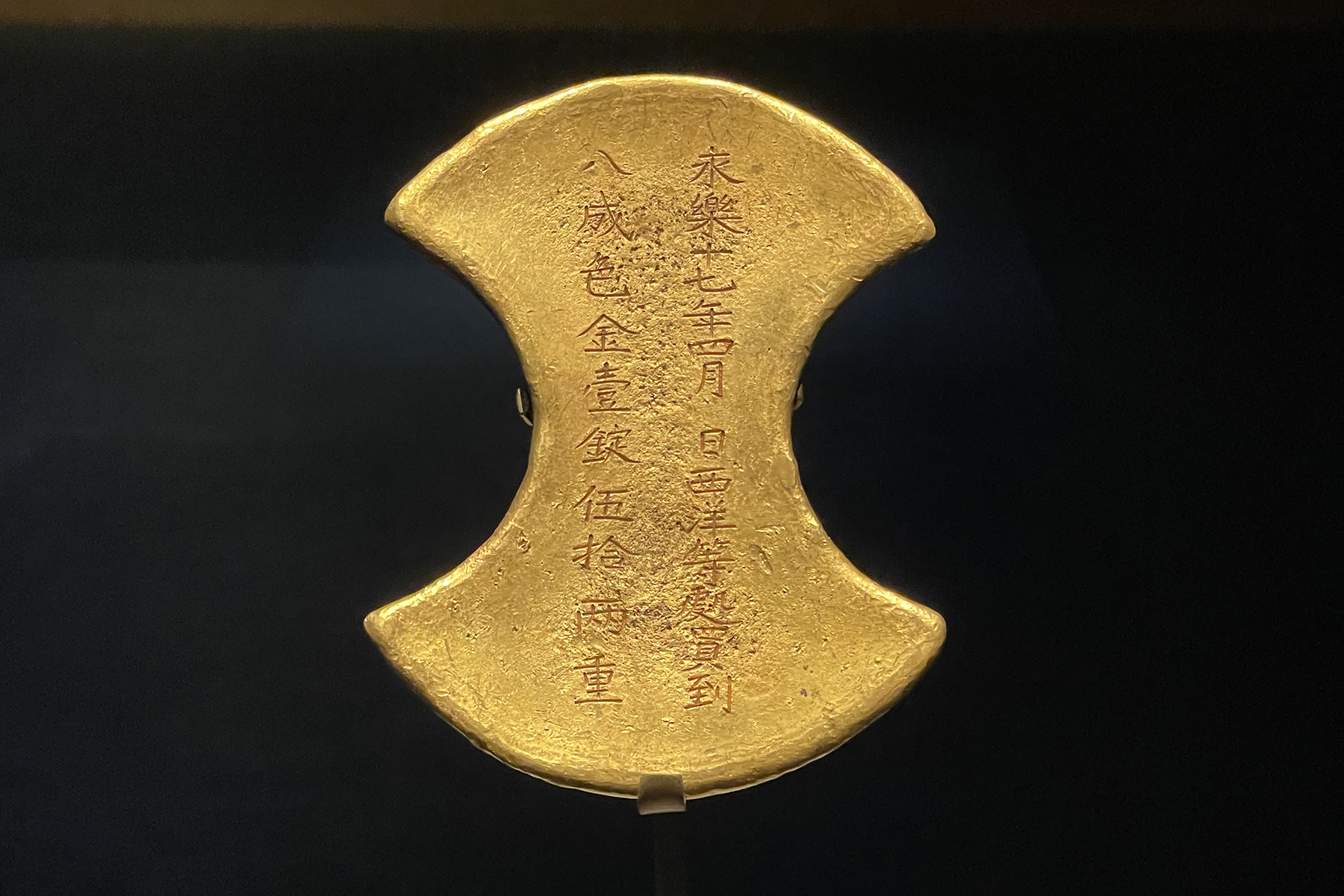
A gold ingot excavated from the tomb of Prince Zhuang of Liang, a son of the Hongxi Emperor, with an inscription stating that the ingot was made from gold purchased at the Western Ocean in the 17th year of the Yongle reign (1419), indicating that the gold was purchased in the fifth voyage (Hubei Provincial Museum)

On 14 November 1416, the Yongle Emperor returned to Nanjing. On 19 November, a grand ceremony was held where he bestowed gifts to princes, civil officials, military officers, and the ambassadors of 18 countries. (Note: The Taizong Shilu lists 19 names of countries for its 19 November and 28 December entries (Dreyer 2007, 82–83). However, the 19 names comprise 18 countries, because Lambri was listed twice, namely as Nanwuli and Nanpoli (Dreyer 2007, 82–83; Mills 1970, 13). The 18 countries were Champa, Pahang, Java, Palembang, Malacca, Semudera, Lambri, Ceylon, the Maldive Islands, Cochin, Calicut, Shaliwanni (possibly Cannanore), Hormuz, Lasa, Aden, Mogadishu, Brava, and Malindi (Mills 1970, 13).) On 28 December, the ambassadors visited the Ming court to take their leave and were bestowed robes before departure. That day, the emperor ordered the undertaking of the fifth voyage, the aim of which was to return the ambassadors and to reward their kings.

Zheng He and others received orders to escort the ambassadors back home. They carried imperial letters and gifts for several kings. The King of Cochin received special treatment because he had sent tribute since 1411 and later also sent ambassadors to request the patent of investiture and a seal. The Yongle Emperor granted him both requests, conferred to him a long inscription (allegedly composed by the emperor himself), and gave the title "State Protecting Mountain" to a hill in Cochin.

Zheng may have left the Chinese coast in the autumn of 1417. He first made port at Quanzhou to load up the treasure fleet's cargo holds with porcelain and other goods. Archaeological finds of contemporary Chinese porcelain have been excavated at the East African places visited by the fleet. A Ming tablet at Quanzhou commemorates Zheng burning incense for divine protection for the voyage on 31 May 1417. The fleet visited Champa, Pahang, Java, Palembang, Malacca, Semudera, Lambri, Ceylon, Cochin, Calicut, Shaliwanni (possibly Cannanore), Liushan (Maladive and Laccadive Islands), Hormuz, Lasa, Aden, Mogadishu, Brava, Zhubu, and Malindi. For Arabia and East Africa, the most likely route was Hormuz, Lasa, Aden, Mogadishu, Brava, Zhubu, and then Malindi. The Tarih al-Yaman fi d-daulati r-Rasuliya reports that Chinese ships reached the Aden coast in January 1419 and did not leave the Rasulid capital at Ta'izz before 19 March.

On 8 August 1419, the fleet had returned to China. The Yongle Emperor was in Beijing, but he ordered the Ministry of Rites to give monetary rewards to the fleet's personnel. The accompanying ambassadors were received at the Ming court in the eighth lunar month (21 August to 19 September) of 1419. Their tribute included lions, leopards, dromedary camels, ostriches, zebras, rhinoceroses, antelopes, giraffes, and other exotic animals. The arrival of the various animals brought by foreign ambassadors caused sensation at the Ming court.

Early in the fall of 1420, after the emperor announced the move of the capital to Beijing, he made arrangements for all foreign envoys to journey to the new capital for a celebration in early 1421.

=== Sixth voyage ===
The Taizong Shilu's 3 March 1421 entry notes that the envoys of sixteen countries (Hormuz and other countries) were given gifts of paper money, coin money, ceremonial robes, and linings before the Chinese treasure fleet escorted them back to their countries. The imperial order for the sixth voyage was dated 3 March 1421. Zheng He was dispatched with imperial letters, silk brocade, silk floss, silk gauze, and other gifts for the rulers of these countries.

Gong Zhen's Xiyang Fanguo Zhi records a 10 November 1421 imperial edict instructing Zheng He, Kong He (孔和), Zhu Buhua (朱卜花), and Tang Guanbao (唐觀保) to arrange the provisions for Hong Bao and others' escort of foreign envoys to their countries. The envoys of the 16 different states were escorted to their homelands by the fleet. It is likely that the first few destinations were Malacca and the three Sumatran states of Lambri, Aru, and Semudera. The fleet was divided into several detached squadrons at Semudera. All the squadrons proceeded to Ceylon, whereafter they separated for Jiayile, Cochin, Ganbali, or Calicut in southern India. The squadrons traveled from there to their respective destinations at Liushan (Maldive and Laccadive Islands), Hormuz at the Persian Gulf, the three Arabian states of Dhofar, Lasa, and Aden, and the two African states of Mogadishu and Brava. The eunuch Zhou (probably Zhou Man) led a detached squadron to Aden. Ma Huan mentions Zhou Man and Li Xing in connection to the visit of Aden. Their squadron may have also visited Lasa and Dhofar. According to the Mingshi, Zheng personally visited Ganbali as an envoy in 1421. Of the twelve visited nations west of Sumatra, this was the only one explicitly reported to have been visited by Zheng himself. Even though Quilon was not visited, the squadron for Mogadishu probably separated near Quilon as a navigation point while the main body of the fleet continued to Calicut. A large squadron proceeded further from Calicut to Hormuz. They may have traveled via the Laccadives.

Upon return, several squadrons regrouped at Calicut and all the squadrons regrouped further at Semudera. Siam was likely visited during the return journey. The fleet returned on 3 September 1422. They brought with them envoys from Siam, Semudera, Aden, and other countries, who bore tribute in local products. The foreign envoys, who traveled with the fleet to China, proceeded overland or via the Grand Canal before reaching the imperial court at Beijing in 1423.

On 31 January 1423, as reported in the Tarih al-Yaman fi d-daulati r-Rasuliya, the Sultan of the Rasulid issued an order to receive a Chinese delegation in the capital Ta'izz in February and goods were exchanged. This indicates that several Chinese ships did not return with the Chinese treasure fleet to China.

=== Nanjing garrison ===
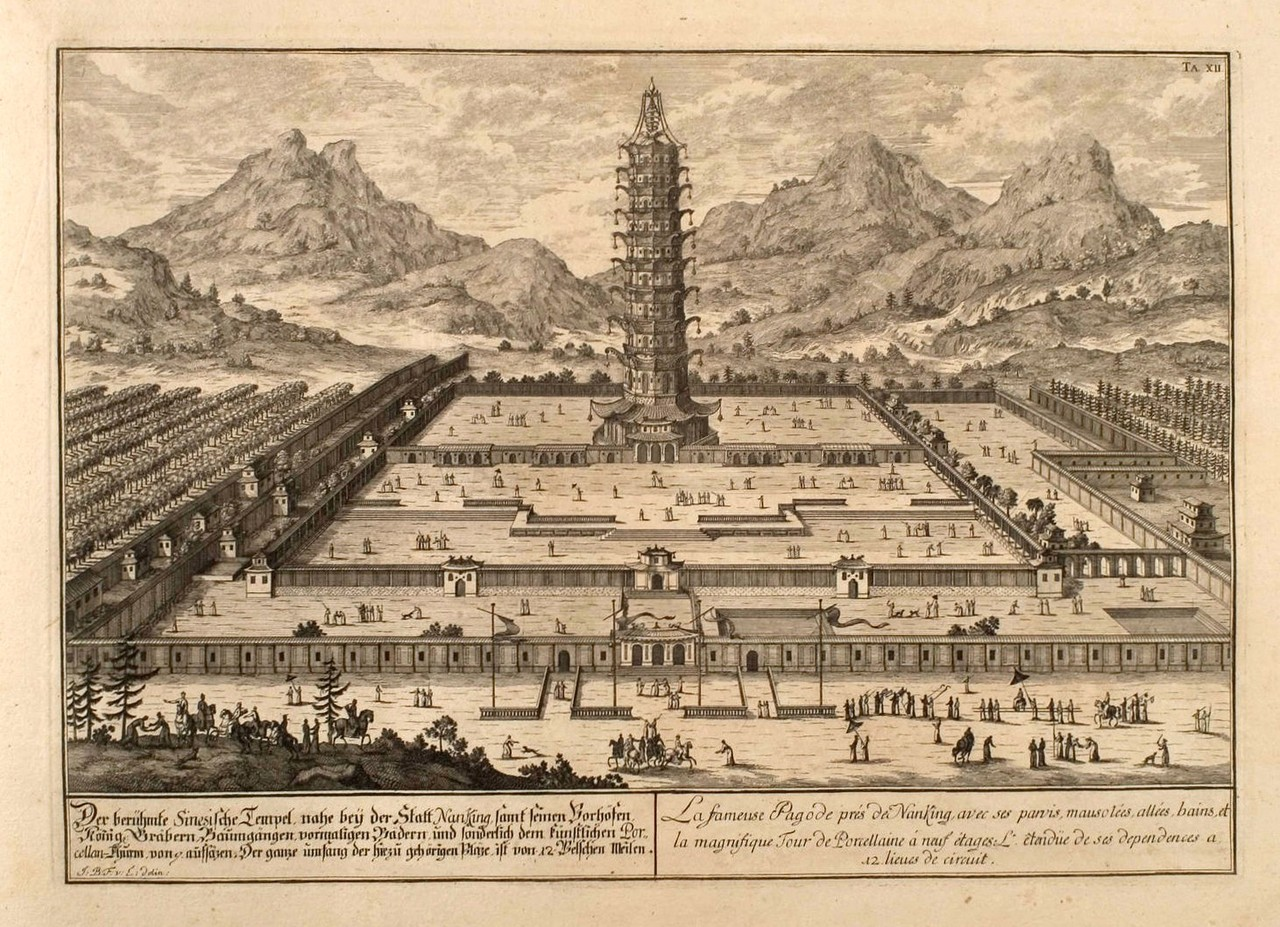
Great Bao'en Temple as depicted in Johann Bernhard Fischer von Erlach's A Plan of Civil and Historical Architecture, published in 1721

On 14 May 1421, the Yongle Emperor ordered the temporary suspension of the treasure voyages. (Note: On 9 May 1421, lightning struck the Yongle Emperor's palace in Beijing, causing the Fengtian, Huagai, and Jinshen Halls to be destroyed in a fire (Ray 1987b, 161–162). For his decision to discontinue the Indian Ocean expeditions, the emperor was influenced by views that this disaster was a bad omen and a sign against the voyages (Sen 2016, 612).) At the expense of the voyages, imperial attention and funding was diverted to the emperor's military campaigns against the Mongols. Between 1422 and 1431, the Chinese treasure fleet remained in Nanjing to serve in the city's garrison.

In 1424, Zheng He departed on a diplomatic mission to Palembang. (Note: The Taizong Shilu 27 February 1424 entry reports that Zheng He was sent to Palembang. The Xuanzong Shilu 17 September 1425 entry reports that Zhang Funama was sent to Palembang. The later Mingshi compilers seem to have combined these two accounts into one journey. (Dreyer 2007, 96)) Meanwhile, Zhu Gaozhi ascended the throne as the Hongxi Emperor on 7 September 1424 following the death of his father, the Yongle Emperor, on 12 August 1424. Zheng returned from Palembang after this death.

The Hongxi Emperor was against the undertaking of the voyages. On 7 September 1424, the day of his accession to the throne, he terminated the undertaking of further voyages. He kept the treasure fleet, which retained its original designation Xiafan Guanjun, to garrison Nanjing. On 24 February 1425, he appointed Zheng as the defender of Nanjing and ordered him to continue his command over the fleet for the city's defense. The Hongxi Emperor died on 29 May 1425 and was succeeded by his eldest son Zhu Zhanji as the Xuande Emperor. The Xuande Emperor left his father's arrangements in place, so the fleet remained as a part of the institutions in Nanjing.

On 25 March 1428, the Xuande Emperor ordered Zheng and others to supervise the rebuilding and repair of the Great Bao'en Temple in Nanjing. The construction of the temple was completed in 1431. It is possible that the funds to build it were diverted from the treasure voyages.

=== Seventh voyage ===
We have traversed more than one hundred thousand li of immense water spaces, and have beheld in the ocean huge waves like mountains rising sky-high. We have set eyes on barbarian regions far away hidden in a blue transparency of light vapours, while our sails, loftily unfurled like clouds, day and night continued their course with starry speed, breasting the savage waves as if we were treading a public thoroughfare.

— Zheng He and his associates

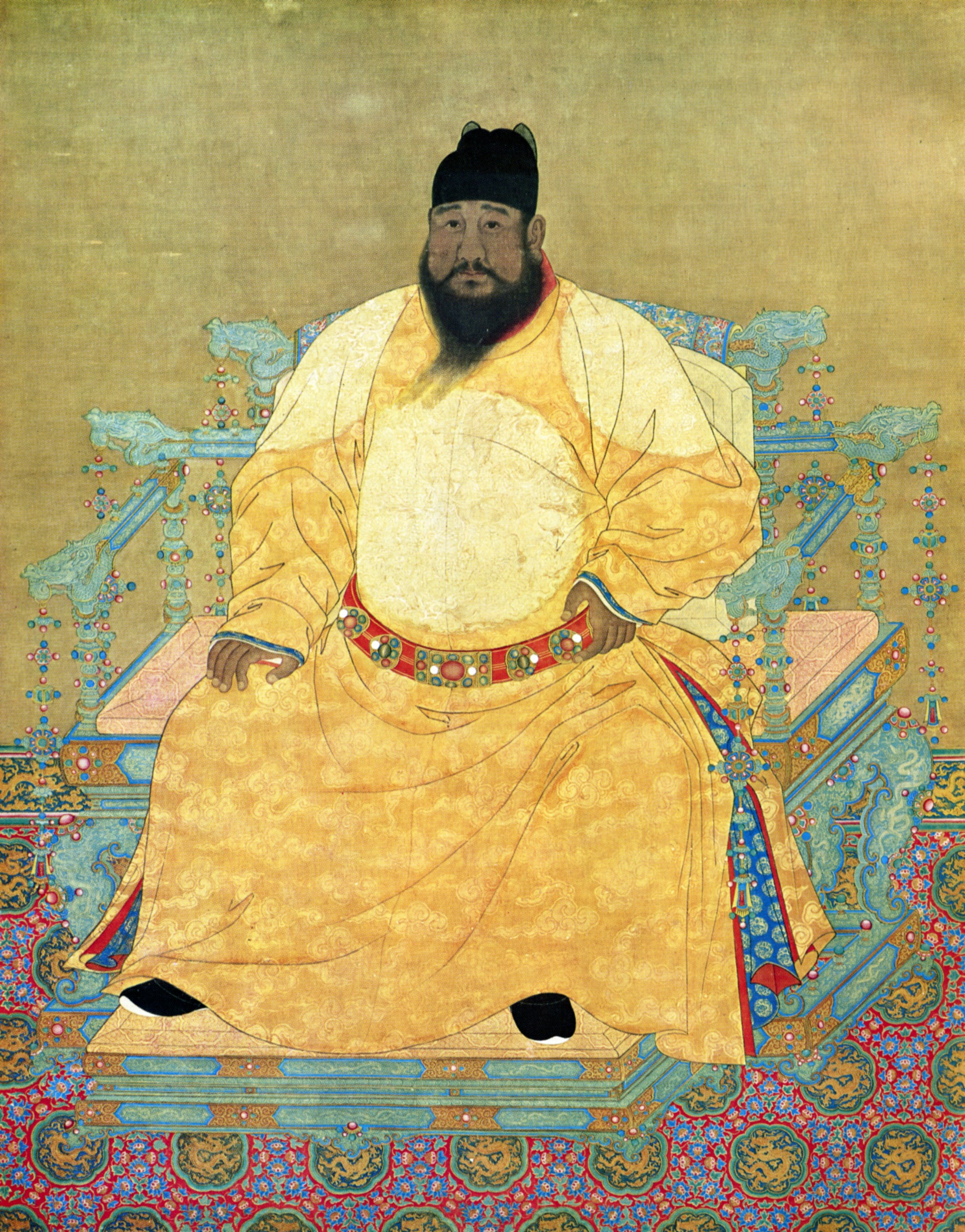
Painting of the Xuande Emperor, dated to the Ming dynasty (National Palace Museum)

Gong Zhen records that an imperial order was issued on 25 May 1430 for the arrangement of necessary provisions for the dispatch of Zheng He, Wang Jinghong, Li Xing, Zhu Liang, Yang Zhen, Hong Bao, and others on official business to the countries of the Western Ocean. It was addressed to Yang Qing (楊慶), Luo Zhi (羅智), Tang Guanbo (唐觀保), and Yuan Cheng (袁誠). On 29 June 1430, the Xuande Emperor issued his orders for the seventh voyage. It was addressed to Zheng and others. The Xuanzong Shilu reports that Zheng, Wang, and others were sent to distant foreign lands to bring them into deference and submission. The emperor wished to reinvigorate the tributary relations that were promoted during the Yongle reign.

Route of the seventh voyage

The Xia Xiyang provides information about the dates and itinerary for this voyage. (Note: See Dreyer (2007, 150–163) and Mills (1970, 14–18).) On 19 January 1431, the Chinese treasure fleet embarked from Longwan ('dragon bay') in Nanjing. On 23 January, they came to Xushan (an unidentified island in the Yangtze) where they went hunting. On 2 February, they passed through the Fuzi Passage (present-day Baimaosha Channel). They arrived at Liujiagang on 3 February. They arrived at Changle on 8 April. They went to Fu Tou Shan (possibly near Fuzhou) on 16 December. On 12 January 1432, they passed through the Wuhumen (in the entrance to the Min River). They arrived at Vijaya (near present-day Qui Nhon) in Champa on 27 January and departed from there on 12 February. They arrived at Surabaya in Java on 7 March and departed from there on 13 July. The fleet arrived at Palembang on 24 July and departed from there on 27 July. They arrived at Malacca on 3 August and departed from there on 2 September. They arrived at Semudera on 12 September and departed from there on 2 November. They arrived at Beruwala in Ceylon on 28 November and departed from there on 2 December. They arrived at Calicut on 10 December and departed from there on 14 December. They arrived at Hormuz on 17 January 1433 and departed from there on 9 March.

Hormuz was farthest west of the eight destinations recorded for the seventh voyage in the Xia Xiyang. The Mingshi and other sources describe the voyage with the fleet visiting at least seventeen countries (including those already mentioned in the Xia Xiyang). The additional destinations reported in the Mingshi are Ganbali, Bengal, Laccadive and Maldive island chains, Dhofar, Lasa, Aden, Mecca, Mogadishu, and Brava. Gong recorded a total of 20 visited countries. Fei Xin mentions that the fleet stopped at the Andaman and Nicobar island chains during the voyage. He writes that, on 14 November 1432, the fleet arrived at Cuilanxu (probably the Great Nicobar Island) where it anchored for three days due to the unfavorable winds and waves. He further writes that the native men and women came in log boats to trade coconuts. The neighboring Aru, Nagur, Lide, and Lambri were certainly visited by a few ships, according to Dreyer (2007), on the way to Semudera in northern Sumatra.

Zheng is mentioned in the Mingshi in connection to the visits of Ganbali, Lasa, Djorfar, Mogadishu, and Brava. Dreyer (2007) states that the account is unclear on whether he went to those places in person, but the wording could indicate that he did as it states that he proclaimed imperial instructions to the kings of these countries. He remarks that it is also possible that Zheng did not, because the fleet only made short stops at Calicut (4 days outward and 9 days homeward), which would not have provided enough time to travel overland to Ganbali, unless the location did not refer to Coimbatore but elsewhere in southern India. The overland journey may have been undertaken by someone other than Zheng.

Hong commanded a squadron for the journey to Bengal. Ma Huan was among the personnel in this squadron. It is not known when they exactly detached from the fleet for Bengal. (Note: Pelliot (1933, cited in Mills 1970, 19) argues that Hong Bao's squadron did not travel with the main fleet to Java. Another authority (Cited in Dreyer 2007, 156–157) argues for a detachment after Vijaya. Although, Dreyer (2007, 157) argues that there is no reason to believe a detachment had happened before Semudera.) They sailed directly from Semudera to Bengal. In Bengal, they traveled in order to Chittagong, Sonargaon, and the capital Gaur. Afterwards, they sailed directly from Bengal to Calicut. The fleet had departed from Calicut for Hormuz by the time Hong's squadron arrived in Calicut. Ma writes that Hong sent seven men to accompany a ship (Note: Ma Huan's account is ambiguous on whether the Chinese traveled on a foreign ship or on their own Chinese ships in company of a foreign ship to Mecca. The Chinese likely traveled with their own ships: (1) the Arabic texts Kitab as-Suluk li-ma rifat duwal al-muluk by al-Maqrizi and the Inba' al Gumr bi nba' al-umr by al-Asqallani use terminology specific to Chinese ships, (2) a letter by a captain to the authorities in Jeddah and Mecca for permission to make port was received as Chinese, and (3) the massive Chinese treasure ships, not Indian or Arab ships, were able to transport large animals for a very long span of time. (Jost 2019, 86–88)) from Calicut bound for Mecca after he observed that Calicut was sending men there. He adds that it took a year for them to go and return and that they had purchased various commodities and valuables such as giraffes, lions, and ostriches. Hong's tomb, located in Nanjing, contains an inscription that substantiates the visit to Mecca by the squadron commanded by Hong. It is likely that Ma was one of the people who visited Mecca. (Note: The following facts attest to Ma Huan's visit to Mecca: (1) Ma wrote a very detailed record about Mecca in his Yingya Shenglan (Dreyer 2007, 158–159; Mills 1970, 36), (2) the imperial clerk Gu Po wrote in the book's afterword that Ma Huan and Guo Chongli had visited Mecca (Mills 1970, 35–36 & 41–42), (3) Ma wrote in the book's foreword that he spoke about personal observations that were reflected in the book (Mills 1970, 35 & 41), and (4) Ma desired to go there as he was a Muslim himself (Mills 1970, 36).) Dreyer (2007) suggests that Hong may also have been involved with other destinations such as Dhofar, Lasa, Aden, Mogadishu, and Brava.

Dreyer (2007) states that the following countries may also have been visited by a few of the ships when the fleet passed by them: Siam; the northern Sumatran states of Aru, Nagur, Lide, and Lambri (when sailing to Semudera); and Quilon and Cochin (when sailing to Calicut). Mills (1970) concludes that Zheng's associates and not Zheng himself had visited Siam, Aru, Nagur, Lide, Lambri, Nicobar Islands, Bengal, Quilon, Cochi, Coimbatore, Maldive Islands, Dhufar, Lasa, Aden, Mecca, Mogadishu, and Brava. Pelliot (1933) suggests that the squadrons detached from the fleet at Hormuz to travel to Aden, the East African ports, and perhaps Lasa.

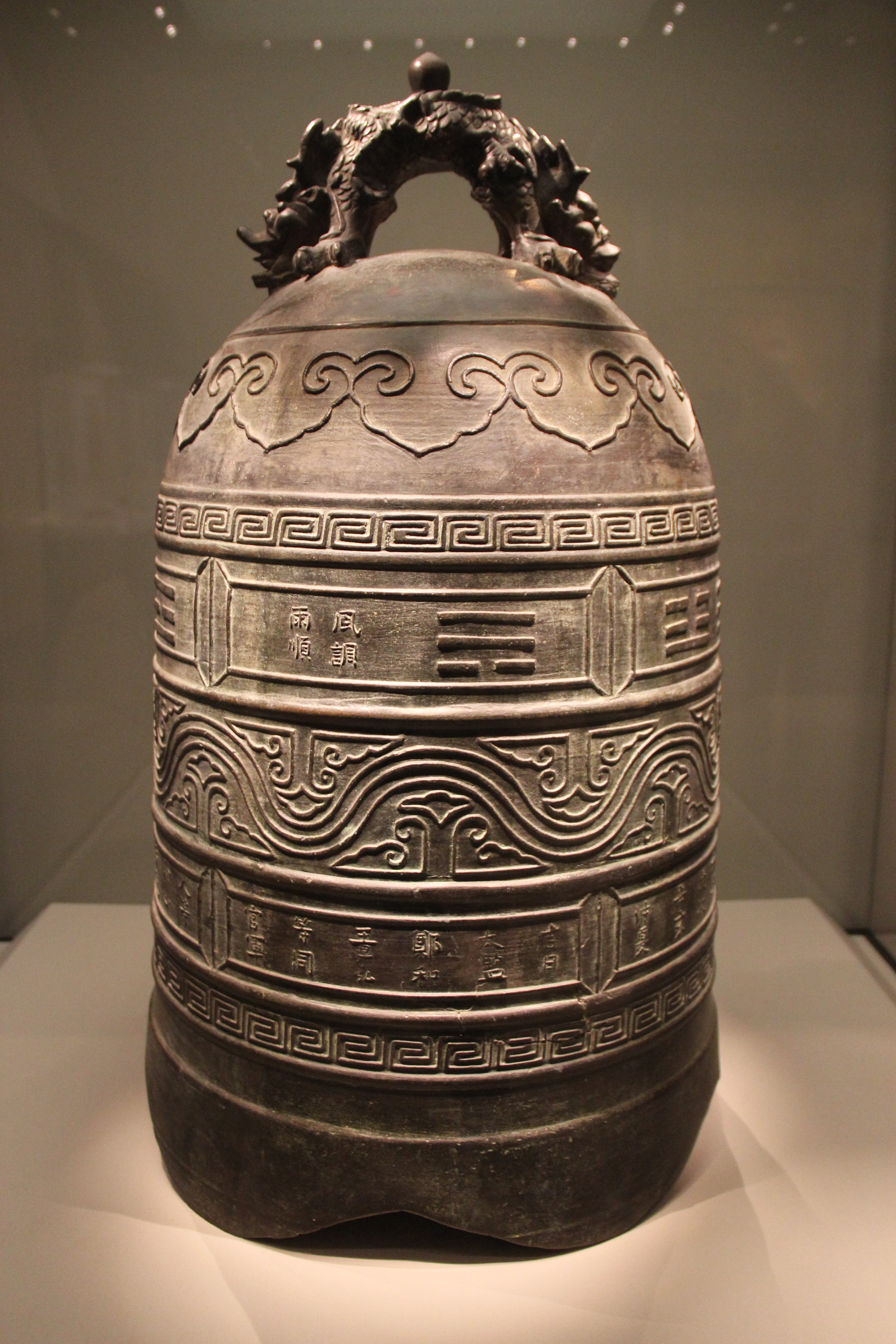
Zheng He, Wang Jinghong, and others had this bronze bell made for blessings in the seventh voyage (National Museum of China)

The Xia Xiyang also provided the dates and itinerary, as described hereafter, for the return route of the seventh voyage. The Chinese treasure fleet departed from Hormuz on 9 March 1433, arrived at Calicut on 31 March, and departed from Calicut on 9 April to sail across the ocean. They arrived at Semudera on 25 April and left there on 1 May. On 9 May, they arrived at Malacca. They arrived at the Kunlun Ocean (Note: The Kunlun Ocean is the waters around Poulo Condore and the Con Son Islands (Dreyer 2007, 160; Mills 1970, 17).) on 28 May. (Note: The Xia Xiyang records: "fifth month, tenth day [28 May 1433]: returning, [the fleet] arrived at the Kunlun Ocean." Dreyer (2007) deems it more likely that the date of 28 May refers to the departure from Malacca. He suggests the possibility that the arrival date at the Kunlun Ocean could have been dropped out in the text, as the word "returning" possibly indicated a departure from a location (similar to the account for Hormuz). He adds that, if the text is accepted as it is, the fleet would have departed from Malacca within a few days and would have traveled at a very slow pace of 16 days along the Champa coast. (Dreyer 2007, 160–161)) They arrived at Vijaya (present-day Qiu Nhon) on 13 June and left there on 17 June. The Xia Xiyang records several geographical sightings (Note: The Xia Xiyang records Culao Re's mountains on 19 June, Nan'ao Island's mountains on 25 June, Dongding Island's (Chapel Island) mountains in the evening of 26 June, Qitou Yang (Fodu Channel) on 30 June, Wan Tieh [possibly Damao Island's mountains] on 1 July, and the mountains of Daji Island (Gutzlaff Island) and Xiaoji Island (Hen and Chicks) on 6 July (Mills 1970, 17–18).) at this point. The fleet arrived at Taicang on 7 July. The Xia Xiyang notes that it did not record the later stages, that is, the journey between Taicang and the capital. On 22 July 1433, they arrived in the capital Beijing. On 27 July, the Xuande Emperor bestowed ceremonial robes and paper money to the fleet's personnel.

According to Dreyer (2007), the fleet's detached squadrons were probably already assembled at Calicut for the homeward journey, as the main fleet did not remain long there. He states that they did not stop at Ceylon or southern India, because they were sailing under favorable conditions and were running before the southwest monsoon. Ma records that the various detached ships reassembled in Malacca to wait for favorable winds before continuing their return.

The fleet returned with envoys from 11 countries, including from Mecca. On 14 September 1433, as recorded in the Xuanzong Shilu, the following envoys came to court to present tribute: King Zain al-Abidin of Semudera sent his younger brother Halizhi Han and others, King Bilima of Calicut sent his ambassador Gebumanduluya and others, King Keyili of Cochin sent his ambassador Jiabubilima and others, King Parakramabahu VI of Ceylon sent his ambassador Mennidenai and others, King Ali of Dhofar sent his ambassador Hajji Hussein and others, King Al-Malik az-Zahir Yahya b. Isma'il of Aden sent his ambassador Puba and others, King Devaraja of Coimbatore sent his ambassador Duansilijian and others, King Sa'if-ud-Din of Hormuz sent the foreigner Malazu, the King of "Old Kayal" (Jiayile) sent his ambassador Abd-ur-Rahman and others, and the King of Mecca sent the headman (toumu) Shaxian and others.

== Aftermath ==
=== Situation near the end ===
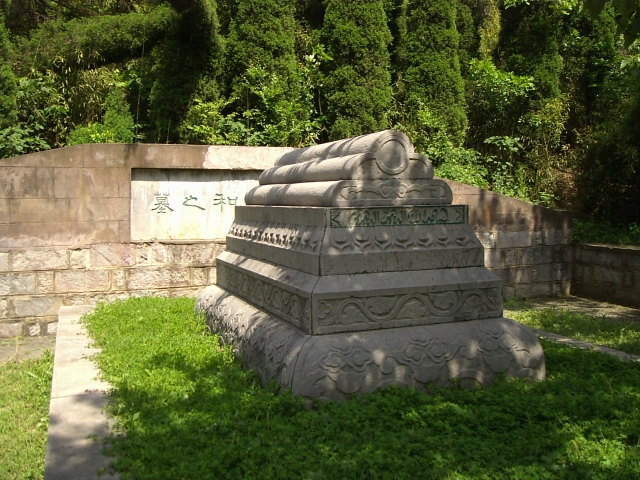
Zheng He's empty tomb in Nanjing

During the course of the treasure voyages, Ming China had become the pre-eminent naval power of the early 15th century. The Yongle Emperor had extended imperial control over foreign lands during the span of the voyages. However, in 1433, the voyages ceased and Ming China turned away from the seas. Admiral Zheng He himself died in 1433 or 1435.

The trade still flourished long after the voyages had ceased. Chinese ships continued to control the Eastern Asian maritime trade. They also kept on trading with India and East Africa. However, the imperial tributary system over the foreign regions and state monopoly over the foreign trade gradually eroded, while private trade supplanted the centralized tributary trade. The voyages were a means to establish direct links between the Ming court and foreign tribute states, which effectively bypassed both private trade channels and local civil officials who often undermined the prohibitions on overseas exchange. The end of the voyages led to the shift of foreign commerce to the domain of local authorities, which further weakened the authority of the central government.

The nobility and military were an important part of the ruling elite during the Hongwu and Yongle reigns, but the political power had gradually shifted to the civil government. As a consequence, the eunuch faction was unable to gather enough support to initiate projects opposed by civil officials. These bureaucrats remained wary of any attempt by the eunuchs to restart the voyages. The withdrawal of Ming China's treasure fleet left a power vacuum across the Indian Ocean.

=== Causes of cessation ===
It is not exactly known why the Ming treasure voyages completely ended in 1433. Duyvendak (1939) suggests that the heavy costs partly contributed to the ending of the expeditions, but Ray (1987), Finlay (1992), and Dreyer (2007) note that the costs had not overburdened the Ming treasury. Ray (1987) adds that the voyages were a profitable enterprise and rejects the notion that the voyages were terminated because they were wasteful, costly, or uneconomic. Siu (2023) remarks that pressure on the government and the economy by increasing expenditure should not be attributed to the voyages, since the voyages created positive revenue for the state.

Even though civil officials had ill feelings toward eunuchs for their overbearing nature and interference in state affairs, much of the hostility that came to characterize the relationship between the officials and eunuchs manifested long after the voyages ended, when eunuchs wielded their power to enrich themselves through extortion and to persecute their critics. According to Lo (1958) and Ray (1987), the hostility between these factions cannot explain the cessation of the voyages. Lo (1958) also notes that Zheng He was on friendly terms with many high officials and was respected by them, while Ray (1987) mentions that eunuchs such as Zheng He and Hou Xian were held in high esteem by the court.

In the conventional narrative, Confucian conservatism was supposedly responsible for bringing about the termination of the voyages and the general distaste for them thereafter. Kutcher (2020) challenges this view, as he argues that late Ming and early Qing texts reveal that critique on the voyages had to do with the excesses of eunuch power due to the corruption of the boundaries between the inner and outer court, rather than a set of ideological objections. Herein, the voyages were regarded as a critical moment in the empowerment of eunuchs, who should not have been given duties outside the court. Finlay (2008) remarks that although Confucian officials played a role in the cessation of the voyages, they were probably more motivated by institutional self-interest than by ideological bias, because the voyages were controlled by their bureaucratic rivals, the eunuchs.

Ray (1987) states that the cessation of the voyages happened as traders and bureaucrats, for reasons of economic self-interest and through their connections in Beijing, gradually collapsed the framework supporting both the state-controlled maritime enterprise and the strict regulation of the private commerce with prohibitive policies. Similarly, Lo (1958) states that rich and influential individuals used their connections in Beijing to undermine efforts to restore the trade to official channels and possibly revive the voyages, because they wanted to safeguard their interests and were antagonistic to the government's monopoly of foreign trade.

Sui (2023) argues that the cessation of the voyages was a consequence of the fiscal competition between emperors and civil officials. The Yongle Emperor extracted funds from the national treasuries to finance his construction projects and military operations, which included the treasure voyages, while he monopolized on the trade income to ensure freedom to realize his ambitious plans. In doing so, the emperor enhanced his authority in fiscal matters and encroached on the fiscal power of the civil government. The civil officials were charged by the emperor to raise funds for the voyages, but they had no influence in the trade income as the emperor had designated the eunuchs to manage the trade and its revenues. Herein, the voyages became a focal point of criticism by officials. Even though the financial allocation for the voyages was a relatively small portion of the government's overall budget, the voyages signified a step toward a new division of fiscal authority between the emperor and the civil officials, one which excluded the officials from the budget process.

In 1435, when the Xuande Emperor died, the civil officials started to gain power as the new emperor, the Zhengtong Emperor, was only eight years old when he ascended the throne and could be influenced. They seized this opportunity to permanently dismantle the voyages through a number of measures. Firstly, the civil officials diminished the power of the imperial navy. Plans for further voyages were cancelled, relevant offices such as the Haichuan Shoubei (海船守備; 'commandant of seagoing vessels') were dissolved, seagoing vessels were demolished or modified to ships unsuitable for sea travel, sea routes for the tax grain transport to Beijing were halted, and mariners were transferred to river transport work. Secondly, the civil officials ensured that the court would not produce goods for export. They terminated the mass production of export products and the purchase of the materials needed for it. All the eunuchs and officials, who had been sent to supervise the manufacturing or to make purchases, were recalled. Thirdly, the civil officials discouraged overseas visits through the implementation of complex and stringent regulations. From 1435, the bureaucrats urged the foreign delegations to leave China. The court sent them to Malacca and asked them to change ships there, which was a departure from the usual arrangement of another voyage to send all the visiting delegations back to their countries. The offer of transport services for visiting missions was stopped from then on. The size of a delegation was restricted and the frequency of tributary visits from the same delegation was reduced. The Maritime Trade Supervisorate, which was the office responsible for the reception of overseas visitors, was reduced in size. Lastly, the civil officials took measures to confine the fiscal power of the eunuchs. They took over the imperial treasuries from the eunuchs, deprived direct access to governmental revenue from the eunuchs, and requested in the name of the emperor (Note: For instance, in 1436, civil officials requested that Wang Jinghong convey three million catties of pepper and sappanwood to Beijing and hand it over to the government. They drew up instructions in the name of the Zhengtong Emperor, who was nine years old. Officials could only legally access the inventories of overseas products, which were under the strict control of the eunuchs, with the emperor's permission. This was because, constitutionally, the emperor had absolute power in diplomatic affairs, which included goods imported by diplomatic missions. (Siu 2023, 5)) that the eunuchs hand over the inventories of overseas products to the government.

== Impact ==
=== Goals and consequences ===
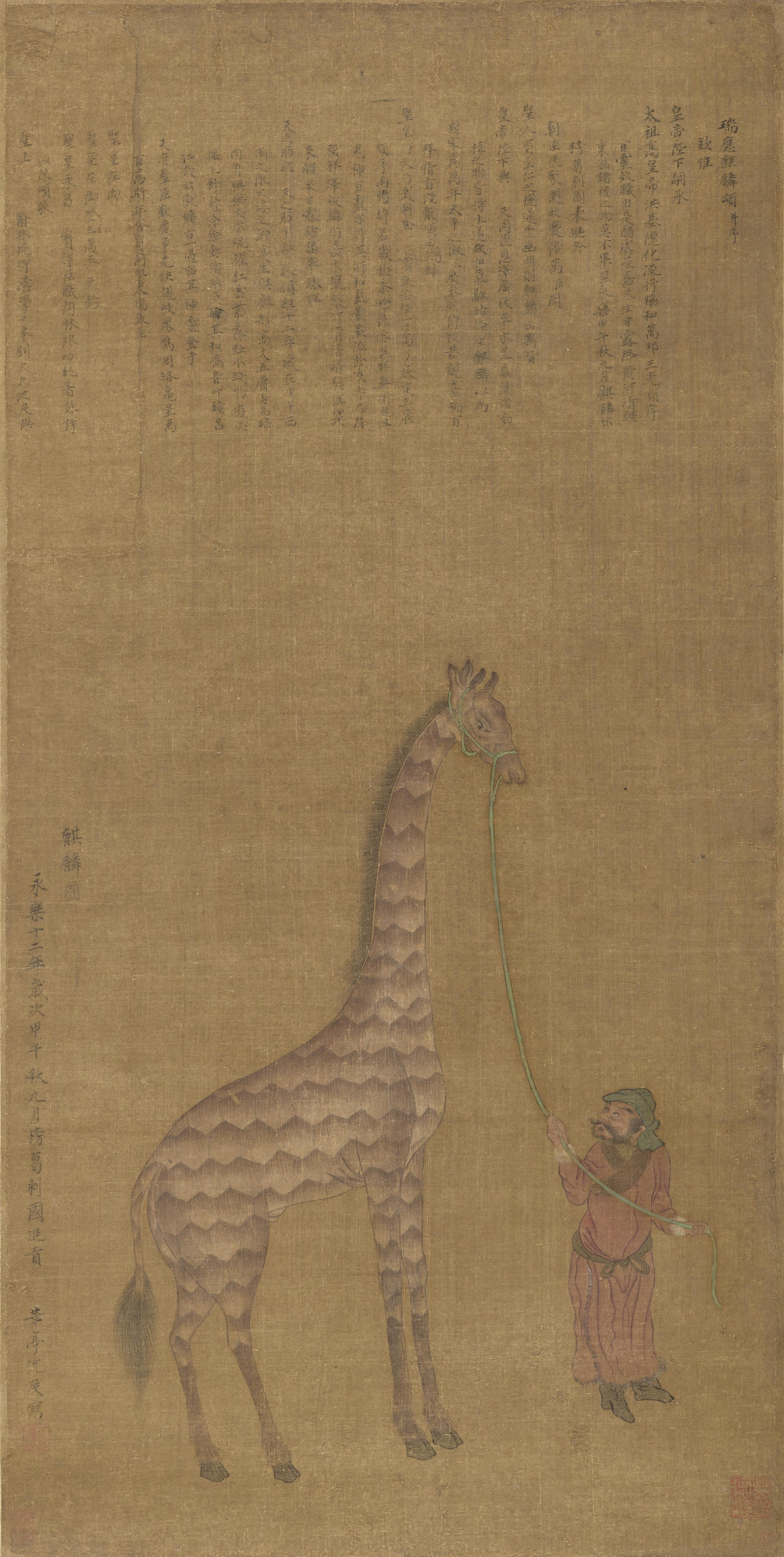
Tribute Giraffe with Attendant, depicting a giraffe presented by Bengal to the Ming court (Philadelphia Museum of Art)

The Ming treasure voyages were diplomatic, militaristic, and commercial in nature. They were conducted to establish imperial control over the maritime trade, to bring the maritime trade into the tributary system, and to compel foreign countries to comply with the tributary system. The diplomatic aspect comprised the announcement of the Yongle Emperor's accession to the throne, the establishment of hegemony over the foreign countries, and safe passage to foreign envoys who came bearing tribute. The emperor may have sought to legitimize his reign by compelling foreign countries to recognize their tributary status, as he came to rule the Chinese empire by usurping the Ming throne.

The Chinese did not seek territorial control, as they were primarily motivated by the political and economic control across space entailing domination over a vast network with its ports and shipping lanes. Finlay (2008) underscores the goal of controlling maritime commerce in which the voyages are regarded as an attempt to reconcile China's need for maritime commerce with the government's suppression of the private aspects of maritime commerce, representing "a deployment of state power to bring into line the reality of seaborne commerce with an expansive conception of Chinese hegemony." Neither the pursuit for exclusive access to nor the forceful integration of other countries' wealth was a feature of the expeditions. China's economy did not necessitate or was dependent on the systematic exploitation of foreign countries and their resources for its own capital accumulation. The trading centers along the maritime routes were kept open to other foreigners and remained unoccupied in a joint effort to further promote international trade.

The voyages changed the organization of the maritime network, utilizing and creating nodes and conduits in its wake, which restructured international and cross-cultural relationships and exchanges. It was especially impactful as no other polity had exerted naval dominance over all sectors of the Indian Ocean prior to these voyages. Chen (2019) states that the establishment of institutionalized tributary relations for mutual benefit, where foreign polities voluntarily cooperated in accordance to their own interests, was the fundamental way for the Chinese to attain their objectives. This institutionalization was marked by, for example, the establishment of official depots (官廠 guanchang) as overseas bases, which included local officials and merchants in its management and activities. Large-scale trade happened here between the Chinese and local polities including ordinary people, which helped the development of these polities into important hubs for maritime travel and trade. Ming China promoted alternative nodes as a strategy to establish control over the maritime network. For instance, Chinese involvement was a crucial factor for ports such as Malacca (in Southeast Asia), Cochin (on the Malabar Coast), and Malindi (on the Swahili Coast) to grow as key contenders to other important and established ports. (Note: Major ports in their respective regions included Palembang on the Malaccan Strait, Calicut on the Malabar coast, and Mombasa on the Swahili Coast (See Sen 2016).) The maritime network including its centers and institutions, promoted during the voyages, persisted and laid a foundation for later maritime travel and trade in the region. Through the voyages, Ming China intervened with the local affairs of foreign states and asserted itself in foreign lands. The Chinese installed or supported friendly local regimes, captured or executed rivals of local authorities, and threatened hostile local rulers into compliance. The appearance of the Chinese treasure fleet generated and intensified competition among contending polities and rivals, who sought an alliance with the Ming.

The tributary relations promoted during the voyages manifested a trend toward cross-regional interconnections and early globalization in Asia and Africa. The voyages brought about the Western Ocean's regional integration and the increase in international circulation of people, ideas, and goods. It provided a platform for cosmopolitan discourses, which took place in locations such as the ships of the Chinese treasure fleet, the Chinese capitals Nanjing and Beijing, and the banquet receptions organized by the Ming court for foreign representatives. People from different countries congregated, interacted, and traveled together as the fleet sailed from and to China. For the first time in its history, as Sen (2016) emphasizes, the maritime region from China to Africa was under the dominance of a single imperial power, which allowed for the creation of a cosmopolitan space.

Another purpose of the Chinese expeditions was the maintenance of political and ideological control across the region. In this regard, other countries needed to acknowledge that China was the hegemonic power in the region, not cause trouble with neighboring people, and accept the tributary system out of their own self-interest. Foreign rulers were compelled to acknowledge the inherent moral and cultural superiority of China, an obligation expressed by paying homage and presenting tribute before the Ming court. The Chinese intended to civilize the many foreign peoples by bringing them into formal submission within Ming China's greater world order. The cultural aspect of the voyages appears in the Liujiagang inscription, stating that "those among the foreigners who were resisting the transforming influence (genghua) of Chinese culture and were disrespectful, we captured alive, and brigands who indulged in violence and plunder, we ex-terminated. Consequently the sea-route was purified and tranquillised and the natives were enabled quietly to pursue their avocations."

Diplomatic relationships were based on a mutually beneficial maritime commerce and a visible presence of a Chinese militaristic naval force in foreign waters. Firstly, the Chinese naval superiority was a crucial factor in this interaction, namely because it was inadvisable to risk punitive action from the Chinese fleet. The fleet was, as Mills (1970) characterizes, "an instrument of aggression and political dominance." It brought forth the manifestation of China's power and wealth to awe foreign lands under Chinese hegemony. This was actualized by showing the Ming flag and establishing a military presence along the maritime trade routes. Secondly, the worthwhile and profitable nature of the Chinese maritime enterprise for foreign countries served as a persuading factor to comply. Even though the Chinese fleet demonstrated military might through their large warships and military forces, the Chinese often sent smaller squadrons comprising a few ships to foreign polities to pursue tributary relations through primarily trade opportunities instead.

A theory, considered very unlikely, suggests the voyages were initiated to search for the dethroned Jianwen Emperor. This search is mentioned as a reason for the voyages in a later work, the Mingshi. The stated intent of the Yongle Emperor to find the deposed Jianwen Emperor, according to Wang (1998), may have served no more than a public justification for the voyages in the face of prohibitive policies for military actions overseas from the Hongwu reign. Another unlikely theory is that the voyages were a response to the Timurid state under the reign of Tamerlane, another power across Asia and an enemy of Ming China. Ming China was left unchallenged by the Timurid after Tamerlane's death in 1405, because the new Timurid ruler Shahrukh (r. 1405–1447) normalized diplomatic relations with China and was preoccupied with holding his state together. Both theories are not accepted as they lack evidential support in contemporary historical sources.

=== Policy and administration ===
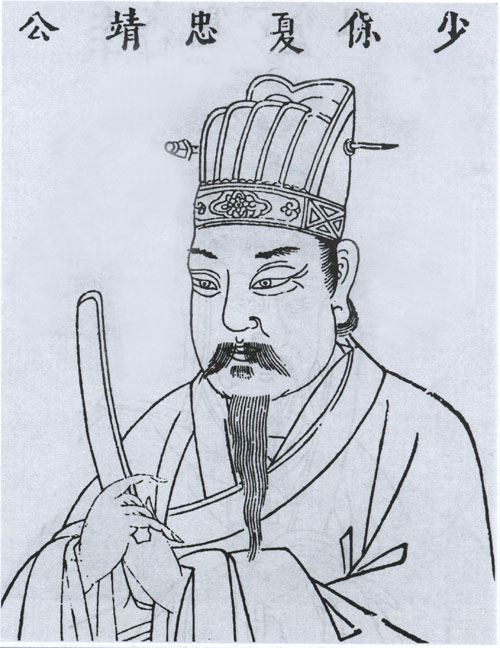
The civil official Xia Yuanji as depicted in the Sancai Tuhui, published in 1609

In the Ming court, the civil officials were the faction who opposed the treasure voyages. They condemned the expeditions as extravagant and wasteful, but the Yongle Emperor was unconcerned about the costs of the voyages and was determined to undertake them. In contrast, the eunuch establishment stood at the head of the treasure fleet and the expeditions. Traditionally, civil officials were the political opponents to the eunuch faction and to the military who crewed the fleet. This political and institutional disadvantage within the state system contributed to the inherent opposition of these bureaucrats against the voyages. Moreover, civil officials criticized the state expenses brought by the fleet's construction, but the emperor was set on realizing its formation. Construction projects were in fact usually the domain of the eunuchs. Eunuchs were assigned to supervise the fleet's construction, while the military was assigned to carry it out. On cultural grounds, the civil officials were hostile to the voyages, because the trade and acquisition of strange foreign goods conflicted with their Confucian ideologies. The undertaking of these expeditions only remained possible as long as the eunuchs maintained imperial favor.

The Hongwu Emperor initiated the haijin, a private maritime trade proscription, in 1371. He was wary of the political and social consequences that maritime commerce could bring, so he sought to restrain it by outlawing private maritime trade. This policy continued well into the Yongle reign. In addition, the Yongle Emperor aimed at consolidating imperial control over maritime commerce, stopping the coastal criminality and disorder, providing employment for mariners and entrepreneurs, exporting Chinese products to foreign markets, importing desired goods for Chinese consumers, extending the tributary system, and displaying imperial majesty to the seas. He limitedly reformed the tributary system and encouraged the opening up of state-run foreign trade, which resulted in the restoration of maritime supervisorates in Guangzhou, Quanzhou, and Ningbo, the expansion of tributary relations through measures such as tax exemptions for private trade activities by foreign envoys, and the treasure voyages led by Zheng He. The voyages functioned as trade commissions in the government's attempts to regulate maritime commerce by establishing an imperial monopoly over it and incorporating it into the tributary system. Dreyer (2007) states that there seems to have been an idea about a foreign policy comprising an extended foreign trade supported by a heavy military naval presence and a cultivation of shared interests with local allies.

The Yongle Emperor's interest in the voyages was the highest during the period spanning the first three voyages, but he became more occupied with his military campaigns against the Mongols after establishing the capital at Beijing. By the fourth voyage, he showed interest in the expansion of trade and diplomatic activity to West Asia. Therefore, the Chinese sought and employed Persian or Arabic language interpreters, such as Ma Huan (馬歡) and Guo Chongli (郭崇礼), to accompany the fleet. After the capital was transferred from Nanjing to Beijing, the south and the seas were given less and less attention from emperors and officials alike. The Hongxi Emperor wished to revert his father's relocation of the capital, but he died before he could do so. The Xuande Emperor, who succeeded him, remained in Beijing. Dreyer (2007) remarks that the prospects for the voyages would have been better if the capital was relocated back to Nanjing, because the court would have been near the locations where the voyages started and the Longjiang shipyards where most of the ships were built.

The Hongxi Emperor ordered the cessation of the voyages on 7 September 1424, the day of his accession to the throne. He was personally against the maritime entreprise. He had good relations with senior civil officials, as he had worked well with them when he served as regent while his father was away on his military campaigns against the Mongols or for the transformation of Beijing. He would often take the side of the officials when they mounted their opposition against his father's initiatives. In particular, Minister of Finance Xia Yuanji (夏原吉) was a vocal opponent against the voyages. In contrast, the Xuande Emperor went against the general court opinion when he ordered the seventh voyage. He relied on eunuchs during his reign.

=== Personnel and organization ===
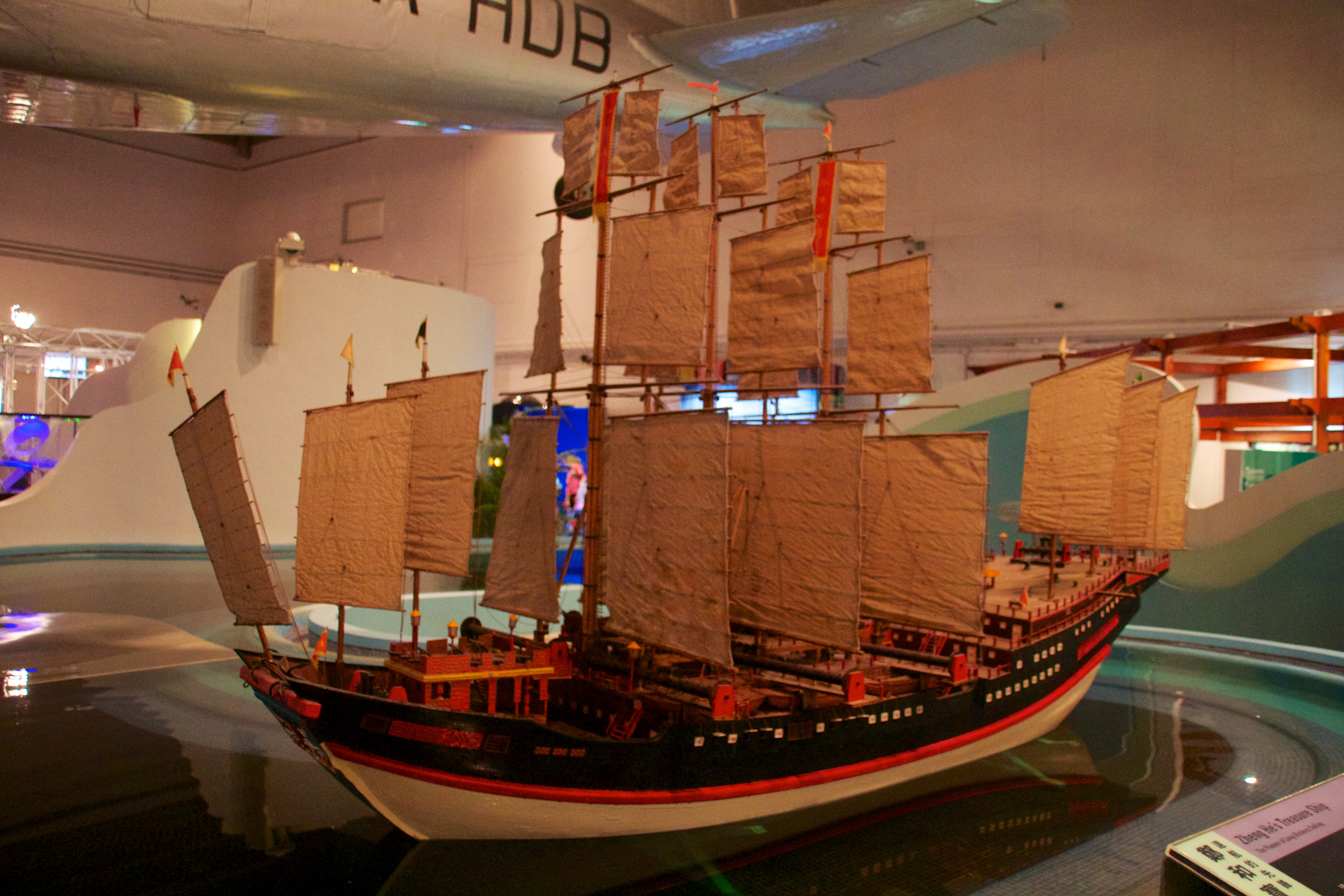
Model of a treasure ship (Hong Kong Science Museum)

The Chinese treasure fleet comprised an array of ships, each of which fulfilled specialized functions. The treasure ships were the largest vessels in the fleet and functioned, in the words of Finlay (2008), as "an emporium offering a wealth of products". They were each crewed by about 500 men according to Mills (1970) or at least 600 men according to Finlay (1992). Ma Huan mentions that their traders used small ships (小船 xiaochuan) to go ashore, presumably, according to Church (2005), while the larger ships remained anchored in the harbor. Gong Zhen mentions ships specifically designated to carry water.

There were seven Grand Directors (taijian) and ten Junior Directors (shaojian). The Grand Directors, such as Zheng He, served as ambassadors and commanders of the fleet, while the Junior Directors were their highest ranked assistants. In total, there were 70 eunuchs, including the aforementioned, at the head of the fleet. This was followed by two brigadiers (du zhihuishi), 93 captains (zhihuishi), 104 lieutenants (qianhu), and 103 sub-lieutenants (bohu). (Note: There are no exact translations for these military ranks. In this case, the article's text follows Mills (1970).) There were guard judges (wei zhenfu) and battalion judges (suo zhenfu), who adjudicated military offenses and were expected to replace lieutenants (qianhu) or sub-lieutenants (bohu) when necessary. Furthermore, there were 180 medical personnel, a bureau director from the Ministry of Finance, (Note: The bureau director from the Ministry of Finance was probably the principal purser for the fleet (Dreyer 2007, 128).) two secretaries, two protocol officers from the Court of State Ceremonial, (Note: The protocol officers from the Court of State Ceremonial were in charge of the reception of foreign envoys to the Chinese capital (Dreyer 2007, 128).) an astrological officer, and four astrologers. The remaining personnel, the rank and file, included petty officers (qixiao or quanxiao), brave corps (yongshi), power corps (lishi), (Note: The power corps likely operated heavy (war) equipment (Mills 1970, 32).) military soldiers (referred as guanjun, 'official soldiers', or qijun, 'flag soldiers'), supernumeraries (yuding), boatsman (minshao), buyers (maiban), and clerks (shushou). Religious leaders from different faiths such as Buddhism, Hinduism, and Islam also served in the fleet.

The Liujiagang inscription records Zheng He (鄭和) and Wang Jinghong (王景弘) as the principal envoys as well as Zhu Liang (朱良), Zhou Man (周滿), Hong Bao (洪保), Yang Zhen (楊真), and Zhang Da (張達) as deputy envoys. The Changle inscription repeats this, but adds Li Xing (李興) and Wu Zhong (吳忠) as deputy envoys. All envoys are recorded to have carried the rank of Grand Director in both inscriptions, except Zhang Da who was reported with the rank of Senior Assistant Director in the Liujiagang inscription and the rank of Grand Director in the Changle inscription. Additionally, the Changle inscription mentions Zhu Zhen (朱真) and Wang Heng (王衡) as the brigadiers. These people and unnamed "others" are mentioned on the respective inscriptions as those who have composed it. The Changle inscription also mentions that the Daoist priest Yang Yichu (楊一初) begged to erect its respective stele.

Zhu Yunming's Xia Xiyang records the following personnel: officers and petty officers (guanxiao), soldiers (qijun), mess leaders (huozhang), helmsman (tuogong), anchormen (bandingshou), interpreters (tongshi), business managers (banshi), accountants (susuanshi), doctors (yishi), anchor mechanics (tiemiao), caulkers (munian), sailmakers (dacai), sailors (shuishou), and boatmen (minshaoren).

For the first Ming treasure voyage, the fleet had a personnel of 27,800 or 27,870 men. The fleet comprised 317 ships, which included 62 treasure ships. However, 63 treasure ships is also a possibility.

The historical record gives the following figures: The Mingshi records 62 treasure ships and a crew of 27,800 for the first voyage. Tan Qian's Guoque records 63 treasure ships and a crew of 27,870 for the first voyage. The Zuiweilu records a personnel of 37,000, but this is probably a copyist error. The Taizong Shilu records two imperial orders for ship construction to Nanjing's capital guards: an order for 200 ships (海運船 haiyunchuan) on 4 September 1403 and an order for 50 ships (海船 haichuan) on 1 March 1404. The text did not record the purpose for the construction of these 250 ships. Yan Congjian's Shuyu Zhouzilu conflated this to one imperial order for the construction of 250 ships specifically for the voyages to the Western Ocean. The Taizong Shilu also records a 2 March 1404 imperial order for Fujian to construct 5 ships (haichuan) to be used in the voyages to the Western Ocean. Therefore, the scholarly figure of 317 ships for the first voyage is derived from the 255 ships and 62 treasure ships in the record. (Note: Dreyer (2007, 123) thinks that the fleet had a total of 255 ships, including the treasure ships, but he also mentions that the figure for 317 ships is credible and accepted in most accounts.)

For the second voyage, it is thought that the fleet comprised 249 ships. On 5 October 1407, as the Taizong Shilu records, Wang Hao was ordered to supervise the conversion of 249 ships in preparation for embassies to the countries at the Western Ocean. This was close to the date when the second voyage was ordered, thus the fleet likely comprised these 249 ships for the second voyage. The number of treasure ships or personnel is not known.

For the third voyage, Fei Xin's Xingcha Shenglan records that the fleet had 48 haibo (海舶) and a crew of over 27,000. Dreyer (2007) states that Fei was probably referring to the treasure ships as haibo. Yan's Shuyu Zhouzilu and Lu Rong's Shuyuan Zaji use the term "treasure ship" instead when they mention the 48 ships for this voyage. Coincidentally, the Taizong Shilu records the imperial order issued on 14 February 1408 for the construction of 48 treasure ships to the Ministry of Works at Nanjing; these were possibly the 48 treasure ships for the third voyage. Dreyer (2007) states that the fleet likely had an undisclosed array of support ships in addition to the 48 treasure ships.

Ma's Yingya Shenglan records 63 treasure ships for the fourth voyage. Dreyer (2007) says that these were probably accompanied by support ships. The fleet was crewed by 28,560 or 27,670 men. Fei records a personnel of 27,670 for this voyage, but another source records 28,560.

There is no record for the number of ships or personnel for the fifth voyage.

On 2 October 1419, an order was issued for the construction of 41 treasure ships from an undisclosed shipbuilder. Most scholars conclude that these were likely used for the sixth voyage, but many other treasure ships had already been constructed or were in construction by that time. There is no specific figure for the ships or personnel of the sixth voyage. The fleet probably made use of several dozen of the treasure ships each accompanied by half a dozen support vessels.

For the seventh voyage, the Liujiagang and Changle inscriptions speak of over a hundred large ships (巨舶 jubo). Dreyer (2007) suggests that these ships probably included most of the remaining treasure ships, which were likely accompanied by support ships. The Xia Xiyang records the names of several ships—Qinghe (清和; 'pure harmony'), Huikang (惠康; 'kind repose'), Changning (長寧; 'lasting tranquility'), Anji (安濟; 'peaceful crossing'), and Qingyuan (清遠; 'pure distance')—and notes that there were also ships designated by a series number. The fleet had 27,550 men as personnel for the voyage.

=== Military affairs ===
Before the Ming treasure voyages, there was turmoil around the seas near the Chinese coast and distant Southeast Asian maritime regions, characterized by piracy, banditry, slave trade, and other illicit activities. The Chinese treasure fleet had a large number of warships to protect their precious cargo and to secure the maritime routes. They established a substantial Chinese military presence around the South China Sea and trading cities in southern India. The early stages of the voyages were especially characterized by highly militaristic objectives, as the Chinese stabilized the sea passages from hostile entities as well as strengthened their own position and maintained their status in the region. Even though Zheng He sailed through the oceans with a military force larger and stronger than any local power, there is no written evidence in historical sources that there was any attempt that they forcibly tried to control the maritime trade in the regions of the South China Sea and Indian Ocean. Dreyer (2007) adds that the large Chinese fleet would still have been a "terrifying apparition" when it came within visible reach along the coastlines of foreign nations, bringing any state into submission by the sole sight of it alone. From the fourth voyage onwards, the fleet ventured further than their usual end-destination of Calicut to lands beyond where there would be less direct hostilities.

The fleet engaged and defeated Chen Zuyi's pirate fleet in Palembang, Alakeshvara's forces in Ceylon, and Sekandar's forces in Semudera, bringing security and stability of the maritime routes via Chinese control. These actors were viewed as hostile threats in their regions and the battles served as a reminder of the tremendous power of Ming China to the countries along the maritime routes. The Strait of Malacca, specifically, constituted a strategically important link into the Indian Ocean, so control over this region was essential for the Chinese to establish themselves as the supreme power in maritime Asia and to develop trade relations with polities throughout the Indian Ocean. Here, the fleet fought battles against pirates at Palembang, Aru (in northern Semudera), and Kapas (near present-day Klang) to consolidate the region.

In Malacca, the Chinese actively sought to develop a commercial hub and a base of operation for the voyages into the Indian Ocean. Malacca had been a relatively insignificant region, not even qualifying as a polity prior to the voyages according to both Ma Huan and Fei Xin, and was a vassal region of Siam. In 1405, the Ming court dispatched Zheng with a stone tablet enfeoffing the Western Mountain of Malacca and an imperial order elevating the status of the port to a country. The Chinese also established a government depot (官廠) as a fortified cantonment for their soldiers. It served as a storage facility as the fleet traveled and assembled from other destinations within the maritime region. Ma reports that Siam did not dare to invade Malacca thereafter. The rulers of Malacca, such as King Paramesvara in 1411, would pay tribute to the Chinese emperor in person. In 1431, when a Malaccan representative complained that Siam was obstructing tribute missions to the Ming court, the Xuande Emperor dispatched Zheng carrying a threatening message for the Siamese king saying "You, king should respect my orders, develop good relations with your neighbours, examine and instruct your subordinates and not act recklessly or aggressively."

On the Malabar coast, Calicut and Cochin were in an intense rivalry, so the Ming decided to intervene by granting special status to Cochin and its ruler Keyili (可亦里). For the fifth voyage, Zheng was instructed to confer a seal upon Keyili of Cochin and enfeoff a mountain in his kingdom as the Zhenguo Zhi Shan (鎮國之山; 'Mountain Which Protects the Country'). He delivered a stone tablet, inscribed with a proclamation composed by the Yongle Emperor, to Cochin. As long as Cochin remained under the protection of Ming China, the Zamorin of Calicut could not invade Cochin and a military conflict was averted. Consequently, the cessation of the voyages was followed by the invasion of Cochin by the Zamorin of Calicut.

=== Diplomacy and commerce ===
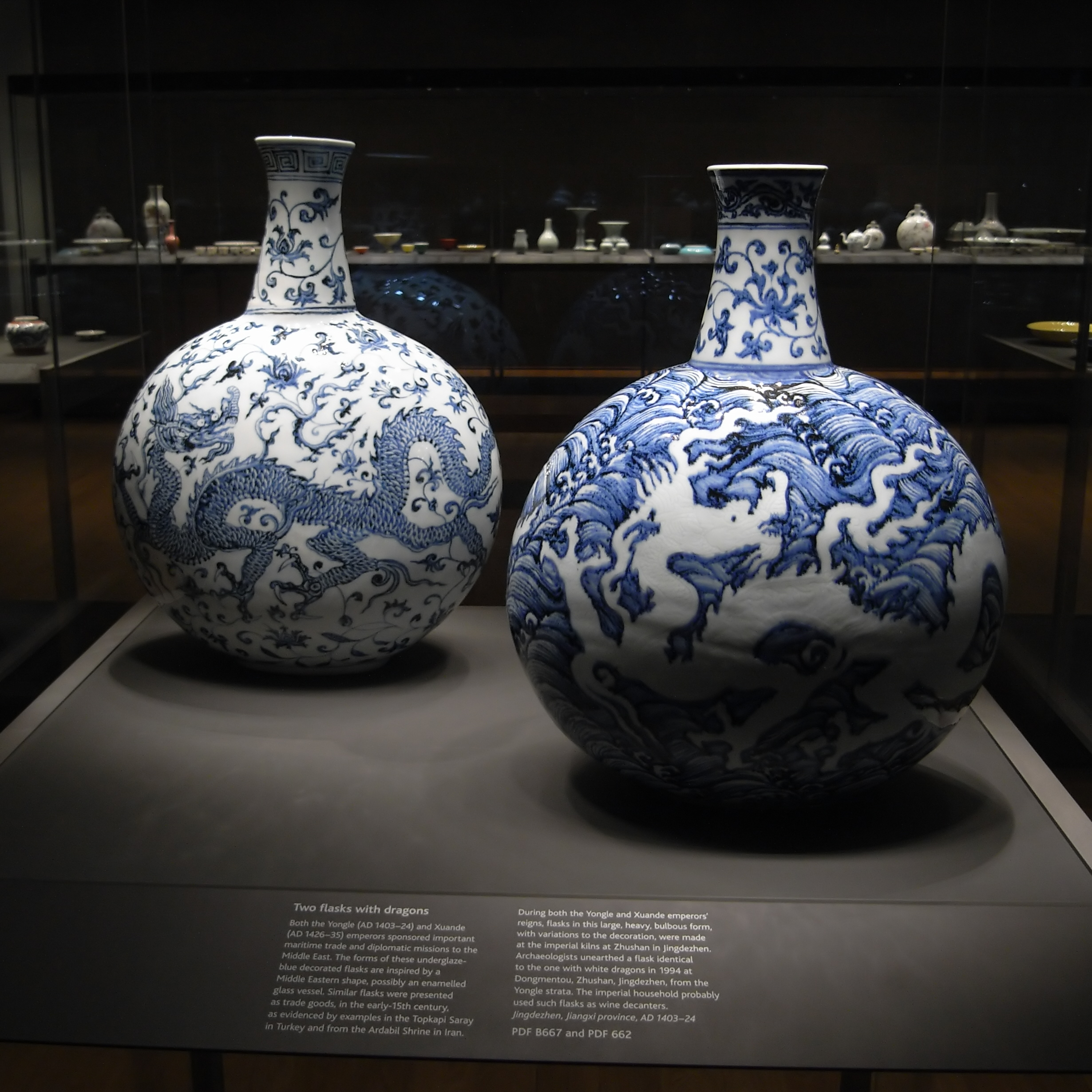
Porcelain wares, similar to these Yongle-era porcelain flasks, were often presented as trade goods during the expeditions (British Museum)

The commodities that the Chinese treasure fleet carried included three major categories: gifts to be bestowed on rulers, items for exchange of goods or payment of goods with fixed prices at low rates (e.g., gold, silver, copper coins, and paper money), and items which China held a monopoly over (e.g., musks, ceramics, and silks). It was said that there were sometimes so many Chinese goods unloaded into an Indian port that it could take months to price everything. In turn, Zheng He returned to China with many kinds of tribute goods, such as silver, spices, sandalwood, precious stones, ivory, ebony, camphor, tin, deer hides, coral, kingfisher feathers, tortoise shells, gums and resin, rhinoceros horn, sapanwood and safflower (for dyes and drugs), Indian cotton cloth, and ambergris (for perfume). The ships even brought back exotic animals, such as ostriches, elephants, and giraffes. The imports from the Ming treasure voyages provided large quantities of economic goods that fueled China's own industries. For example, there was so much cobalt oxide from Persia that the porcelain industry at Jingdezhen had a plentiful supply for decades after the voyages. The fleet also returned with such a large amount of black pepper that the once-costly luxury became a common commodity in Chinese society. Meanwhile, large-scale exports during the voyages prompted the development of Chinese industries and opened up their overseas markets.

The voyages resulted in a flourishing Ming economy and stimulated the lucrative maritime commerce. The expeditions developed into a maritime trade enterprise where the Chinese began trading and supplying the commodities that were non-Chinese in origin. This highlighted the commercial character of the voyages in which the Chinese expanded upon the already large profits from their trade. The impact of the expeditions on commerce was on multiple levels: it established imperial control over local private commercial networks, expanded tributary relations and thereby brought commerce under state supervision, established court-supervised transactions at foreign ports and thereby generate substantial revenue for both parties, and increased production and circulation of commodities across the region. The voyages induced a sudden supply shock in the Eurasian market, where the Chinese maritime exploits in Asia led to disruptions of imports to Europe with sudden price spikes in the early 15th century.

Imperial proclamations were issued to foreign kings, meaning that they could either submit and be bestowed with rewards or refuse and be pacified under the threat of an overwhelming military force. Foreign kings had to reaffirm their recognition of the Chinese emperor's superior status by presenting tribute. Those rulers who submitted received political protection and material rewards. Many countries were enrolled as tributaries. The fleet conducted the transport of the many foreign envoys to China and back, but some envoys traveled independently.

=== Geography and society ===
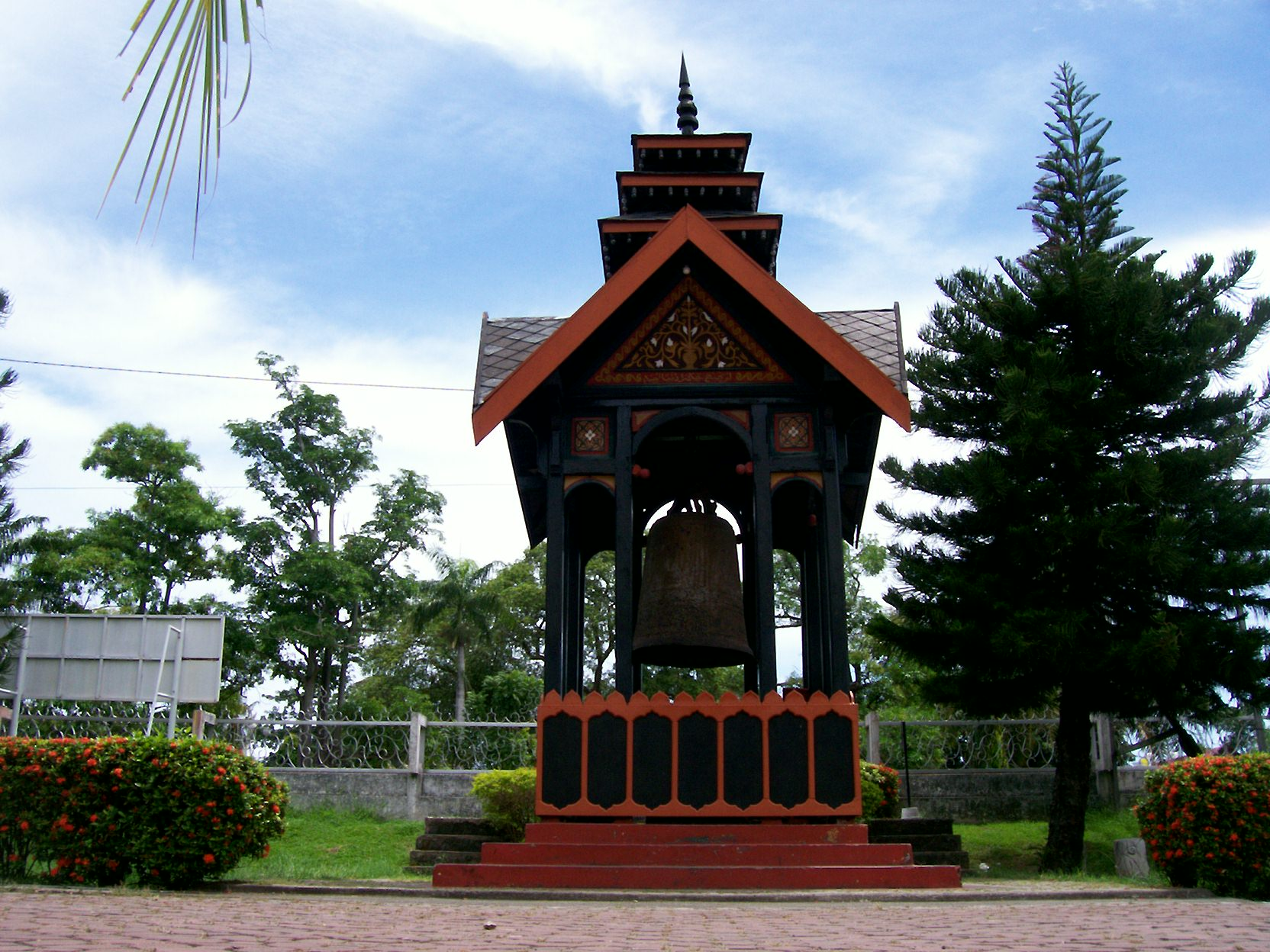
Cakra Donya bell, a gift from Zheng He to Semudera (Aceh Museum)

The Chinese treasure fleet sailed the equatorial and subtropical waters of the South China Sea and Indian Ocean, where they were dependent on the circumstances of the annual cycle of monsoon winds. Therefore, the fleet's navigators precisely organized the treasure voyages under careful considerations of the periodical patterns of the tropical and subtropical monsoon. For the southward route from Changle in China to Surabaya in Java, the fleet followed the northeast wind, crossed the Equator (where the northeast wind changes into the northwest wind due to the Coriolis force), and then followed the northwest wind. At Java, the fleet waited for the arrival of the tropical southeast wind in the Southern Hemisphere and used it to sail toward Sumatra. At Sumatra, the fleet was halted due to the change of the southeast wind into a strong southwest wind at a northern latitude close to the equator and waited until next winter for the northeast wind. For the northwestward route toward Calicut and Hormuz, the Chinese took advantage of the northeastern wind. The return journey was set during the late summer and early autumn because favorable monsoon winds were present at that time. The fleet left Hormuz before the southwestern monsoon arrived over the Indian Ocean. They made use of the northern wind for the southward journey from Hormuz to Calicut. For the eastward journey from Sumatra, the fleet used the newly arrived southwestern monsoon over the eastern parts of the Indian Ocean. After the fleet passed through the Strait of Malacca, the fleet caught up with the southwest wind over the South China Sea to sail back to China. As maritime conditions were limited by the monsoon winds, squadrons were detached from the main fleet to diverge to specific destinations. The first point of divergence was Sumatra, from where a squadron would travel to Bengal. The second point of divergence was Calicut, from where ships sailed to Hormuz as well as other destinations at the Arabian Peninsula and East Africa. Malacca was the rendezvous point where the squadrons would reassemble for the final leg of the return journey.

During all the voyages, the fleet departed from Sumatra to sail westward across the Indian Ocean. Northern Sumatra was an important region for the fleet's anchorage and assembly before they proceeded through the Indian Ocean to Ceylon and southern India. Its location was more important than its wealth or products to the fleet. Ma Huan wrote that Semudera, located in northern Sumatra, was the main route to the Western Ocean and characterized it as the most important port of assembly for the Western Ocean. The journey from Sumatra to Ceylon took about two to four weeks without seeing land. The first part of Ceylon that became visible after departure from Sumatra was Namanakuli (or Parrot's Beak Mountain), the easternmost mountain (6680 ft in elevation and 45 miles away from the coast). Two or three days after its sighting, the fleet adjusted their course to sail south of Dondra Head at Ceylon. After a considerable long time at sea since leaving Sumatra, the fleet arrived at a port in Ceylon, usually at Beruwala and sometimes at Galle. The Chinese preferred Beruwala over Galle, but they have made port at both locations. Ma characterized Beruwala as "the wharf of the country of Ceylon."

Calicut was a main destination throughout the voyages and also served as a place of transit to destinations further west during the later voyages. Ming China had cordial relations with Calicut, which was valuable as they tried to extend the tributary system to the states around the Indian Ocean. Ma described Calicut as the "great country of the Western Ocean" and had a positive response to the Calicut authorities' regulation of trade and attention to weights and measurements. Fei Xin described Calicut as the "great harbor" of the Western Ocean countries.

=== Navigation ===
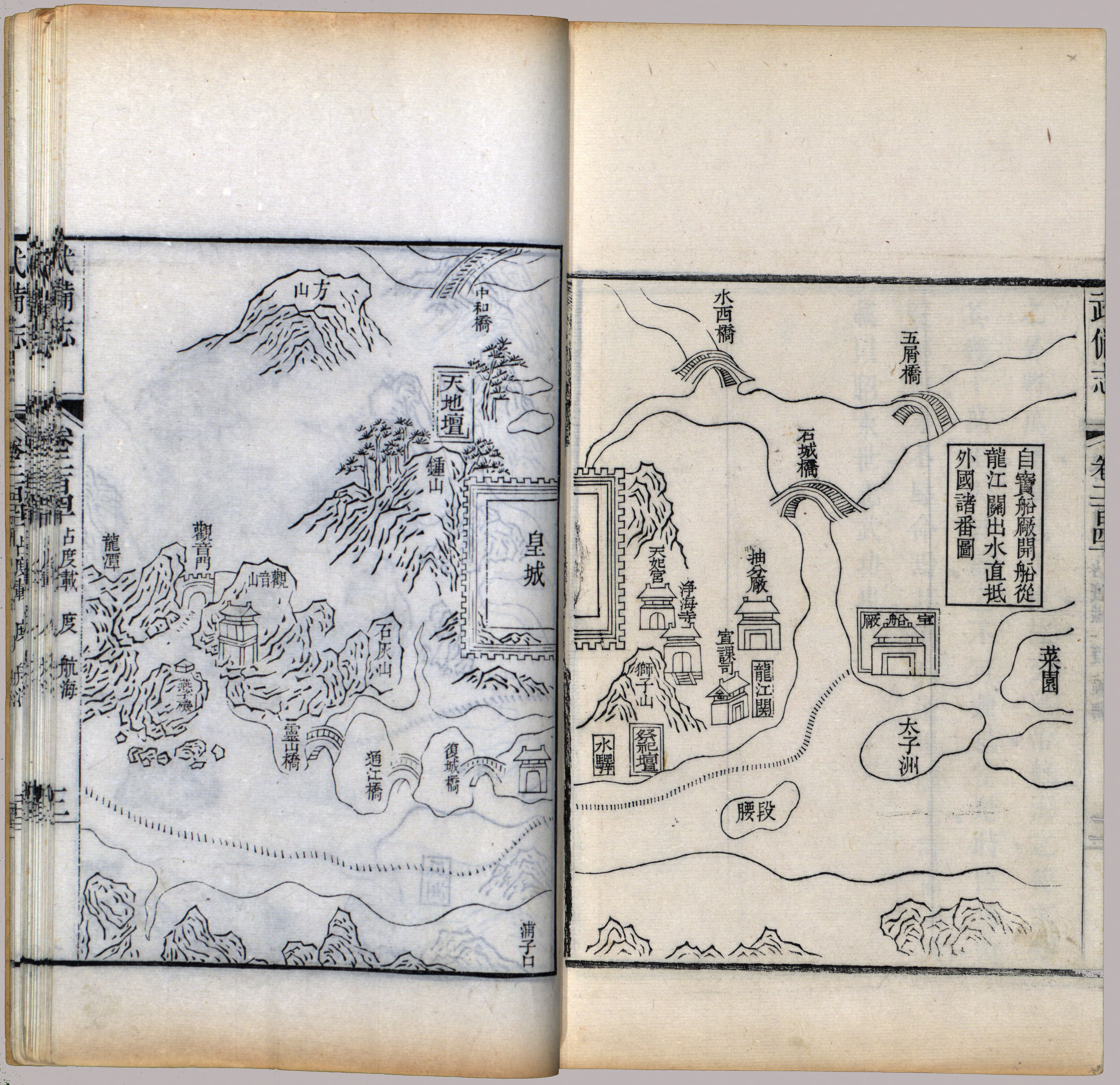
Section of the Mao Kun map as collected in the Wubei Zhi (Library of Congress)

During the Ming treasure voyages, the Chinese treasure fleet acquired and collected a large amount of navigational data. These were specifically recorded by the astrological officer and his four astrologers. The navigational data were processed into different types of charts by a cartographic office, comprising an astrological officer, four astrologers, and their clerks. It provided the expeditionary commanders with the necessary navigational charts for their voyages. Many copies of the expeditionary charts were housed in the Ministry of War. Additional navigational data were probably also supplied by local maritime pilots, Arab records, Indian records, and other Chinese records.

The fleet's navigators and pilots were known as huozhang (火長) or, in the case they were foreigners, as fanhuozhang (番火長). They used instruments such as compasses. The fanhuozhang and the huozhang as well as others were recorded in the Ming Shilu, in connection to awards given to the crew for participation in the battles at Palembang and Ceylon as well as a hostile encounter between returning ships led by the eunuch Zhang Qian (張謙) and Japanese pirates, who were inflicted a heavy defeat, near Jinxiang in Zhejiang.

The Mao Kun map depicts the routes taken by the fleet during the voyages. It is collected in the Wubei Zhi, compiled by Mao Yuanyi. It portrays various geographic locations from Nanjing to Hormuz as well as the East African coast, with routes illustrated by dotted lines. Mills (1954) dates the map to about 1422, as he concludes that it compiles the navigational data from the expedition that took place between 1421 and 1422. The directions are expressed by compass points and distances in watches, with references to navigational techniques (such as depth sounding to avoid shallow waters) and astronomy (particularly along the north–south route of Africa where the latitude is determined by the height of constellations relative to the horizon). The Mao Kun map is appended by four stellar diagrams that were used to determine the position of the ship in relation to the stars and constellations on specific sections of the maritime route.

=== Faith and ceremony ===
The power of the goddess, having indeed been manifested in previous times, has been abundantly revealed in the present generation. In the midst of the rushing waters it happened that, when there was a hurricane, suddenly a divine lantern was seen shining at the masthead, and as soon as that miraculous light appeared the danger was appeased, so that even in the peril of capsizing one felt reassured and that there was no cause for fear.

— Zheng He and his associates about witnessing Tianfei's divine lantern, which represented the natural phenomena Saint Elmo's fire

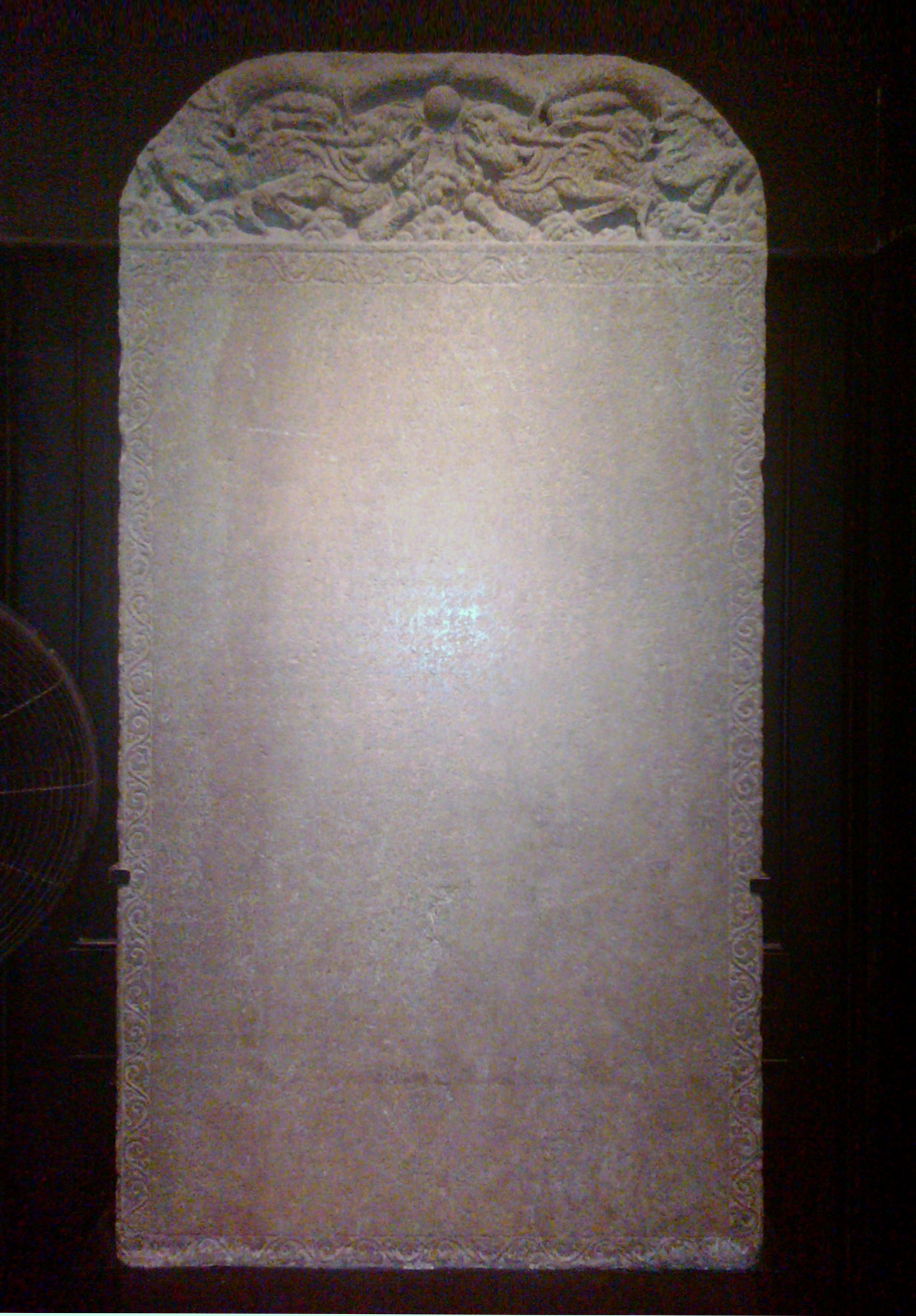
The Galle Trilingual Inscription features praise and offerings dedicated by the Chinese toward the three dominant religions in Ceylon (Colombo National Museum)

The faith of the Chinese treasure fleet's crew was centered around Tianfei, the "Heavenly Princess" who was the goddess of sailors and seafarers. The Liujiagang and Changle inscriptions honored and commemorated this goddess. They make reference to the crew witnessing Saint Elmo's fire during dangerous storms and interpreting it as a sign of divine protection by Tianfei. Zheng He and his associates established the inscriptions at the temples of Tianfei at Liujiagang on 14 March 1431 and Changle between 5 December 1431 and 3 January 1432. The inscriptions suggest that Zheng's life was mostly defined by the treasure voyages and that his devotion to Tianfei was the dominant strand in his faith. They are considered the epitaphs of the voyages.

In Galle, Ceylon, Zheng set up a trilingual inscription dated 15 February 1409. (Note: The date of 15 February 1409 possibly refers to when the trilingual inscription was erected in Galle, indicating that it was put up during the homeward journey of the second voyage (Dreyer 2007, 66). If not, the inscription could have been prepared in China and erected between 1410 when the fleet arrived at Galle to 1411 during the third voyage (Dreyer 2007, 72). Duyvendak (1939, 369) states that the inscription must have been prepared in China on 15 February 1409 and erected during the third expedition (1409–1411), because he thinks that the 15 February 1409 date is connected to the dates for the conference of honors to two deities, Tianfei (天妃) on 21 January 1409 and Nanhaishen (南海神) on 15 February 1409.) The inscription is in three languages, in which the Chinese section praised the Buddha, the Tamil section praised the local god Tenavarai Nayanar (an incarnation of Vishnu), and the Persian section praised Allah. Each section contains a similar list of offerings, such as 1,000 pieces of gold, 5,000 pieces of silver, 100 rolls of silk, 2,500 catties of perfumed oil, and a variety of bronze ornaments. As shown by this inscription, the Chinese paid their respect to the three dominant religions in Ceylon.

On 20 September 1414, Bengali envoys presented a giraffe as tribute in the name of King Saif Al-Din Hamzah Shah of Bengal (r. 1410–1412) to the Yongle Emperor of Ming China. The giraffe was identified as the qilin, but the emperor did not want his officials to send laudatory memorials on behalf of its auspicious appearance during his reign and, as suggested by Church (2004), probably did not think it was a qilin.

Confucianism influenced how the Chinese interacted with the world during the voyages. Chang (2021) posits that the Chinese did not aim to convert others to Confucianism, which was different from the Europeans who sought to spread Christianity, due to its monistic, polytheistic, sanguine, and circular outlooks of the world that led to a more restrained or detached approach.

=== Historiography ===
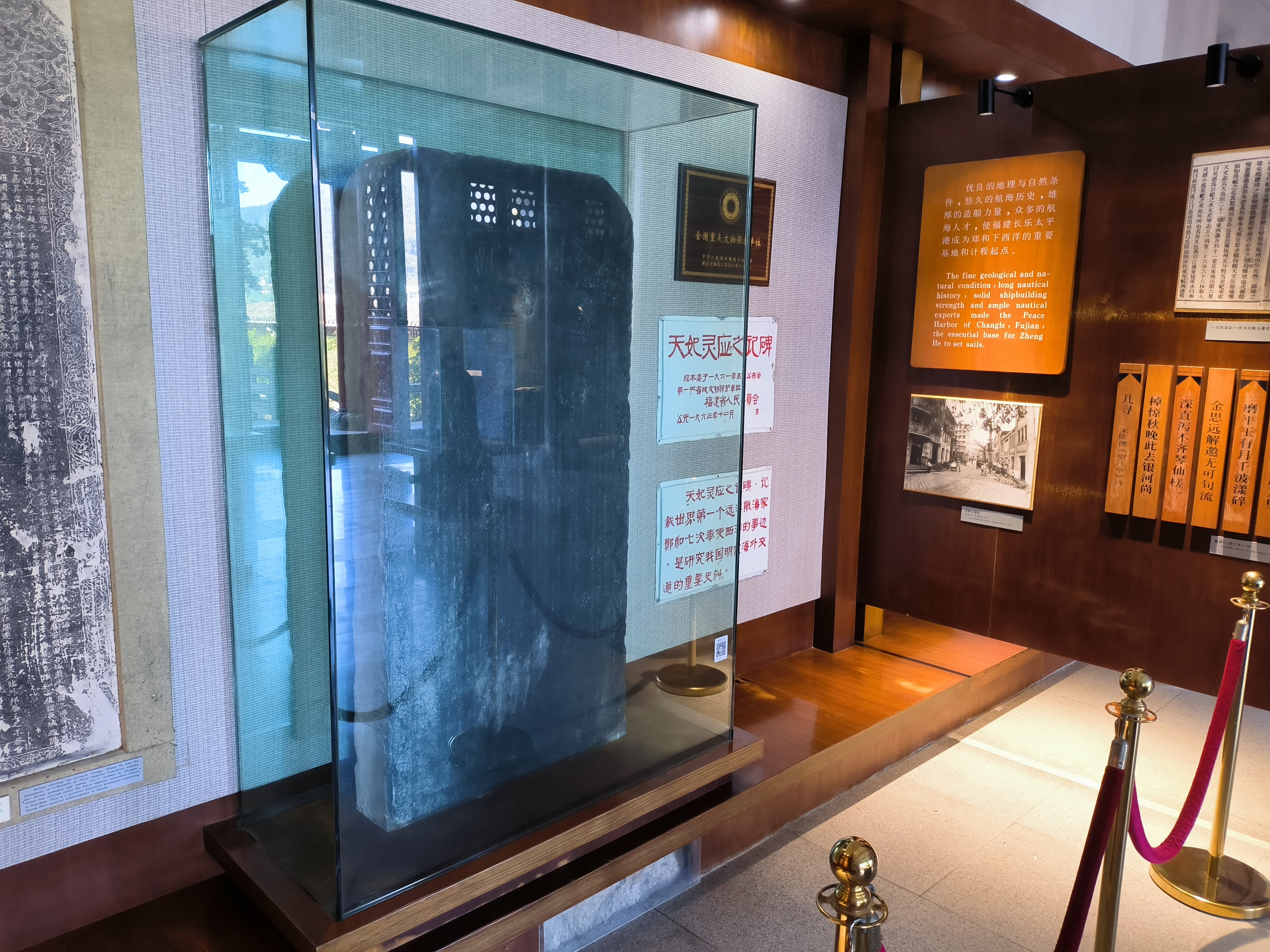
The stele bearing the Changle inscription composed by Zheng He and his associates

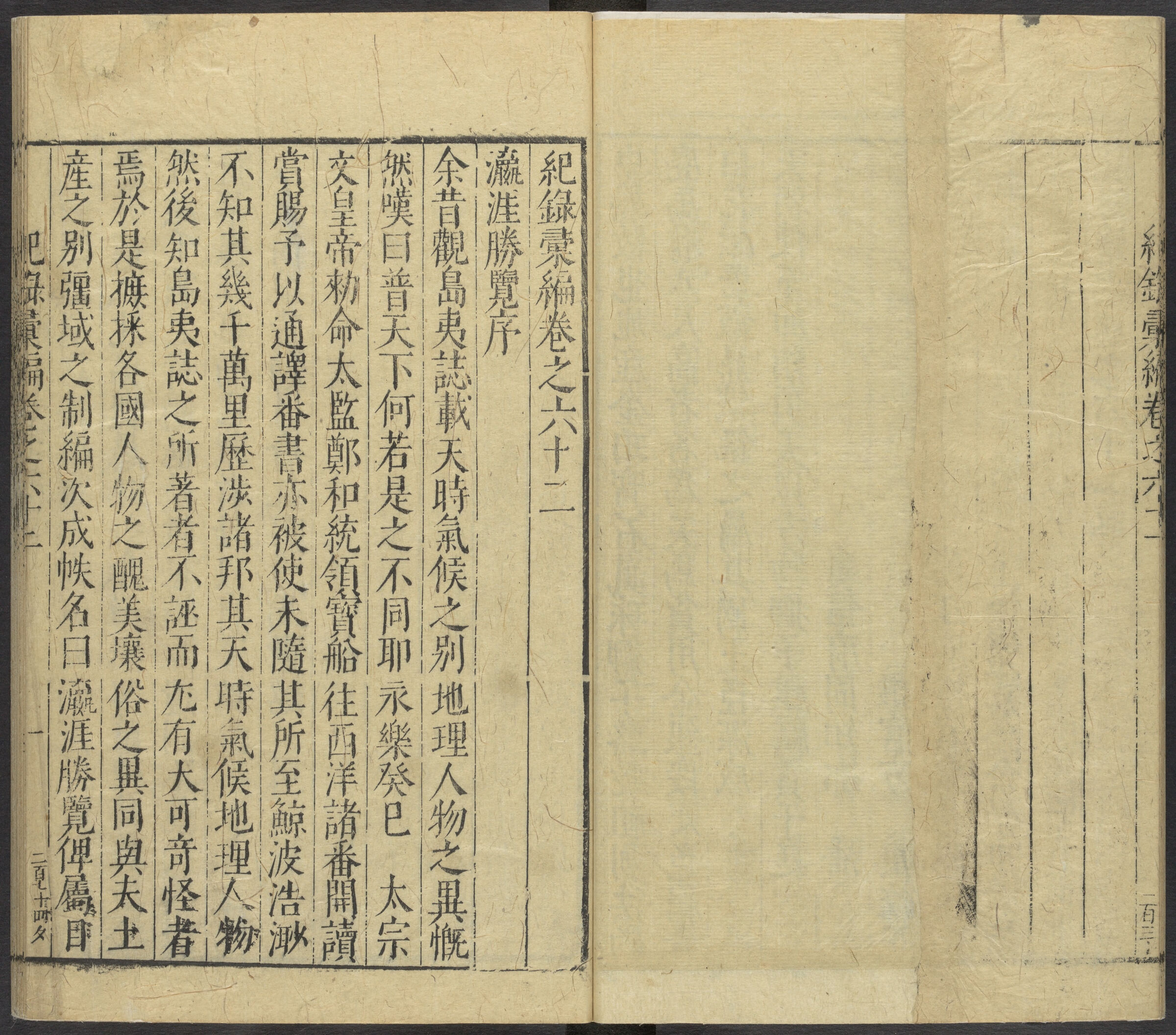
First page of Ma Huan's Yingya Shenglan, published in 1451, as collected in the Jilu Huibian, published in 1617 (Harvard Library)

There are several extant contemporary accounts, such as Ma Huan's Yingya Shenglan [瀛涯勝覽], Fei Xin's Xingcha Shenglan [星槎勝覽], and Gong Zhen's Xiyang Fanguo Zhi [西洋番國志]. These three works are important first-hand accounts, as their authors personally took part in the expeditions. Ma served as an interpreter on the fourth, sixth, and seventh treasure voyage. He collaborated with Guo Chongli, who participated in three of the voyages, on his work. Fei served as a soldier on the third, fifth, and seventh voyage. Gong served as Zheng He's private secretary on the seventh voyage. These three sources provide observations on the political, economic, social, cultural, and religious conditions of the lands visited throughout the voyages. Furthermore, the Liujiagang and Changle inscriptions, which were engraved on stone steles, are valuable records composed by Zheng and his associates. The stele bearing the Liujiagang inscription was lost, but the text was reproduced in Qian Gu's Wudu Wencui Xuji [吴都文粹续集] (Ming dynasty).

The Ming Shilu [明實錄] provides a lot of the information relating to the voyages, particularly the exchange of ambassadors. The work is divided into individual sections about the reigns of Ming emperors. Zheng lived through the reigns of five Ming emperors, but he directly served three emperors. He is mentioned in the Taizong Shilu of the Yongle reign, the Renzong Shilu of the Hongxi reign, and the Xuanzong Shilu of the Xuande reign. The Taizong Shilu combined the second and third voyages into one expedition. This was reproduced by the Mingshi. The conflation of these two voyages into one voyage caused Zheng's Palembang journey from 1424 to 1425 (Note: Duyvendak (1939, 387) and Mills (1970, 8–9) made the conclusion that the recorded Palembang journey never happened. However, Dreyer (2007, 96) states that it cannot be proven whether it did or did not happen.) to be wrongly construed as the sixth voyage to fulfill the count of seven voyages. However, the Liujiagang and Changle inscriptions make a clear distinction between the second and third voyage, as they correctly date the second voyage from 1407 to 1409 and the third voyage from 1409 to 1411.

A number of later works contain accounts about the voyages. These include the Mingshi [明史] (1739), Huang Xingzeng's Xiyang Chaogong Dianlu [西洋朝貢典錄] (1520), Zheng Xiao's Wuxuebian [吾學編] (ca. 1522), Lu Rong's Shuyuan Zaji [菽園雜記; 'Bean Garden Miscellany'] (1475), Yan Congjian's Shuyu Zhouzilu [殊域周咨錄; 'Record of Despatches Concerning the Different Countries'] (1520), and Gu Qiyuan's Kezuo Zhuiyu [客座贅語; 'Boring Talks for My Guests'] (ca. 1628). Zhu Yunming's Qianwen Ji ['A Record of Things Once Heard'] (ca. 1526) contains his Xia Xiyang [下西洋; 'Down the Western Ocean'], which provides a detailed itinerary of the seventh voyage. Mao Yuanyi's Wubei Zhi [武備志] (1628) preserves the Mao Kun map [茅坤圖], which is largely based on material from the voyages. Li Zhaoxiang's Longjiang Chuanchang Zhi [龍江船廠志; 'Record of the Dragon River Shipyard'] (preface 1553) states that the plans for the treasure ships had disappeared from the shipyard.

Luo Maodeng's Sanbao Taijian Xiyang Ji Tongsu Yanyi [三寶太監西洋記通俗演義] (1597) is a novel about the exploits of Zheng and his fleet. In the preface, Luo states that Chinese maritime power was essential to maintain world order. In Luo's work, Zheng sailed the oceans in search of a sacred imperial seal to restore harmony in the Middle Kingdom. Finlay (1992) remarks that the story gives the suggestion that, as Zheng never actually finds this seal, the world order cannot be restored by any other means than military force. Luo's novel contains a description of different classes of ships with their sizes: the 36 nine-masted treasure ships (baochuan) were 44.4 by 18 zhang, the 700 eight-masted horse ships (machuan) were 37 by 15 zhang, the 240 seven-masted grain ships or supply ships (liangchuan) were 28 by 12 zhang, the 300 six-masted billet ships or troop transports (zuochuan) were 24 by 9.4 zhang, and the 180 five-masted combat ships or warships proper (zhanchuan) were 18 by 6.8 zhang. Dreyer (2007) argues that this work holds no evidential value as a historical source, but notes that Duyvendak (1953) thinks that it may be based on some truth.

The Kezuo Zhuiyu and the Shuyu Zhouzilu describe the following circumstances of what happened to the official archives about the expeditions. During the reign of the Chenghua Emperor (r. 1465–1487), an order was issued to retrieve the documents concerning the expeditions to the Western Ocean from the Ministry of War archives. However, the official Liu Daxia had hidden and burned the documents. He dismissed the accounts as "deceitful exaggerations of bizarre things far removed from the testimony of people's ears and eyes."

The Shuyu Zhouzilu adds the following to the story. The Minister of War Xiang Zhong (in office 1474–1477) sent a clerk to retrieve the documents, but the clerk could not find them after several days of searching. Liu eventually confessed and justified his actions to Xiang by stating that "the expeditions of Sanbao to the Western Ocean wasted tens of myriads of money and grain, and moreover the people who met their deaths [on these expeditions] may be counted by the myriads. Although he returned with wonderful things, what benefit was it to the state? This was merely an action of bad government of which ministers should severely disapprove. Even if the old archives were still preserved they should be destroyed in order to suppress [a repetition of these things] at the root." Xiang Zhong was recorded to have been impressed by this explanation.

The Mingshi, the Xuanzong Shilu, and the Mingshi Jishi Benmo [明史紀事本末] attribute the reason for the suppression and destruction of the archived records to prevent the eunuch Wang Zhi from consulting it for his invasion of Vietnam. Dreyer (2007) notes that Liu could not have had access to the records and doubts his alleged involvement. Duyvendak (1939) states that the Ministry of War officials were not influential enough to stop the retrieval of the documents and speculates that Liu may have destroyed them with the Minister of War's approval. Schottenhammer (2021) states that it is unclear whether Liu really hid and burned the documents, but she surmises that the documents were possibly destroyed in the chaos when Beijing was captured by the rebel Li Zicheng and his army in the 17th century.

Suryadinata (2005) remarks that Southeast Asian sources also provide information about the voyages, but that their reliability should be scrutinized as these local histories can be intertwined with legends but still remain relevant in the collective memories of the people concerned. This includes the Malay Annals of Semarang and Cerbon, a text containing accounts that often lack in historicity, which records several interactions between local Muslim communities and the Chinese. As such, he highlights the difficulties of doing research about the role of the Chinese voyages in the Islamization of Java and Malacca, because these activities are not mentioned in the Chinese chronicles and local accounts may contain more legend than history.

Arabic sources provide insight on the dates of the fleet's arrival and course of events at various locations in the Arabic region, which supplements the general time frames provided in Chinese sources. It also offers insight about the commodity exchange, such as which commodities were traded and what value was placed on Chinese trade goods or gifts. The Tarih al-Yaman fi d-daulati r-Rasuliya (ca. 1440) is an example of an Arabic text that adds to the insight about the dates and commodity exchange. The Qurrat al-Uyun fi Akhbar al-Yaman al-Maimun (1461–1537) describes an encounter between Rasulid Sultan al-Nasir Ahmad (r. 1400–1424) and Chinese envoys, providing an example of a ruler who willingly accedes to the requested protocol of the tributary relationship in the unique perspective of a non-Chinese party. The Kitab as-Suluk li-ma rifat duwal al-muluk (1436–1442), a text from Mamluk Egypt, describes the contacts between the Chinese and the Mamluk rulers, which adds to the dating and understanding of the expedition to Mecca during the seventh voyage.

=== Legacy ===
It is now about 80 years since there arrived in this city of Chalicut certain vessels of white Christians, who wore their hair long like Germans, and had no beards except around the mouth, such as are worn at Constantinople by cavaliers and courtiers. They landed, wearing a cuirass, helmet, and vizor, and carrying a certain weapon [sword] attached to a spear. Their vessels are armed with bombards, shorter than those in use with us. Once every two years they return with 20 or 25 vessels. They are unable to tell what people they are, nor what merchandise they bring to this city, save that it includes very fine linen-cloth and brass-ware. They load spices. Their vessels have four masts like those of Spain. If they were Germans it seems to me that we should have had some notice about them; possibly they may be Russians if they have a port there. On the arrival of the captain we may learn who these people are, for the Italian-speaking pilot, who was given him by the Moorish king, and whom he took away contrary to his inclinations, is with him, and may be able to tell.

— Girolamo Sernigi (1499) about the then-unknown Chinese visitors

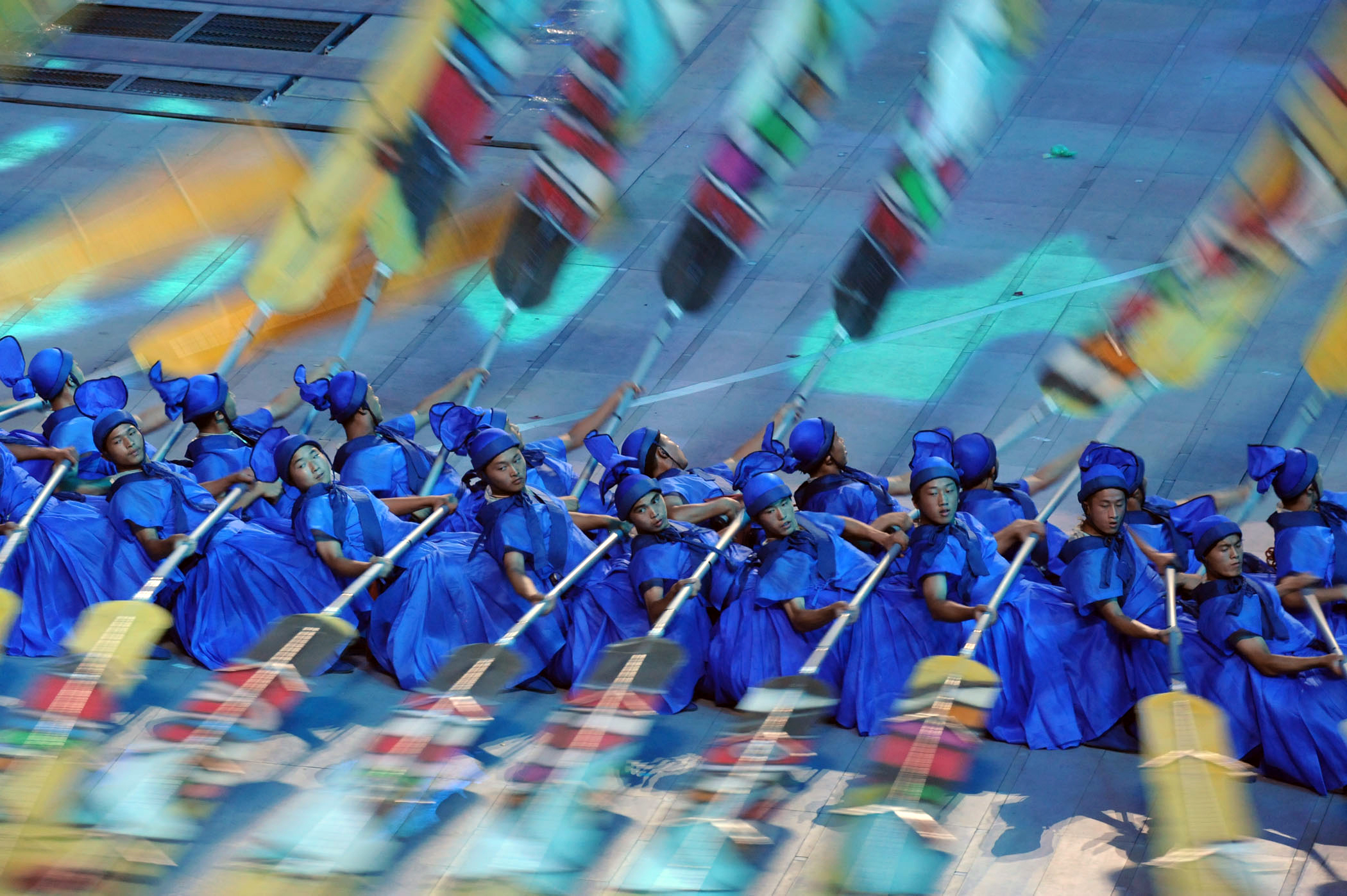
A 2008 Summer Olympics opening ceremony performance representing the voyages

In 1499, shortly before Vasco da Gama's return from India to Portugal, Girolamo Sernigi reported on the Portuguese accounts from da Gama's expedition that "certain vessels of white Christians" had made port at Calicut on the Malabar coast generations before their arrival. He speculated that these unknown mariners could have been the Germans or the Russians, but concluded that they may learn who those people are when da Gama arrives. After his arrival at Calicut, da Gama began hearing tales of pale bearded men who sailed with their giant ships along the local coastal waters of Calicut generations before. The Portuguese had encountered Malabar traditions that preserved the memory of the Ming treasure voyages led by Zheng He, but they were not aware that these tales were about his fleet. They would eventually discover that these unknown mariners were the Chinese. Da Gama's men were apparently even mistaken for the Chinese at first on arrival at the East African coast, because the Chinese were the last pale-skinned strangers arriving in large wooden ships in the memories of the East African people.

In the late 16th century, Juan González de Mendoza wrote that "it is plainly seene that [the Chinese] did come with the shipping unto the Indies, having conquered al that is from China, unto the farthest part thereof. [...] So that at this day there is great memory of them [...] The like notice and memory is there in the kingdom of Calicut, wheras be many trees and fruits, that the naturals of that countrie do say, were brought thither by the Chinos, when that they were lords and governours of that countrie."

Many present-day Chinese people perceive that these expeditions were conducted in accordance with Confucian ideals. During a Harvard University speech in November 1997, President Jiang Zemin praised Zheng for spreading Chinese culture abroad. Since 2005, in commemoration of the voyages, China annually celebrates its National Maritime Day on 11 July. That year also marked the 600th anniversary of Zheng's maiden voyage.

Although the present-day popular narrative may emphasize the peaceful nature of the voyages, especially in terms of the absence of territorial conquest and colonial subjugation, it overlooks the heavy militarization of the Chinese treasure fleet to exercise power projection and thereby promote its interests. In present-day Chinese political discourse, with rising developments in China's maritime capabilities and ambitions, the voyages are evoked to underscore a peaceful emergence of modern China. By drawing parallels between contemporary China and the historical narrative as provided by these voyages, the political process serves to stimulate national pride, shape national identity, reaffirm a maritime identity, legitimize the development of maritime power, provide an image of a harmonious and peaceful development, highlight interconnectedness with the broader world, and provide contrast to the violent nature of western colonialism. As such, the voyages play an important role in China's promotion of maritime power as a dominant strategic paradigm and soft power diplomacy in the maritime region.

== Bibliography ==
- Brook, Timothy (1998). "Communications and Commerce". The Cambridge History of China, Volume 8: The Ming Dynasty, 1398–1644, Part 2. Cambridge: Cambridge University Press. ISBN 978-0-521-24333-9.
- Chan, Hok-lam (1998). "The Chien-wen, Yung-lo, Hung-hsi, and Hsüan-te reigns, 1399–1435". The Cambridge History of China, Volume 7: The Ming Dynasty, 1368–1644, Part 1. Cambridge: Cambridge University Press. ISBN 978-0-521-24332-2.
- Chang, Peter (2021). "Admiral Zhenghe and the West: A Comparative Analysis in Confucian and Christian Civilisation Powers". Al-Shajarah: Journal of the International Institute of Islamic Thought and Civilization. 26 (2): 159–176.
- Chen, Zhongping (2019). "Toward a Global Network Revolution: Zheng He's Maritime Voyages and Tribute-Trade Relations Between China and the Indian Ocean World". China and Asia. 1 (1): 3–49. doi:10.1163/2589465X-00101002.
- Church, Sally K. (2004). "The Giraffe of Bengal: A Medieval Encounter in Ming China". The Medieval History Journal. 7 (1): 1–37. doi:10.1177/097194580400700101. S2CID 161549135.
- Church, Sally K. (2005). "Zheng He: An Investigation Into the Plausibility of 450-ft Treasure Ships". Monumenta Serica. 53: 1–43. doi:10.1179/mon.2005.53.1.001. S2CID 161434221.
- Church, Sally K. (2008). "Zheng He". Encyclopaedia of the History of Science, Technology, and Medicine in Non‑Western Cultures (2nd ed.). New York: Springer. ISBN 978-1-4020-4425-0.
- Deng, Hui; Li, Xin (2011). "The Asian Monsoons and Zheng He's Voyages to the Western Ocean". Journal of Navigation. 64 (2): 207–218. doi:10.1017/S0373463310000469. S2CID 128761254.
- Dooley, Howard J. (2012). "The Great Leap Outward: China's Maritime Renaissance". The Journal of East Asian Affairs. 26 (1): 53–76. JSTOR 23257908.
- Dreyer, Edward L. (2007). Zheng He: China and the Oceans in the Early Ming Dynasty, 1405–1433. New York: Pearson Longman. ISBN 978-0-321-08443-9.
- Duyvendak, J. J. L. (1939). "The True Dates of the Chinese Maritime Expeditions in the Early Fifteenth Century". T'oung Pao. 34 (5): 341–413. doi:10.1163/156853238X00171. JSTOR 4527170.
- Fairbank, John King (1942). "Tributary Trade and China's Relations With the West". The Far Eastern Quarterly. 1 (2): 129–149. doi:10.2307/2049617. JSTOR 2049617. S2CID 161481668.
- Finlay, Robert (1992). "Portuguese and Chinese Maritime Imperialism: Camoes's Lusiads and Luo Maodeng's Voyage of the San Bao Eunuch". Comparative Studies in Society and History. 34 (2): 225–241. doi:10.1017/S0010417500017667. JSTOR 178944. S2CID 144362957.
- Finlay, Robert (2008). "The Voyages of Zheng He: Ideology, State Power, and Maritime Trade in Ming China". Journal of the Historical Society. 8 (3): 327–347. doi:10.1111/j.1540-5923.2008.00250.x.
- Holmes, James R.; Yoshihara, Toshi (2008). "China's Naval Ambitions in the Indian Ocean". Journal of Strategic Studies. 31 (3): 367–394. doi:10.1080/01402390802024700.
- Holt, John Clifford (1991). Buddha in the Crown: Avalokiteśvara in the Buddhist Traditions of Sri Lanka. Oxford: Oxford University Press. ISBN 978-0-19-506418-6.
- Jost, Alexander (2019). ""He Did Not Kiss the Earth Between His Hands": Arabic Sources on the Arrivals of the Zheng He Fleet in Aden and Mecca (1419–1432)". Early Global Interconnectivity Across the Indian Ocean World, Volume I: Commercial Structures and Exchanges. Cham: Palgrave Macmillan. ISBN 978-3-319-97666-2.
- Kutcher, Norman A. (2020). "Qing Dynasty Perceptions of Zheng He and His Voyages". China and Asia. 2 (1): 163–175. doi:10.1163/2589465X-00201006.
- Lee, Jangwon (2010). "China's Looking Seaward: Zheng He's Voyage in the 21st Century". International Area Studies Review. 13 (3): 89–110. doi:10.1177/223386591001300305. S2CID 154903952.
- Levathes, Louise (1996). When China Ruled the Seas: The Treasure Fleet of the Dragon Throne, 1405–1433. New York: Oxford University Press. ISBN 978-0-19-511207-8.
- Liu, Yingsheng (2019). "An Open Knowledge System for Navigational Science: Zheng He's Maritime Expeditions and Sino-Foreign Overseas Exchange". China and Asia. 1 (1): 50–91. doi:10.1163/2589465X-00101003.
- Lo, Jung-pang (1958). "The Decline of the Early Ming Navy". Oriens Extremus. 5 (2): 149–168. JSTOR 43383349.
- Mills, J. V. G. (1954). "Chinese Coastal Maps". Imago Mundi. 11: 151–168. doi:10.1080/03085695408592067. JSTOR 1150192.
- Mills, J. V. G. (1970). Ying-yai Sheng-lan: 'The Overall Survey of the Ocean's Shores' [1433]. Cambridge: Cambridge University Press. ISBN 978-0-521-01032-0.
- Ming, Wan (2005). "Zheng He's Voyages to the Western Oceans: 3 Books, 1 Map, 1 Novel, 1 Play, and 7 Steles". Ming Studies (51–52): 31–42. doi:10.1179/014703705788762672.
- Ming, Wan (2019). "Zheng He's Seven Voyages Into the Namoli Ocean–the Indian Ocean". China and Asia. 1 (1): 92–125. doi:10.1163/2589465X-00101004. S2CID 188578313.
- Needham, Joseph; Wang, Ling (1995) [1959]. Science and Civilisation in China: Volume 3, Mathematics and the Sciences of the Heavens and the Earth. Cambridge, England: Cambridge University Press. ISBN 978-0-521-05801-8.
- Needham, Joseph (1971). Science and Civilisation in China, Volume 4: Physics and Physical Technology, Part 3: Civil Engineering and Nautics. Cambridge: Cambridge University Press. ISBN 978-0-521-07060-7.
- Nohara, Jun J. (2017). "Sea Power as a Dominant Paradigm: The Rise of China's New Strategic Identity". Journal of Contemporary East Asia Studies. 6 (2): 210–232. doi:10.1080/24761028.2017.1391623.
- O'Rourke, Kevin H.; Williamson, Jeffrey G. (2009). "Did Vasco da Gama Matter for European Markets?". The Economic History Review. 62 (3): 655–684. doi:10.1111/j.1468-0289.2009.00468.x. S2CID 154740598.
- Ray, Haraprasad (1987a). "An Analysis of the Chinese Maritime Voyages Into the Indian Ocean During Early Ming Dynasty and Their Raison d'Etre". China Report. 23 (1): 65–87. doi:10.1177/000944558702300107. S2CID 154116680.
- Ray, Haraprasad (1987b). "The Eighth Voyage of the Dragon That Never Was: An Enquiry Into the Causes of Cessation of Voyages During Early Ming Dynasty". China Report. 23 (2): 157–178. doi:10.1177/000944558702300202. S2CID 155029177.
- Schottenhammer, Angela (2019). "Introduction". Early Global Interconnectivity Across the Indian Ocean World, Volume I: Commercial Structures and Exchanges. Cham: Palgrave Macmillan. ISBN 978-3-319-97666-2.
- Schottenhammer, Angela (2021). "Consolidating Southeast Asia and the Meaning of Force in History: Pax Ming and the Case of Chen Zuyi 陳祖義". China and Asia. 3 (1): 130–168. doi:10.1163/2589465X-030105.
- Sen, Tansen (2016). "The Impact of Zheng He's Expeditions on Indian Ocean Interactions". Bulletin of the School of Oriental and African Studies. 79 (3): 609–636. doi:10.1017/S0041977X16001038.
- Siu, Yiu (2023). "The Cessation of Zheng He's Voyages and the Beginning of Private Sailings: Fiscal Competition Between Emperors and Bureaucrats". Journal of Chinese History. 8: 95–114. doi:10.1017/jch.2022.45. S2CID 258586977.
- Suryadinata, Leo (2005a). "Introduction". Admiral Zheng He & Southeast Asia. Singapore: International Zheng He Society. ISBN 978-981-230-329-5.
- Suryadinata, Leo (2005b). "Zheng He, Semarang and the Islamization of Java: Between History and Legend". Admiral Zheng He & Southeast Asia. Singapore: International Zheng He Society. ISBN 978-981-230-329-5.
- Tan, Ta Sen (2005). "Did Zheng He Set Out to Colonize Southeast Asia?". Admiral Zheng He & Southeast Asia. Singapore: International Zheng He Society. ISBN 978-981-230-329-5.
- Tsai, Shih-shan Henry (2001). Perpetual Happiness: The Ming Emperor Yongle. Seattle: University of Washington Press. ISBN 978-0-295-98109-3.
- Wang, Gungwu (1998). "Ming Foreign Relations: Southeast Asia". The Cambridge History of China, Volume 8: The Ming Dynasty, 1398–1644, Part 2. Cambridge: Cambridge University Press. ISBN 978-0-521-24333-9.
- Wang, Yuan-kang (2015). "The Myth of Chinese Exceptionalism: A Historical Perspective on China's Rise". Responding to China's Rise: US and EU Strategies. Springer. ISBN 978-3-319-10033-3.
- Wills, John E. Jr. (1998). "Relations With Maritime Europeans, 1514–1662". The Cambridge History of China, Volume 8: The Ming Dynasty, 1398–1644, Part 2. Cambridge: Cambridge University Press. ISBN 978-0-521-24333-9.
- Zheng, Yangwen (2014). China on the Sea: How the Maritime World Shaped Modern China. Leiden: Brill. ISBN 978-90-04-19477-9.
