= History of Palembang =

Palembang is the capital city of South Sumatra province of Indonesia. Currently, this city is the oldest existing city in Indonesia, dates back to 7th century. Palembang was once the capital city of Srivijaya, a Palembang empire which ruled parts of the western archipelago and controlled maritime trade routes especially in the Strait of Malacca. Palembang incorporated into Dutch East Indies in 1825 after the abolishment of Palembang Sultanate. Palembang is chartered as a city on 1 April 1906. Palembang today is the second largest city in Sumatra and the ninth largest city in Indonesia. The city has become host of several international events, including 2011 Southeast Asian Games and 2018 Asian Games.

== Srivijaya period ==
Srivijaya Archaeological Park located Southwest from Palembang city centre (green). The site forming axis connecting Bukit Seguntang and Musi River.

The Kedukan Bukit Inscription, which is dated 682 AD, is the oldest inscription found in Palembang. The inscription tells of a king who acquires magical powers and leads a large military force over water and land, setting out from Tamvan delta, arriving at a place called "Matajap," and (in the interpretation of some scholars) founding the polity of Srivijaya. The "Matajap" of the inscription is believed to be Mukha Upang, a district of Palembang.

According to George Coedes, "in the second half of the 9th century Java and Sumatra were united under the rule of a Sailendra reigning in Java...its centre at Palembang."

As the capital of the Srivijaya kingdom, this second oldest city in Southeast Asia has been an important trading centre in maritime Southeast Asia for more than a millennium. The kingdom flourished by controlling the international trade through the Strait of Malacca from the seventh to thirteenth century, establishing hegemony over polities in Sumatra and the Malay Peninsula. Sanskrit inscriptions and Chinese travelogues report that the kingdom prospered as an intermediary in the international trade between China and India. Because of the Monsoon, or biannual seasonal wind, after getting to Srivijaya, traders from China or India had to stay there for several months waiting the direction of the wind changes, or had to go back to China or India. Thus, Srivijaya grew to be the biggest international trade centre, and not only the market, but also infrastructures for traders such as lodging and entertainment also developed. It functioned as a cultural centre as well. Yijing, a Chinese Buddhist pilgrim who stayed in today's Palembang and Jambi in 671, recorded that there were more than a thousand Buddhist monks and learned scholars, sponsored by the kingdom to study religion in Palembang. He also recorded that there were many "states" under the kingdom called Srivijaya (Shili Foshi).

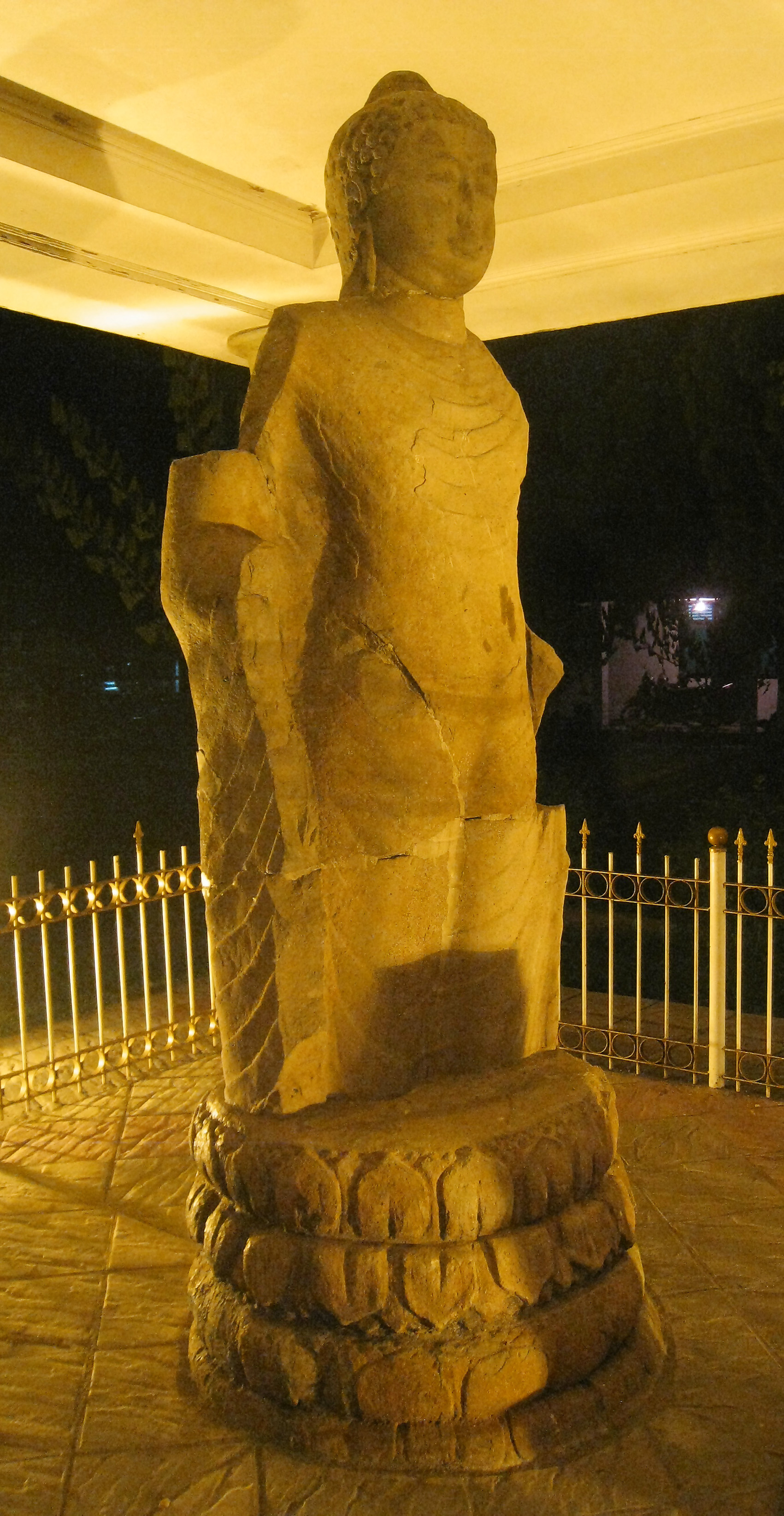
A statue of Buddha, discovered in Bukit Seguntang archaeological site, today displayed in Sultan Mahmud Badaruddin II Museum Palembang.

In 990, an army from the Kingdom of Mataram in Java attacked Srivijaya. Palembang was sacked and the palace was looted. Cudamani Warmadewa, however, requested protection from China. By 1006, the invasion was finally repelled. In retaliation, Srivijaya king sent his troops to assist King Wurawari of Luaram in his revolt against Mataram. In subsequent battles, Mataram Palace was destroyed and the royal family of Mataram executed.

In 1068, King Virarajendra Chola of the Chola dynasty of India conquered what is now Kedah from Srivijaya. Having lost many soldiers in the war and with its coffers almost empty due to the twenty-year disruption of trade, the reach of Srivijaya was diminished. Its territories began to free themselves from the suzerainty of Palembang and to establish many small kingdoms all over the former empire. Srivijaya finally declined with the military expedition by Javanese kingdoms in the thirteenth century.

== Post-Srivijaya period ==
Prince Parameswara fled from Palembang after being crushed by Javanese forces, The city was then plagued by pirates, notably Chen Zuyi and Liang Daoming. In 1407, Chen was confronted at Palembang by the returning Imperial treasure fleet under Admiral Zheng He. Zheng made the opening gambit, demanding Chen's surrender and the pirate quickly signalled agreement while preparing for a surprise pre-emptive strike. But details of his plan had been provided to Zheng by a local Chinese informant, and in the fierce battle that ensued, the Ming soldiers and Ming superior armada finally destroyed the pirate fleet and killed 5,000 of its men. Chen was captured and held for public execution in Nanjing in 1407. Peace was finally restored to the Strait of Malacca as Shi Jinqing was installed as Palembang's new ruler and incorporated into what would become a far-flung system of allies who acknowledged Ming supremacy in return for diplomatic recognition, military protection, and trading rights.

== Palembang Sultanate period ==
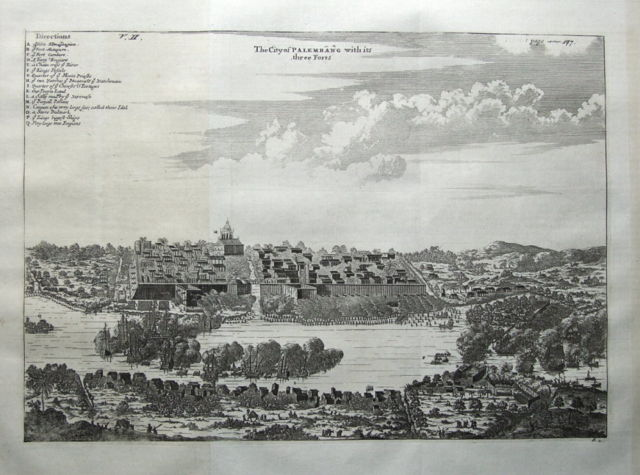
The walled city of Palembang with its three fortresses in 1682.

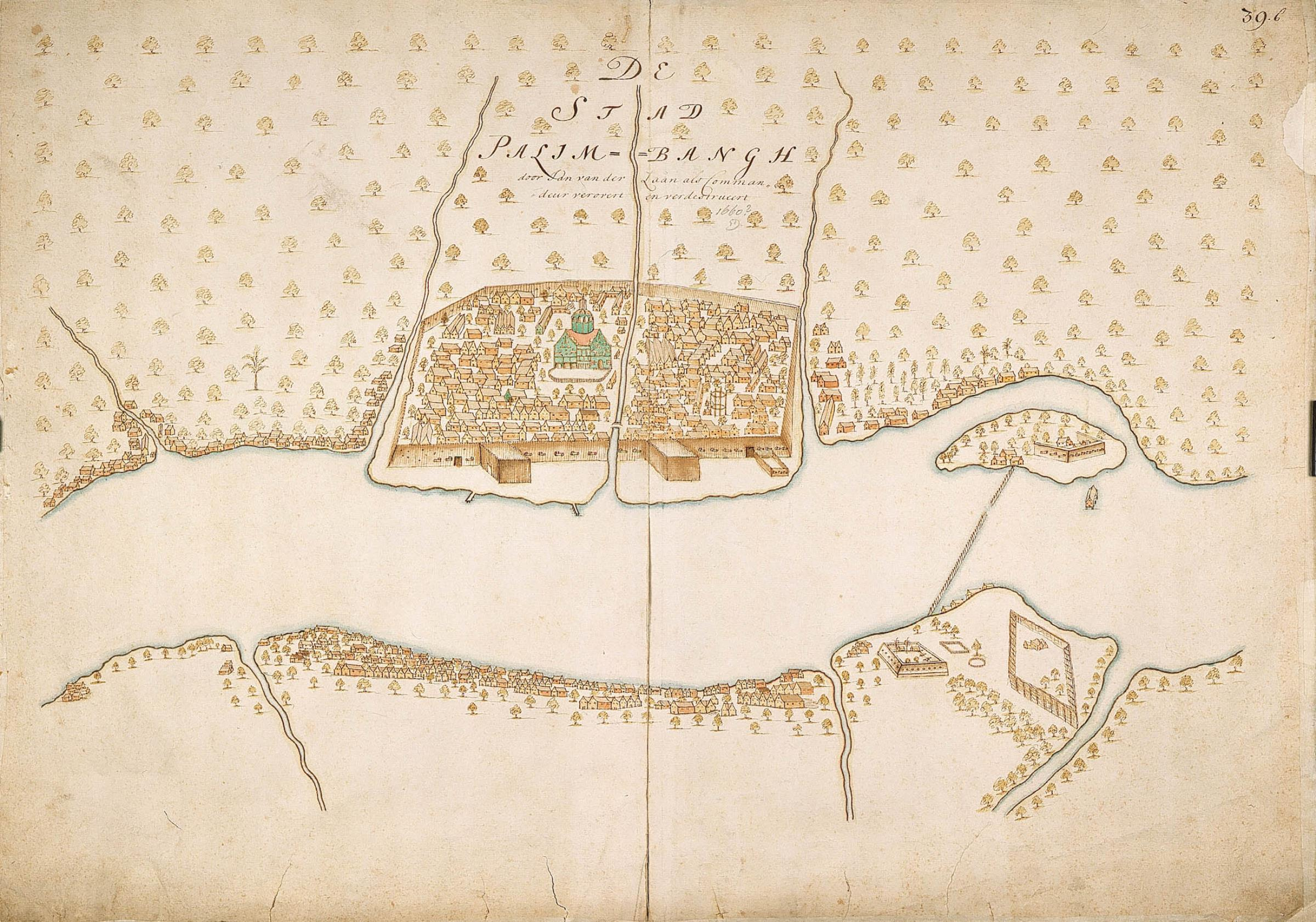
The city of Palembang around the 1660s

After Demak Sultanate fell under Kingdom of Pajang, a Demak nobleman, Geding Suro with his followers fled to Palembang and established a new dynasty. Islam become dominant in Palembang since this period. Grand Mosque of Palembang built in 1738 under the reign of Sultan Mahmud Badaruddin I Jaya Wikrama, completed in 1748. Settlement flourished along Musi River bank, some of houses built on rafts. The Sultanate enacted legislation that portion downstream of Seberang Ilir where the palace was located, was intended for residents of Palembang, whereas foreigners who were not citizens of Palembang was at the opposite bank of the palace called Seberang Ulu.

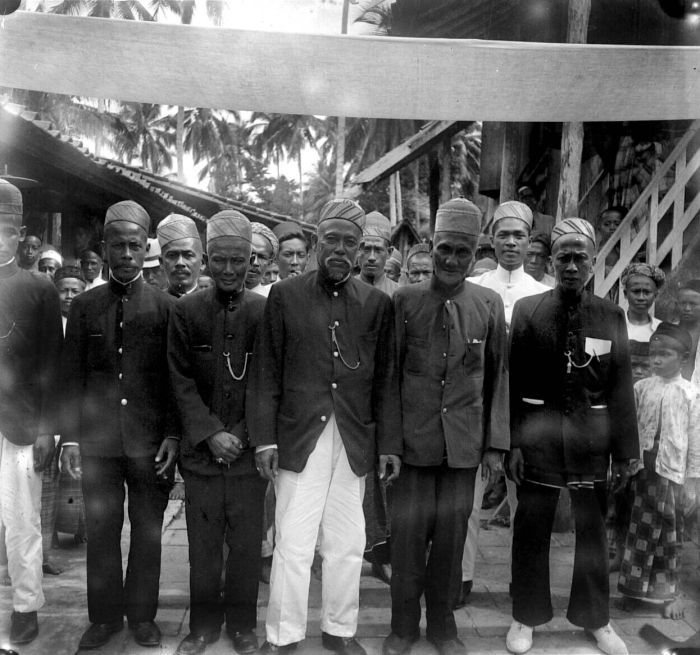
Local elders of Palembang during colonial period.

Several local rivals, such as Banten, Jambi, and Aceh threatened the existence of the Sultanate, meanwhile Dutch East India Company established a trade post in Palembang in 1619. In 1642, the company obtained monopoly right over pepper trading in the port. Tension mounted between the Dutch and the locals, peaked at 1657 when a Dutch ship was attacked in Palembang, gave a signal to the company to launch a punitive expedition in 1659 which burned the city to the ground.

During Napoleonic Wars in 1812, the sultan at that time, Mahmud Badaruddin II repudiated British claims to suzerainty, which was responded by British by attacking Palembang, sacking the court, and installing sultan's more cooperative younger brother, Najamuddin to the throne. The Dutch attempted to recover their influence at the court in 1816, but Sultan Najamuddin was uncooperative with them. An expedition launched by the Dutch in 1818 and captured Sultan Najamudin and exiled him to Batavia. A Dutch garrison was established in 1821, but sultan attempted an attack and a mass poisoning to the garrison, which were intervened by Dutch. Mahmud Badaruddin II was exiled to Ternate, and his palace was burned to the ground. The Sultanate was later abolished by Dutch and direct colonial rule was established.

== Colonial period ==
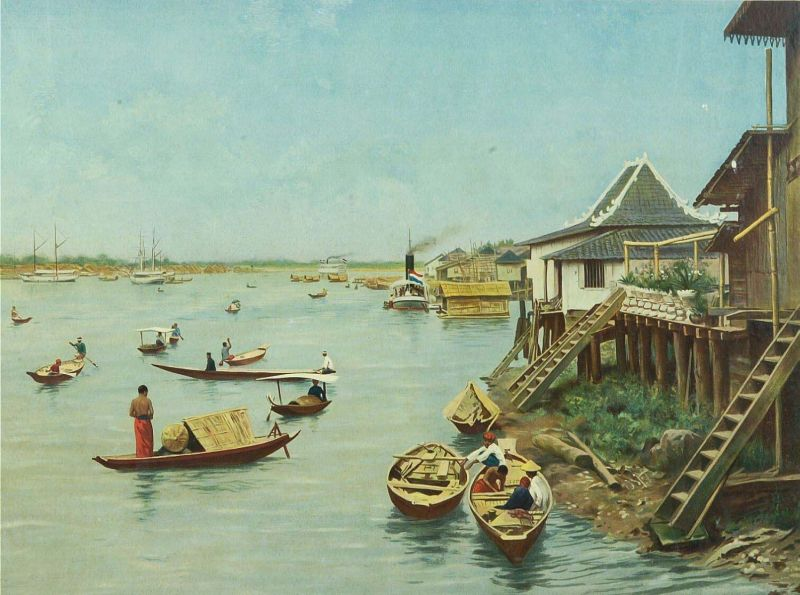
A painting of Palembang during Dutch rule.

Since the abolition of the Palembang Sultanate in 1825 by the Dutch, Palembang become the capital of Residency of Palembang, encompassing whole territory who will be South Sumatra province after independence, led by Jan Izaäk van Sevenhoven as its first resident.

From the late nineteenth century, with the introduction of new export crops by the Dutch companies, Palembang rose again as an economic centre. In the 1900s, the development of the petroleum and rubber industries caused unprecedented economic growth, which brought about the influx of migrants, an increase in urbanisation, and development of the socioeconomic infrastructure.

The emergence of rubber cultivation in South Sumatra began in the late 19th century. In the early 20th century, several major Western companies entered the area and operated rubber plantations. From the mid-1920s, rubber became the biggest export crop in the area, surpassing robusta coffee. Although there were large rubber estates owned by Western enterprises, rubber in Palembang was produced mainly by smallholders. By the 1920s, the Residency of Palembang (today's South Sumatra province) was ranked sixth among the regions of smallholder rubber production, becoming the largest of the smallholder rubber regions in the 1940s, producing 58,000 tons of rubber.

There were three petroleum companies in 1900: the Sumatra-Palembang Petroleum Company (Sumpal); the French-owned Muara Enim Petroleum Company; and the Musi Ilir Petroleum Company. The Sumpal was soon assimilated into the Royal Dutch, and the Muara Enim Co. and the Musi Ilir Co. were also assimilated into the Royal Dutch, in 1904 and in 1906, respectively. Based on this assimilation, Royal Dutch and Shell established the BPM, the operating company of Royal Dutch Shell, and opened an oil refinery at Plaju, on the shore of the Musi River in Palembang, in 1907. While BPM was the only operating company in this area until the 1910s, American oil companies launched their business in the Palembang region from the 1920s. Standard Oil of New Jersey established a subsidiary, the American Petroleum Company, and, to prevent Dutch laws to restrict the activities of foreign firms, the American Petroleum Company established its own subsidiary, the Netherlands Colonial Oil Company (Nederlandche Koloniale Petroleum Maatschapij, NKPM). The NKPM began to establish itself in Sungai Gerong area in the early 1920s, and completed the construction of pipelines to send 3,500 barrels per day from their oilfields to the refinery at Sungai Gerong. The two refinery complexes were like enclaves, separate urban centres with houses, hospitals, and other cultural facilities built by the Dutch and Americans. In 1933, Standard Oil incorporated the NKPM holdings into the Standard Vacuum Company, a new joint venture corporation, which was renamed the Standard Vacuum Petroleum Maatschappij (SVPM). Caltex (a subsidiary of the Standard Oil California and Texas Company) secured extensive exploration concessions in Central Sumatra (Jambi) in 1931. By 1938, the production of crude oil in the Netherlands East Indies totalled 7,398,000 metric tons, and the shares of the BPM reached seventy two percent, while the NKPM (StandardVacuum)’s share was twenty eight percent. Whereas the most prolific area in crude oil production was East Kalimantan until the late 1930s, since then Palembang and Jambi took over the position. All crude oil production in the NEI was processed at seven refineries at this time, especially at three large export refineries: the NKPM plant at Sungai Gerong, the BPM refineries at Plaju, and the one in Balikpapan. Thus Palembang held two of the three biggest oil refineries in the archipelago.

Coat of arms of Palembang during colonial era, adopted in 1925.

In the 1920s, with the guidance of Thomas Karsten, one of the pioneers of architectural project in the cities in the Netherlands East Indies, the Traffic Commission (Komisi Lalu Lintas) of Palembang was to improve inland transportation conditions in Palembang. The Commission reclaimed land from rivers and asphalted roads. Traffic plan in the city of Palembang was based on Karsten’s city plan, in which the Ilir was in the form of a road ring, starting form an edge of the Musi River. From then they built many smaller bridges on both sides of the Musi River, including the Wilhelmina Bridge over the Ogan River that vertically divides the Ulu area. The bridge was built in 1939 with the intention of connecting oil refineries in the eastern bank to western bank, where the Kertapati train station was located. In the late 1920s, ocean steamers navigated the Musi River on a regular basis.

In the 1930s, the Residency of Palembang was one of the "three giants" in the export economy of the Netherlands East Indies, together with the East Sumatran Plantation Belt and Southeast Kalimantan, and the city of Palembang was the most populous urban centre outside Java. Its population was 50,703 in 1905; it reached 109,069, while the population of Makassar and Medan was 86,662 and 74,976, respectively. It was surpassed only by three larger cities located in Java: Batavia, Surabaya and Semarang.

== Japanese occupation period ==
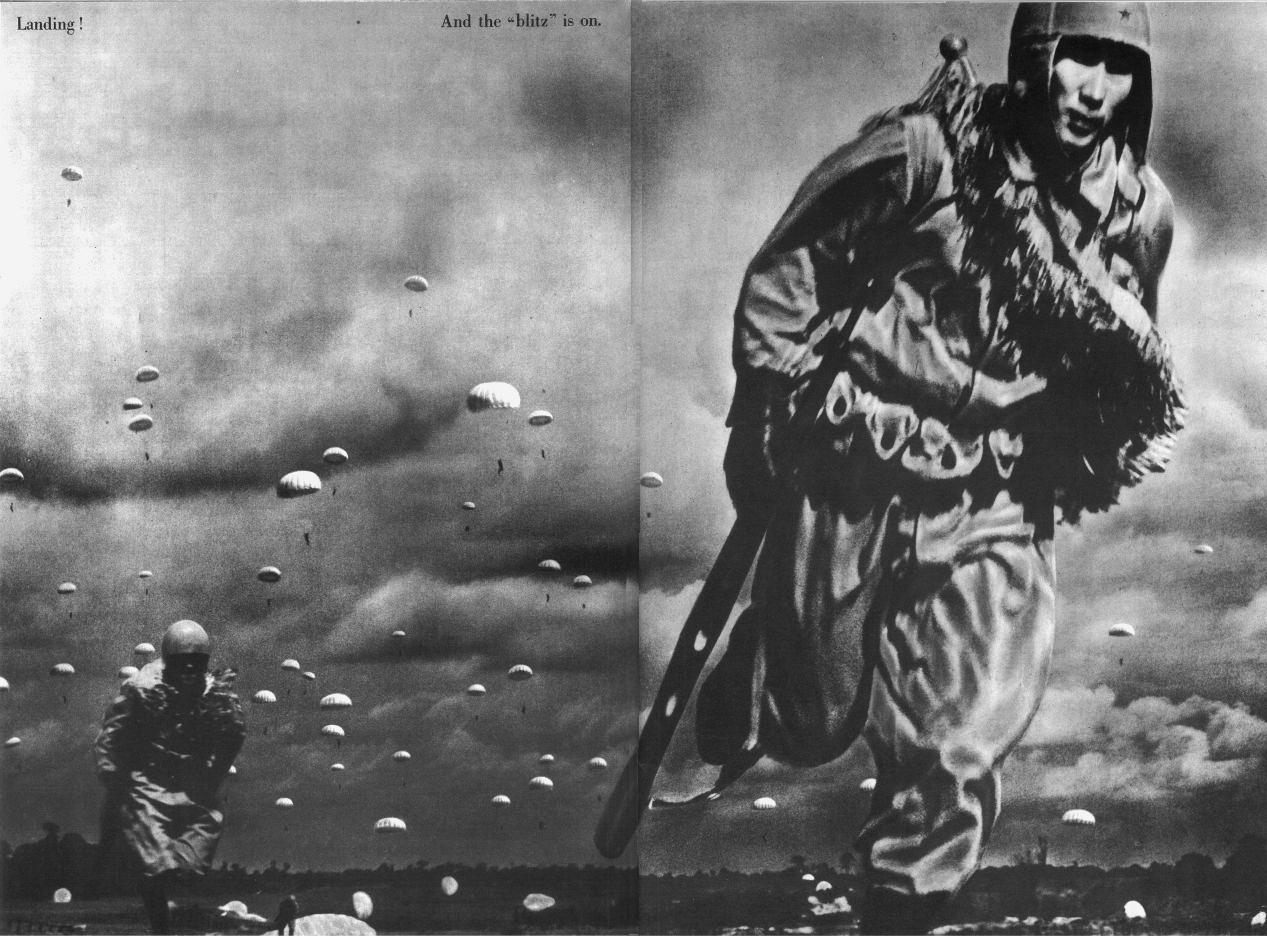
Imperial Japanese Army paratroopers are landing during the battle of Palembang, 13 February 1942.

Palembang was a high priority objective for Japanese forces, because it was the location of some finest oil refineries in Southeast Asia. An oil embargo had been imposed on Japan by the United States, the Netherlands, and the United Kingdom. With the area's abundant fuel supply and airfield, Palembang offered significant potential as a military base area, to both the Allies and the Japanese.

The main battle occurred during 13–16 February 1942. While the Allied planes were attacking Japanese shipping on 13 February, Kawasaki Ki-56 transport planes of the 1st, 2nd and 3rd Chutai, Imperial Japanese Army Air Force (IJAAF), dropped Teishin Shudan (Raiding Group) paratroopers over Pangkalan Benteng airfield. At the same time Mitsubishi Ki-21 bombers from the 98th Sentai dropped supplies for paratroopers. The formation was escorted by a large force of Nakajima Ki-43 fighters from the 59th and 64th Sentai. As many as 180 men from the Japanese 2nd Parachute Regiment, under Colonel Seiichi Kume, dropped between Palembang and Pangkalan Benteng, and more than 90 men came down west of the refineries at Plaju. Although the Japanese paratroopers failed to capture the Pangkalan Benteng airfield, at the Plaju oil refinery they managed to gain possession of the entire complex, which was undamaged. However, the second oil refinery in Sungai Gerong was successfully demolished by the Allies. A makeshift counter-attack by Landstorm troops and anti-aircraft gunners from Prabumulih managed to retake the complex but took heavy losses. The planned demolition failed to do any serious damage to the refinery, but the oil stores were set ablaze. Two hours after the first drop, another 60 Japanese paratroopers were dropped near Pangkalan Benteng airfield.

As the Japanese landing force approached Sumatra, the remaining Allied aircraft attacked it, and the Japanese transport ship Otawa Maru was sunk. Hurricanes flew up the rivers, machine-gunning Japanese landing craft. However, on the afternoon of 15 February, all Allied aircraft were ordered to Java, where a major Japanese attack was anticipated, and the Allied air units had withdrawn from southern Sumatra by the evening of 16 February 1942. Other personnel were evacuated via Oosthaven (now Bandar Lampung) by ships to Java or India.

The Japanese managed to restore production at both main refineries, and these petroleum products were significant in their war effort. Despite Allied air raids, production was largely maintained.

In August 1944 USAAF B-29 bombers, flying from India, raided the Palembang refineries in what was the longest range regular bombing mission of the war.

In January 1945, in Operation Meridian, the British Royal Navy Fleet Air Arm launched two major attacks on the two refinery complexes, against determined Japanese defence.

== National revolution period ==
On 8 October 1945, Resident of South Sumatra, Adnan Kapau Gani with all Gunseibu officers raised the Indonesian flag during a ceremony. On that day, it was announced that Palembang Residency was under control of republicans.

Palembang was occupied by the Dutch after an urban battle between the republicans and the Dutch on 1–5 January 1947, which is known as Pertempuran Lima Hari Lima Malam (the Battle of Five Days and Nights). There were three fronts during the battle: the Eastern Ilir front, the Western Ilir front, and the Ulu front. The battle ended with a ceasefire and the Republican forces were forced to retreat 20 kilometres (12 miles) from Palembang.

During the occupation, the Dutch formed the federal State of South Sumatra in September 1948. After the transfer of sovereignty on 27 December 1949, South Sumatra State, along with other federal states and the republic formed the short-lived United States of Indonesia before the states were abolished and integrated back into the unitary republic on 17 August 1950.

== Old Order and New Order period ==
During PRRI/Permesta rebellion, the rebel faction established Dewan Garuda (Garuda Council) in South Sumatra on 15 January 1957 under Lieutenant Colonel Barlian took over the local government of South Sumatra.

In April 1962, Indonesian government started the construction of Ampera Bridge which was completed and officially opened for public on 30 September 1965 by Minister/Commander of the Army Lieutenant General Ahmad Yani, only hours before he was killed by troops belonging to the 30 September Movement. At first, the bridge was known as the Bung Karno Bridge, after the president, but following his fall, it was renamed the Ampera Bridge. A second bridge in Palembang which crosses Musi River, Musi II Bridge was built on 4 August 1992.

On 6 December 1988, Indonesia government expanded Palembang's administrative area as far as 12 kilometers from the city center, with 9 villages from Musi Banyuasin integrated into 2 new districts of Palembang and 1 village from Ogan Komering Ilir integrated into Seberang Ulu I District.

During May 1998 riots of Indonesia, Palembang was also ravaged by riots with 10 burned shops, more than a dozen burned cars, and several injured people inflicted by rioters as students marching to the Provincial People's Representative Council office of South Sumatra. Thousands of police and soldiers were put on guard at various points in the city. The Volunteer Team for Humanity (Indonesian: Tim Relawan untuk Kemanusiaan, or TRUK) reported that cases of sexual assault also took place.

== Reformasi period ==
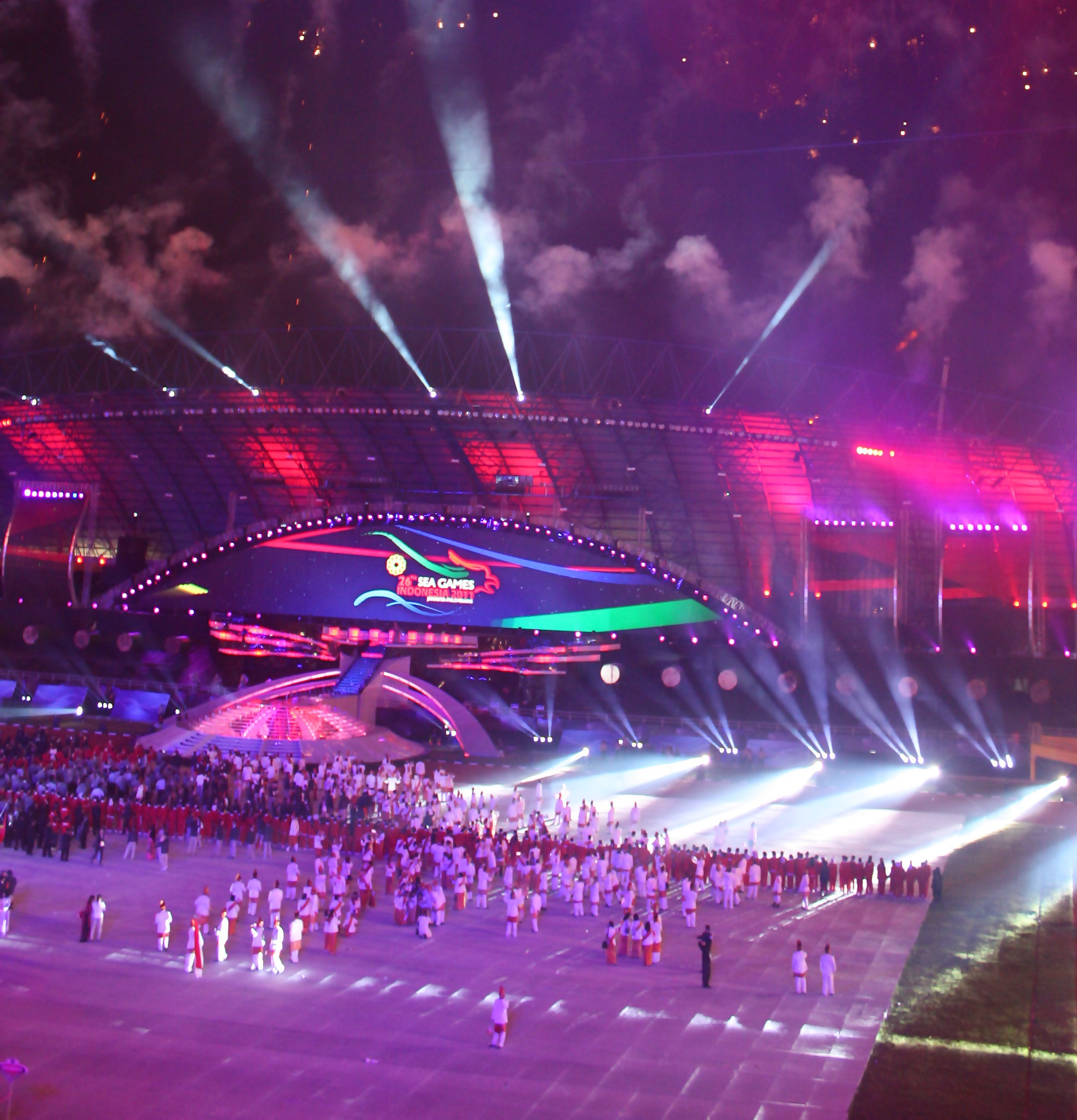
The opening ceremony of 2011 Southeast Asian Games in Jakabaring Stadium, Palembang, 11 November 2011.

In 1998, a sport complex along with its main stadium, Gelora Sriwijaya Stadium, was built in Jakabaring, completed in 2004. It served as venues for 2004 Pekan Olahraga Nasional. Palembang became host of Pekan Olahraga Nasional in 2004 after 47 years it was last held outside Java and 51 years in Sumatra. 7 years later, Palembang became the host of the 2011 Southeast Asian Games along with Jakarta. In 2013, Indonesian government decide to replace the host of 2013 Islamic Solidarity Games from Pekanbaru to Palembang because several problems occurred in the former host, including Riau Governor, Rusli Zainal who stumbled over a corruption scandal. Palembang, together again with Jakarta, will host the 2018 Asian Games.

Sixth president of Indonesia, Susilo Bambang Yudhoyono, declared Palembang as a "Water Tourism City" on 27 September 2005. More further on 5 January 2008, Palembang publicised its tourist attractions with the slogan "Visit Musi 2008".

Palembang completed its first flyover at Simpang Polda in September 2008. Second flyover in Jakabaring completed in 2015. In 2010, Palembang launched its bus transit system, Transmusi. Since 2015, Indonesian government began to upgrade Palembang's transportation capability with the construction of Indonesia's first light rail transit system from Sultan Mahmud Badaruddin II International Airport to Jakabaring, the city's toll roads, two Musi River bridges, and two flyovers, all expected to be operational before 2018 Asian Games. The toll road began its operation in October 2017.

== See also ==
- History of Indonesia
