= Timeline of the Ming treasure voyages =

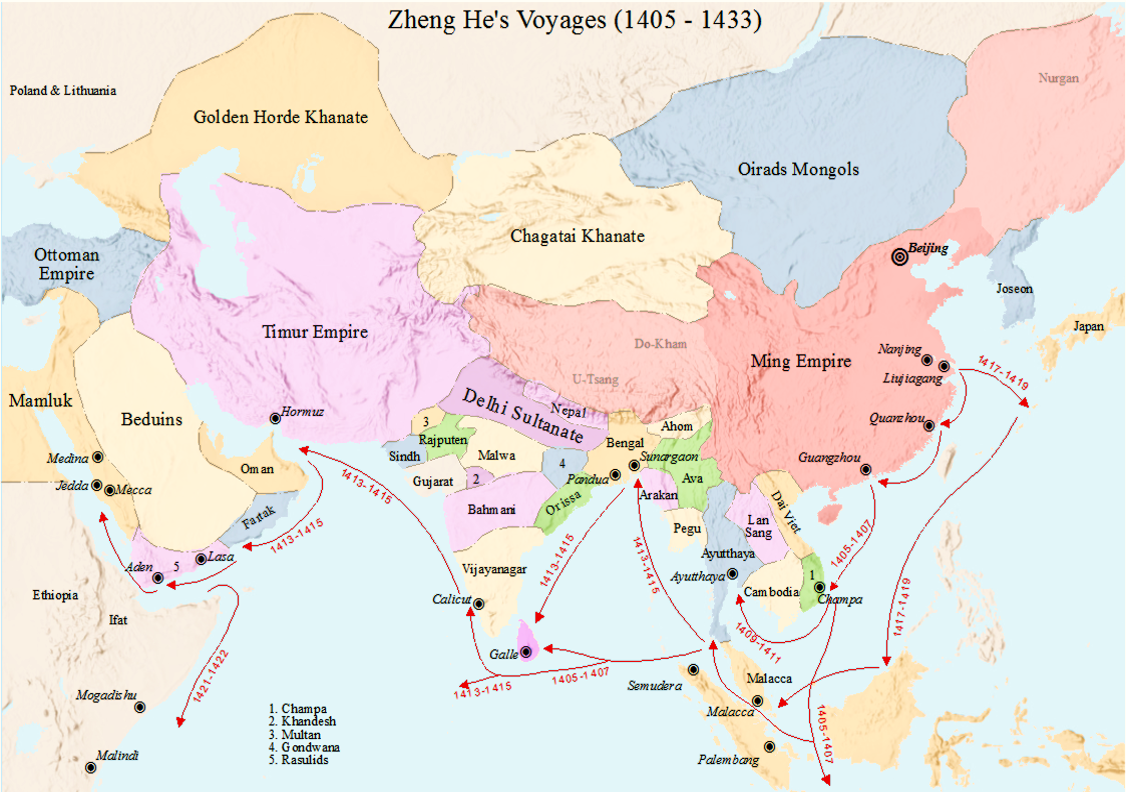
Voyages of Zheng He (1405 - 1433).

This is a timeline of the Ming dynasty treasure voyages from 1405 to 1433.

== 1370s ==
Year	Date	Event
1371		Ma He, son of Hajji, son of Hajji, son of Bayan, son of Ajall Shams al-Din Omar, is born in Kunyang Subdistrict, Yunnan, near Kunming

== 1380s ==
Year	Date	Event
1381		Ming conquest of Yunnan: Ming dynasty invades Yunnan and Ma He is captured; his father Hajji is killed at the age of 39
1385		Ma He is castrated and enters the service of Zhu Di

== 1390s ==
Year	Date	Event
1399	December	Jingnan Campaign: Ma He successfully defends Beiping's reservoirs

== 1400s ==
Year	Date	Event
1402	17 July	Zhu Di becomes the Yongle Emperor and promotes Ma He to the Grand Director (Taijian) of the Directorate of Palace Servants
1403	4 September	Orders are issued for the construction of 200 "seagoing transport ships"
1404	11 February	Yongle Emperor confers the surname Zheng on Ma He
1404	1 March	Orders are issued for the construction of 50 "seagoing ships"
1405	11 July	Zheng He and 27,800 men depart from Nanjing on 255 ships, of which 62 are treasure ships, "bearing imperial letters to the countries of the Western Ocean and with gifts to their kings of gold brocade, patterned silks, and colored silk gauze, according to their status." The fleet proceeds to Liujiagang where it is separated into squadrons and the crews pray to Mazu, goddess of sailors.
1405	August	Treasure fleet reaches the mouth of the Min River and assembles at Taiping Anchorage in Changle District
1405	December	Treasure fleet departs for Champa and after 15 days arrives at Qui Nhơn, where "most of the men take up fishing for a livelihood"
1406		Treasure fleet visits Malacca and Java before heading up the Straits of Malacca to Aru, Samudera Pasai Sultanate, and Lambri, where the people are described as "very honest and genuine," and from there 3 days to the Andaman Islands, and then 8 more days to the west coast of Ceylon where the king reacts with hostility. The fleet departs for Calicut, which is described as "the Great country of the Western Ocean"
1407		Treasure fleet makes the return voyage and stops at Malacca to pick up Parameswara and envoys
1407		Treasure fleet defeats Chen Zuyi's pirate fleet at Palembang. The Yongle Emperor establishes the Old Port Pacification Superintendency and appoints local resident Shi Jinqing as its first superintendent, overlapping with Majapahit's nominal claim of suzerainty over the region.
1407	2 October	Treasure fleet arrives at Nanjing
1407	5 October	Wang Hao is ordered to refit 249 "sea transport ships" in "preparation for embassies to the countries of the Western Ocean"
1407	23 October	Yongle Emperor issues orders for the second voyage and to confer formal investiture on the king of Calicut
1407	23 October	Yongle Emperor demands compensation from Java after the Western king’s troops killed over 170 of Zheng He's men during an ongoing civil war; he initially demands 60,000 liang of gold (~2,220 kg), later reducing the amount to 10,000 liang (~370 kg).
1407	29 October	Yongle Emperor bestows merit upon the officers and men of the treasure fleet
1407	30 October	A eunuch Grand Director departs with an imperial letter for the king of Champa
1407		Zheng He departs with a fleet of 249 ships and takes a route similar to the first voyage with the addition of stops at Jiayile, Abobadan, Ganbali, Quilon, and Cochin
1408	14 February	Orders for the construction of 48 treasure ships are issued from the Ministry of Works in Nanjing
1409	January	Orders are issued for the third voyage
1409	15 February	The Galle Trilingual Inscription is produced
1409		Treasure fleet makes the return voyage and stops at the Similan Islands to cut logs for incense
1409	summer	Treasure fleet returns to China
1409	October	Zheng He departs with 27,000 men, taking the usual route

== 1410s ==
Year	Date	Event
1410		Ming–Kotte War: Treasure fleet lands at Galle in Ceylon and captures King Vijayabahu VI of the Kingdom of Gampola
1411	6 July	Treasure fleet returns to Nanjing
1412	18 December	Yongle Emperor issues orders for the fourth voyage
1413	autumn	Zheng He departs from Nanjing and takes the usual route with the addition of 4 new destinations: the Maldives, Bitra, Chetlat Island, and Hormuz, which is given the following description: "Foreign ships from every place, together with foreign merchants traveling by land, all come to this territory in order to gather together and buy and sell, and therefore the people of this country are all rich"
1415		Treasure fleet captures Sekandar, a rebel against Zain al-'Abidin, king of the Samudera Pasai Sultanate
1415	12 August	Treasure fleet arrives back in Nanjing
1415	13 August	Zheng He's colleague is sent on a mission bearing gifts to Bengal
1416	19 November	Yongle Emperor bestows gifts upon ambassadors from 18 countries
1416	19 December	Yongle Emperor issues orders for the fifth voyage
1417	autumn	Zheng He departs China taking the previous route to Hormuz, and then Aden, Mogadishu, Barawa, Zhubu, and Malindi
1419	8 August	Treasure fleet returns to China
1419	20 September	Ambassadors present exotic animals to the Ming court including a giraffe imported from Somalia by Bengalis
1419	2 October	Orders are issued for the construction of 41 treasure ships

== 1420s ==
Year	Date	Event
1421	3 March	Orders are issued for the sixth voyage and envoys from 16 countries including Hormuz are given gifts of paper and coin money, and ceremonial robes and linings
1421	14 May	Yongle Emperor orders the suspension of the treasure voyages
1421	10 November	Orders are issued to Zheng He to provide Hong Bao and envoys from 16 countries passage back to their countries; the treasure fleet takes its usual route to Ceylon where it splits up and heads for the Maldives, Hormuz, and the Arabian states of Djofar, Lasa, and Aden, and the two African states of Mogadishu and Barawa; Zheng He visits Ganbali
1422		Treasure fleet regroups at Samudera Pasai Sultanate and visit Siam before heading back to China
1422	3 September	Treasure fleet returns to China bringing envoys from Siam, Samudera Pasai Sultanate, and Aden
1424	27 February	Zheng He is sent on a diplomatic mission to Palembang to confer "a gauze cap, a ceremonial robe with floral gold woven into gold patterns in the silk, and a silver seal" on Shi Jinqing's son Shi Jisun
1424	12 August	Yongle Emperor dies
1424	7 September	Zhu Gaozhi becomes Hongxi Emperor and terminates the treasure voyages
1425	29 May	Hongxi Emperor dies
1425	27 June	Zhu Zhanji becomes Xuande Emperor
1428	25 March	Xuande Emperor orders Zheng He to supervise the reconstruction of the Great Baoen Temple

== 1430s ==
Year	Date	Event
1430	25 May	Arrangements are made for the provisions of another voyage
1430	29 June	Xuande Emperor issues orders for the seventh voyage
1431	19 January	Treasure fleet departs from Nanjing
1431	23 January	The fleet stops at an island on the Yangtze to hunt animals
1431	3 February	Treasure fleet arrives at Liujiagang
1431	14 March	Liujiagang Inscription is erected
1431	8 April	Treasure fleet arrives at Changle
1431	December	The Changle Inscription is erected and the fleet departs from Changle
1431	16 December	Treasure fleet arrives near Fuzhou
1432	27 January	Treasure fleet arrives at Vijaya
1432	12 February	Treasure fleet departs from Vijaya
1432	7 March	Treasure fleet arrives at Surabaya
1432	13 July	Treasure fleet departs from Surabaya
1432	24 July	Treasure fleet arrives at Palembang
1432	27 July	Treasure fleet departs from Palembang
1432	3 August	Treasure fleet arrives at Malacca
1432	2 September	Treasure fleet departs from Malacca
1432	12 September	Treasure fleet arrives at Samudera Pasai Sultanate and Hong Bao and Ma Huan detach from the fleet to visit Bengal
1432	2 November	Treasure fleet departs from Samudera Pasai Sultanate
1432	14 November	Treasure fleet anchors at Great Nicobar Island for three days; the natives there trade coconuts in log boats
1432	28 November	Treasure fleet arrives at Beruwala
1432	2 December	Treasure fleet departs from Beruwala
1432	10 December	Treasure fleet arrives at Calicut
1432	14 December	Treasure fleet departs from Calicut
1433		Zheng He dies
1433		Hong Bao and Ma Huan arrive in Calicut and send seven men to Mecca while Hong Bao visits Djofar, Lasa, Aden, Mogadishu, and Barawa before heading back to China
1433	17 January	Treasure fleet arrives at Hormuz
1433	9 March	Treasure fleet departs from Hormuz and heads back to China
1433	31 March	Treasure fleet arrives at Calicut
1433	9 April	Treasure fleet departs from Calicut
1433	25 April	Treasure fleet arrives at Samudera Pasai Sultanate
1433	1 May	Treasure fleet departs from Samudera Pasai Sultanate
1433	9 May	Treasure fleet arrives at Malacca
1433	13 June	Treasure fleet arrives at Vijaya
1433	17 June	Treasure fleet departs from Vijaya
1433	7 July	Treasure fleet arrives in China
1433	14 September	Envoys from Samudera Pasai Sultanate, Calicut, Cochin, Ceylon, Djofar, Aden, Coimbatore, Hormuz, Kayal, and Mecca present tribute
1433		Ma Huan publishes his Yingya Shenglan
1434		Gong Zhen publishes his Xiyang Fanguo Zhi
1436		Ming dynasty bans building seagoing ships
1436		Fei Xin publishes his Xingcha Shenglan

== 1440s ==
Year	Date	Event
c. 1440		The Old Port Pacification Superintendency at Palembang is reabsorbed by the Majapahit.

== 1460s ==
Year	Date	Event
1464		Documents of the treasure voyages are removed from the archives of the Ministry of War and destroyed by Liu Daxia on the basis that they were "deceitful exaggerations of bizarre things far removed from the testimony of people's ears and eyes," and that "the expeditions of Sanbao to the Western Ocean wasted tens of myriads of money and grain, and moreover the people who met their deaths [on these expeditions] may be counted in the myriads. Although he returned with wonderful precious things, what benefit was it to the state? This was merely an action of bad government of which ministers should severely disapprove. Even if the old archives were still preserved they should be destroyed in order to suppress [a repetition of these things] at the root."

== Bibliography ==
- Church, Sally K. (2005), Zheng He: An Investigation into the Plausibility of 450-ft Treasure Ships, Monumenta Serica Institute
- Dreyer, Edward L. (2007), Zheng He: China and the Oceans in the Early Ming Dynasty, 1405-1433, Pearson Longman
- Duyvendak, J.J.L. (1938), "The True Dates of the Chinese Maritime Expeditions in the Early Fifteenth Century", T'oung Pao, 34 (5): 341–413, doi:10.1163/156853238X00171
- Levathes, Louise (1996), When China Ruled the Seas: The Treasure Fleet of the Dragon Throne 1405-1433, Simon & Schuster
- Mills, J.V.G. (1970), Ying-yai Sheng-lan: 'The Overall Survey of the Ocean's Shores' [1433], Cambridge: Cambridge University Press
- Needham, Joseph (1971), Science and Civilization in China Volume 4 Part 3, Cambridge At The University Press
