= Zheng He Xia Xiyang (TV series) =

Chinese television series

- Promotional poster
- Also known as: The Great Voyage; The Great Navigator: Zheng He
- 郑和下西洋
- Genre: Historical drama
- Screenplay by: Zhu Sujin
- Directed by: Ma Xiao
- Presented by: Zhu Tong; Wu Longhai
- Starring: Gallen Lo; Tang Guoqiang; Yu Xiaohui; Du Yulu
- Composer: Luo Xiaojian
- Country of origin: China
- Original language: Mandarin
- No. of episodes: 59

Production
- Executive producers: Fu Si; Zhou Li
- Producers: Li Dandan; Huang Haitao
- Production location: China
- Cinematography: Qiang Jun; Wang Tao; Li Tian
- Editor: Hong Mei
- Running time: ≈45 minutes per episode
- Production company: CCTV

Original release
- Network: CCTV-8

Zheng He Xia Xiyang (郑和下西洋; literally Zheng He sails the western ocean), also known as The Great Voyage and The Great Navigator: Zheng He, is a Chinese historical television series based on the life of Zheng He, the explorer who led seven expeditions to Southeast Asia, South Asia, and East Africa in the 15th century. Starring Gallen Lo as Zheng He, the series was first shown on CCTV-8 in mainland China in 2009.

== Synopsis ==
During the early Ming dynasty, a young Ma He is taken from Yunnan, castrated, and assigned as an attendant to Zhu Di, the Prince of Yan. While serving Zhu Di in Beiping near the Ming Empire's northern frontier, Ma He develops his military and diplomatic skills. Zhu Di, after being influenced by the Buddhist monk Yao Guangxiao, adopts a more outward-looking vision compared to his father the Hongwu Emperor, who has imposed maritime restrictions.

After the Hongwu Emperor's death, tensions rise between Zhu Di and his nephew Zhu Yunwen, who has become the new emperor and aims to reduce the princes' power. Initially forced to feign madness to avoid trouble, Zhu Di later starts a civil war to seize the throne for himself. Ma He proves his mettle during the war, becoming one of Zhu Di's most trusted aides after saving the prince's life in one battle. Zhu Di ultimately wins the power struggle, takes control of the capital Nanjing and declares himself emperor with the regnal name "Yongle". He grants Ma He a new family name "Zheng" and puts him in charge of a large fleet of treasure ships.

Zheng He leads over 27,000 men on the first of several expeditions across Southeast Asia and the Indian Ocean, promoting trade, establishing diplomatic relations, and extending Chinese influence abroad. During his first expedition, Zheng He defeats Chen Zuyi's pirates, who have disrupted maritime trade in Southeast Asia. His fleet visits Champa, Java, Sumatra, Ceylon, Calicut, Palembang, and other places, building relations with local rulers and trading Chinese porcelain, silk and tea for foreign goods.

The Yongle Emperor supports the expeditions by expanding shipbuilding and export production throughout China. At the same time, he initiates other grand projects such as the compilation of the Yongle Encyclopedia, the restoration of the Grand Canal, and the construction of a new capital.

Zheng He is ordered to conduct foreign relations through diplomacy rather than force. His fleet establishes trading centres in Malacca and Hormuz, developing commercial links with Arab, Persian and European merchants. In Ceylon, when the ruler Vira Alakesvara attempts to capture and plunder the fleet, Zheng He defeats him in battle and takes him back to China as a prisoner. Instead of executing Alakeshvara, the Yongle Emperor pardons him as a sign of magnanimity.

As Zheng He's voyages take him further west, opposition foments in the Ming government. Some officials argue that the expeditions are extravagant, accusing Zheng He of corruption, raising a private army, and pursuing his personal goals overseas. After lightning strikes destroy parts of the newly built Forbidden City, the emperor sees it as a sign of divine disapproval of the voyages and grows suspicious of Zheng He. However, Yao Guangxiao and foreign envoys speak up for Zheng He, pointing out the diplomatic and commercial successes of the voyages. Zheng He is then reinstated and ordered to lead further voyages to Arabia and East Africa.

Meanwhile, the Yongle Emperor continues leading campaigns against the Mongols in the north and eventually succumbs to illness on the way back to Beijing. When Zheng He returns to China, the Yongle Emperor's successor, the Hongxi Emperor, restores the maritime restrictions and cancels the voyages. Zheng He is sent to Nanjing and instructed to construct the Great Bao'en Temple. The knowledge he gained from his voyages is destroyed and most of the fleet is dismantled, and he is denounced for causing great damage to the Ming Empire. Zheng He sinks into despair and contemplates suicide.

The Hongxi Emperor dies shortly after and is succeeded by his son, the Xuande Emperor, who sees the value of diplomatic relations, overseas trade and maritime security. The new emperor recalls an ageing Zheng He, ordering him and Wang Jinghong to rebuild the fleet and resume the voyages.

Zheng He departs on his seventh voyage with about 27,000 men, visiting over 20 states, restoring diplomatic ties, and renewing trade across the Indian Ocean. As his health declines, he divides the fleet into separate squadrons so that his deputies can visit more locations.

Determined to reach Europe by sea, Zheng He leads the main fleet southwards in an attempt to pass the Cape of Good Hope. However, before he reaches his destination, he is ordered to return to China. Exhausted and critically ill, Zheng He eventually dies during the return voyage.

== Cast ==
- Gallen Lo as Zheng He
- Tang Guoqiang as Zhu Di, the Yongle Emperor
- Yu Xiaohui as Empress Xu
- Du Yulu as Yao Guangxiao
- Theresa Lee as Shana'er
- Yu Xiaoxue as Song Lianxin
- Sun Qiang as Wu Xuan
- Yan Hongzhi as Zhang Yu
- Li Daguang as Wang Jinghong
- Bai Yujuan as Xu Miaojin
- Dong Ziwu as Nan Xuangong
- Jiang Changyi as Xie Jin
- Hou Xiangling as Chen Zuyi
- Zhang Jie as Zhu Gaochi, the Hongxi Emperor
- Xie Zhenwei as Zhu Zhanji, the Xuande Emperor
- Li Qi as Zhu Quan
- Zhang Hao as Xia Yuanji
- Yang Fan as Zhu Gaoxu
- Qian Xueming as Fang Xiaoru
- Lü Yiding as Shi Jinqing
- Ma Jun as Tie Ping
- Zhang Yushan as Qi Tai
- Liu Haitao as Zhu Neng
- Lan Danuo as Zhu Yunwen, the Jianwen Emperor
- Jia Wei as Qiu Fu
- Dong Danjun as Qiu Guangde
- Gang Limin as Hu Cheng
- Lin Jian as Song Tian
- Ma Tingjun as Liu Ruming
- Chen Weirong as Vira Alakesvara of Gampola
- Du Jian as Prince Mana of Brunei

== Production ==
The series was specially produced to mark the 600th anniversary of Zheng He's voyages. Shooting for the series started on 30 September 2005 in Hengdian World Studios, Zhejiang.

== International broadcasts ==
Country	Network(s)/Station(s)	Series premiere	Title
China	CCTV-8	2009 - 2009 ()	郑和下西洋 (电视剧) (Zheng He Xia Xiyang (2009); lit: )
Singapore	Channel 8	January 1, 2011 - May 21, 2011 (Weekend evening 22:30-00:30 (broadcast time 22:30-01:30 on May 21, 2011))	郑和下西洋 (电视剧) (Zheng He Xia Xiyang (2009); lit: )
Thailand	NationTV22	April 22, 2017 – September 14, 2017 (Every Monday to Friday from 14:00 - 15:00)	ซำปอกง (Zheng He Sails The Western Ocean (2009); lit: )
Thailand	NEW18	April 10, 2020 – August 21, 2020 (Every Friday, Saturday and Sunday)	ซำปอกง ( Zheng He Sails The Western Ocean (2009); lit: )
