= Rumah ulu =

Traditional Indonesian house design

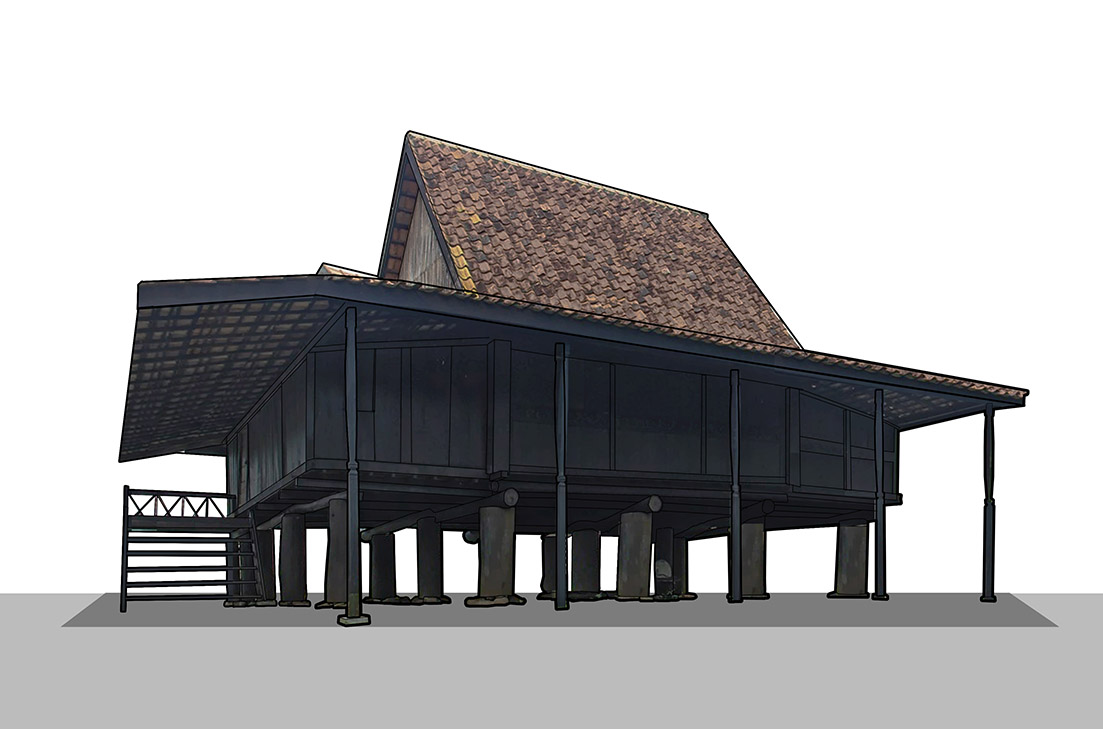
A sketch of the rumah Ulu of the Uluan people of South Sumatra displayed in the Balaputradeva Museum.

Rumah ulu is a vernacular house found in the highlands of South Sumatra, Indonesia. The house is associated with the Uluan people, who reside in the region upstream of the Ogan and Musi rivers.

== Distribution ==
Rumah ulu is a traditional house of people living upstream of Musi River, South Sumatra. The name ulu is derived from the word uluan, which means "upstream". The term is also used as a generalization for rural inhabitants of the mountain range of Central Bukit Barisan upstream of the River. The current province of South Sumatra encompasses only a small part of the former administrative region of South Sumatra (the present Sumbagsel or Southern Region of Sumatra), consisting of the provinces of Bengkulu, Jambi, Lampung, and South Sumatra proper (the former Palembang Sultanate).

With modernity, less and less rumah ulu can be found in the hinterland. No new ulu house have been constructed since the 1920s. A 200 years old ulu house is kept in the Balaputradeva Museum. The rumah ulu in the museum was taken from Asamkelat Village in Pengandonan Subdistrict of Ogan Komering Ulu Regency. A couple of old and large rumah ulu can still be found near Baturaja, although without conservation status, these too may be destroyed.

== Architecture ==
Rumah ulu evolved from an older type of houses known as the rumah uluan, the most basic form of rumah ulu. Rumah uluan is basically a type of wooden stage house, typical vernacular architecture in the Nusantara archipelago.

Rumah uluan was built over very thick wooden posts (tiang duduk/kong), usually numbered six to nine. The posts are about 1.5 metres (4.9 ft) high. A strong hardwood e.g. ulin is used for the posts. The posts are not sunk into the ground, but stand over a flat river stone.

The proper house (dalam) has a square layout. Construction method for the house involves placing a complete frame of the house on top of the posts. The layout is simple, with space divided into two different levels by a 15 centimetres (5.9 in)-high dividing beam (sengkar). The lower area (tempuan), about two-thirds of the total floor area, is where the entrance is located. The lower space is used to prepare and to consume food, with the hearth placed in one corner. In a larger house, the kitchen is located in an additional building known as the beruge. The higher one-third floor area (luan) marks the more private sleeping area. This higher area is also used as the place where elders, or members of the bridge-giving lineage, were seated. The word luan means "stern" of a boat.

Rumah uluan's roof is characterized with projecting gables and rafters which rest on flying roof plates. The construction technique is similar with the Toba Batak houses.

The degree of decorations indicates the wealth of the house owners. Relief carvings (tatahan) are found in places e.g. on the studs and beams of the frame. Frequent motifs are floral e.g., bunge bulan (moonflower) or kembang matahari (sunflower), usually carved on door and the outside of the luan wall.

== Interior ==
The interior of rumah ulu is divided into three parts namely the front room, the middle room, and the back room. These three spaces are further divided into rooms e.g. the living room (garang or lintut); the resting room (haluan/luan and kakudan); the elder room (ruang gedongan or ambin), and ruangan dapur (kitchen).

The living room (garang or lintut) is the place where the homeowner can have a chat in the afternoon after doing a work routine. The resting room is divided into a male resting space (haluan) and a female resting space (kakudan). The elder room (ruang gedongan or ambin) is the most central part of the rumah ulu and is located on the highest platform in the house. This room is used for the eldest of the family to give counsel or share wisdom in the form of stories to the children and the grandchildren.

== Ulu village ==
The hierarchy of space of the uluan is defined by a rule known as the ulu-ulak (ilir) system. In village organization, if a new younger member of the family is planning to build a new house, the house must always be situated on the downstream side of the older house. This results in a clear village organization where the oldest house in the village is always located on the upstream side.

== See also ==
- Rumah adat
- Rumah limas
- Rumah gadang

== Cited works ==
- Ahmad Ibo (2017). "Rumah Ulu Sumatera Selatan dari Ogan Komering Ulu". Indonesia Kaya. Indonesia Kaya.
- Barendregt, Bart (2004). Schefold, Reimar; Nas, Peter J.M.; Domenig, Gaudenz (eds.). Architecture on the move: Processes of migration and mobility in the South Sumatran highlands - Indonesian Houses: Tradition and Transformation in Vernacular Architecture. Leiden Series on Indonesian Architecture. Vol. 1. Singapore: Singapore University Press. ISBN 9789971692926.
- Sukanti; Zulbiati; Emawati (1993). Rumah Ulu Sumatera Selatan. Jakarta: Balai Pustaka.
