= Sunan Giri Mosque =

Mosque in Gresik, East Java, Indonesia

- Masjid Sunan Giri
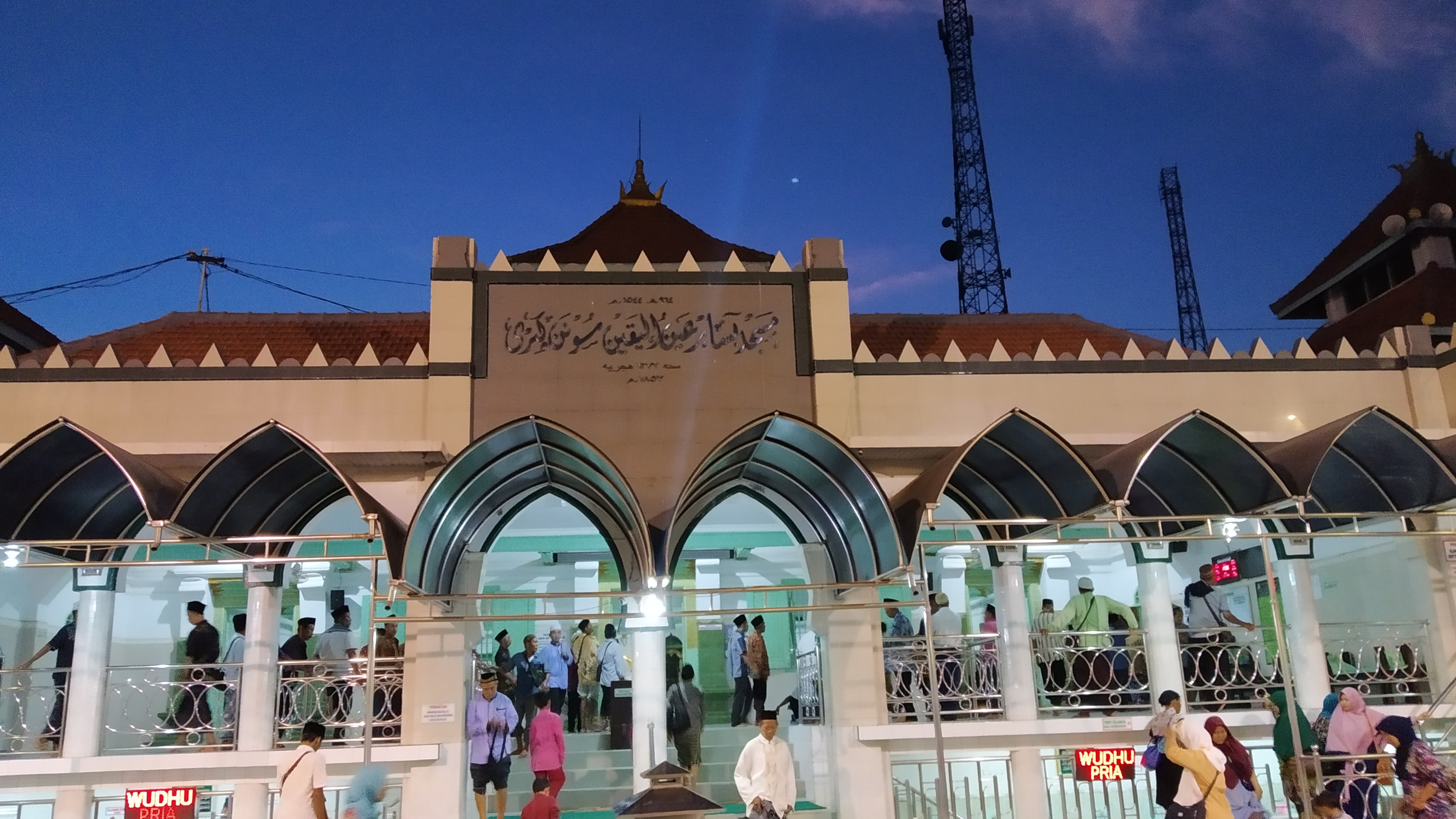

Religion
- Affiliation: Islam
- Branch/tradition: Sunni

Location
- State: East Java
- Country: Indonesia

Architecture
- Type: Mosque architecture
- Style: Islamic architecture

Sunan Giri Mosque (Indonesian: Masjid Sunan Giri) is located near Gresik, about 45 kilometres from Surabaya, Indonesia. Its pavilion shelters the tomb of Sunan Giri, one of the nine Muslim saints of Java (see Wali Sanga), and like the tombs of the other wali sanga, it is a significant and highly auspicious pilgrimage point. This site is often referred to as Giri Kedaton.

The site also hosts various family members from Sunan Giri, such as his foster mother, wives, and sons.

It is believed that this is the location of the Giri Kedaton Kingdom which was founded by Sunan Giri on March 9, 1487. As its wood carvings are thought to date back 500 years and are well preserved, retaining the original gold and red lacquer colour scheme.

This site is located on the top of Giri hill with a steep uphill, precisely at Sidomukti Village, parts of Kebomas Sub-district of Gresik Regency, about 200 m south from Sunan Giri graveyard.

== Etymology ==
Giri Kedaton comes from the word Datu which means King. The word datu undergoes a vowel change when heard and mentioned by the residents. This changes the word datu to Kedatuan or Kedaton. While the meaning of the word kedaton itself has a meaning as the place of the king . This place used to be the throne of kings from the descendants of Sunan Giri, a boarding school education place, a community meeting place (in the first step area), until eventually it became a royal family burial complex.

== Location ==
The mosque, which is located at an altitude of 120 meters above sea level, still preserves the concept of the building of the Astana Giri Kedaton Kingdom. To the south of the northern gate, there is a tomb complex for Sunan Prapen and his family. The burial complex of Sunan Prapen, the fourth king of Giri Kedaton Kingdom and his family is located nearby from the Sunan Giri Mosque. The fourth king of Giri Kedaton Kingdom was a descendant of Sunan Giri who had the most success in bringing the kingdom and spreading Islam in the eastern part of Java.

== History ==
The Sunan Giri Mosque is located on the hillside of the Sidomukti Village, Kebomas District, Gresik Regency, is the place where Sunan Giri founded the Yellow Book Study Center.

Currently, the Sunan Giri Mosque that is not the original mosque built by Sunan Giri. The mosque that was originally built was made of wood. Meanwhile, we see that today it has been made and a permanent concrete wall. However, the architectural form is close to that of the old mosque (original) which was founded by Sunan Giri in 1544. Due to the times and the condition of the mosque which was deteriorating, in 1857, when the mosque was around 313 years old, the first renovation or repair was carried out. Henceforth, it is not recorded how many renovations have been carried out.

As a historical relic, this mosque was operated by the Dutch East Indies government. The mosque was registered in "monumenten ordonantie" with staat number 238 blaad in 1931. Currently, it is under the supervision of the Directorate of Protection and Development of Historical and Archaeological Heritage of The Ministry of Education and Culture (Depdikbud).

The most recent was renovation was carried out in 1982. The inauguration was carried out by the Regent of KDH Level II Gresik on December 17, 1982.

Even though it is a historical heritage, it is still used as a house of worship. The mosque is still busy with worshipers for rawatib prayers (five daily prayers) and Friday prayers, even during big months, such as Muharram, Dzulhijjah, and Rabiʽ al-Awwal (maulid). The mosque is also visited with pilgrims from outside Java, such as Sumatra and Kalimantan.

== Architecture ==
Entering the location of the mosque, there are about six headstone located on the left and right of the gate. Grave stones are also located on the side of the stairs leading to the mosque. Meanwhile, the main tomb where Sunan Giri was buried is located in the area to the left of the mosque. There are around 300 graves located around the Sunan Giri Mosque. The shape of the headstone is almost the same and anonymous. Made from black stone 'stone, black' which was widely used to make temples or statues in the heyday of Hinduism and Buddhism.

As is common with old mosques throughout the region, the Sunan Giri mosque also has a distinctive dome shape, namely a pyramid roof dome with three steps. The shape of the dome like this reminds us of the dome of the Demak Mosque as the first mosque built by the guardians in Java. It is not surprising, because there is indeed a relationship between Demak Sultanate and Sunan Giri.

Sunan Giri Mosque has three levels of geographical steps. The first step is the hallway where the teaching and learning activities of Islamic religious education are taking place. In addition, this veranda is also used by residents for activities and worship. The second step is the family burial ground on the west side. However, on the east side there are minarets, gates, and mosques which in the past were used to say the call to prayer (call to worship).

The close family of Sunan Giri, consisting of the children and wives of Sunan Giri is on the third step. In the second circle of steps, were buried the bodies of Sunan Giri's close relatives, siblings and foster siblings. Besides that, outside the fence there is a grave of Sunan Prapen or the birth name of Mas Ratu Pratikal and his family's grave

== See also ==
- Timeline of Islamic history
- Indonesian architecture
- Mosque in Indonesia
