= Great Mosque of Palembang =

Mosque in Palembang, South Sumatra, Indonesia

- Masjid Agung Palembang
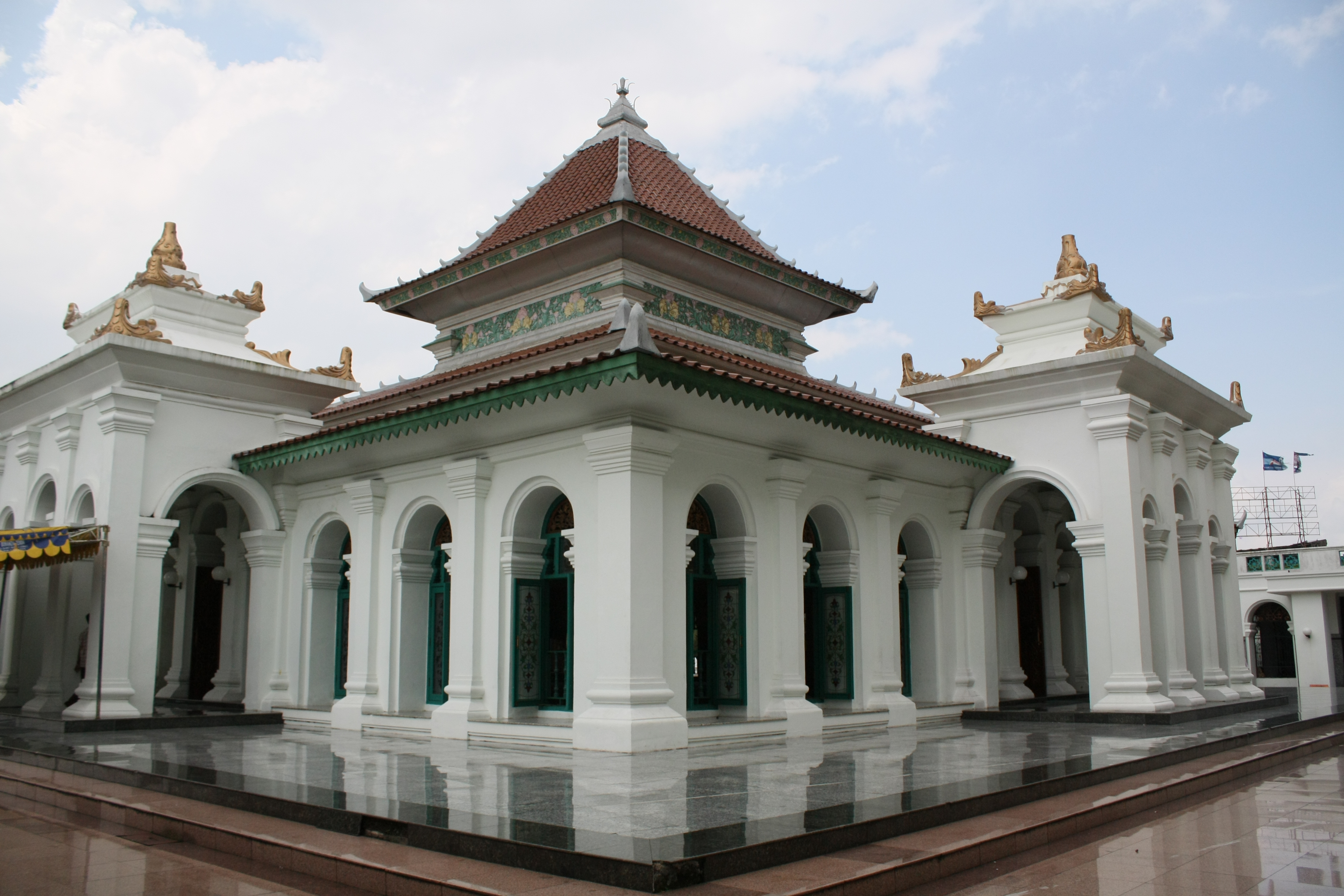

Religion
- Affiliation: Islam
- Branch/tradition: Sunni
- Province: South Sumatra
- Status: Active

Location
- Location: Palembang, Indonesia
- Interactive map of Great Mosque of Palembang
- Coordinates: 2.987949°S 104.760277°E

Architecture
- Type: Mosque

Specifications
- Direction of façade: East
- Minaret: 2
- Minaret height: 20 metres (66 ft); 45 metres (148 ft)

The Great Mosque of Palembang (Indonesian Masjid Agung Palembang), also known as Sultan Mahmud Badaruddin I Great Mosque after the former Sultan of Palembang, is the main mosque of Palembang, the capital of South Sumatra. The mosque is the largest in South Sumatra, and the third largest mosque in Sumatra after the Grand Mosque of West Sumatra and Great Mosque of Pekanbaru.

== History ==
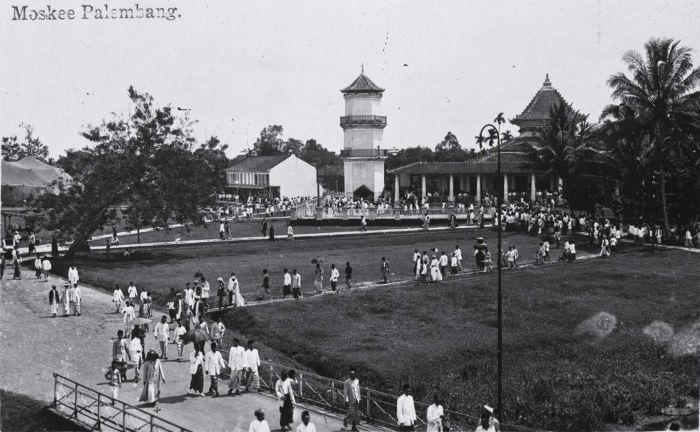
People around the ground of the Great Mosque.

The original mosque of Palembang was a royal mosque located within the kraton (palace) complex of Kuto Gawang and was built by Sultan Ki Gede Ing Suro. After the destruction of this mosque in 1659 by Admiral Johan van der Laen of the VOC, the Sultanate of Palembang, under the reign of Sultan Mahmud Badaruddin I Jaya Wikrama, decided to build a new mosque. Construction started on Hijri 1 Jumadil Akhir ah 1151 (1738 CE) beside the Kraton Tengkuruk, also known as Kuto Kecik.

Construction of the mosque took 10 years because of disturbances caused by tension with the Dutch. The mosque was only completed on 28 Jumadil Awwal ah 1161 (1748 CE). This new mosque, named the Sultan Mosque, was built in a typical Javanese mosque architecture, featuring a multi-tiered roof supported by four main posts and topped with a mustaka (roof top ornament). The roof also features a sweeping curvature that rises at the corners of the roof which may be influenced with Chinese architecture, although now it is commonly accepted to be directly influenced by the vernacular limas roof. At the time of its completion, the Sultan Mosque was believed to be the largest in Indonesia, even in Southeast Asia., having the capacity to accommodate 1,200 worshippers.

The first minaret's construction started in 1748 and was completed in 1812, being similarly delayed because of another conflict with the Dutch. This minaret is a 20-meter white brick tower, with a hexagonal layout, and topped with a clay tile roof that resembles the roof of a Chinese pagoda. In that same year, a 12 x 18 square meter extension was added to the mosque, expanding its capacity to 2,300 worshippers.

Further conflict with the Dutch caused destruction of the minaret, however in 1823, after the abolition of the sultanate, the mosque was renovated by the Dutch in an attempt at conciliation, with the destroyed clay tile roof of the minaret being replaced with shingle roof in 1825.

In 1848, the Sultan Mosque was considerably expanded by the Dutch Colonial government. The traditional styled main entrance was replaced by neoclassical porticoes with Doric-styled columns. Further expansion occurred in 1879, with the addition of a porch supported by a cylindrical concrete column.

In 1897, some lands around the mosque were acquired to expand the mosque complex. At this time, the mosque received its current name, the Masjid Agung or "Great Mosque" of Palembang.

In 1916, the minaret building was restored; In 1930, the pillar columns of the mosque was raised, adding its height to 4 meter.

Between 1966 and 1969, the Great Mosque of Palembang received another major expansion with the addition of second floors, expanding the area of the mosque to 5,520 square meter which enabled the mosque to accommodate 7,750 people. A new 45 meter high Ottoman-styled minaret was added to the mosque on January 22, 1970; its construction was sponsored by Pertamina. The mosque also received a Middle-East styled dome. The original roof form was not demolished, however, the overall profile of the mosque changed dramatically.

The last major renovation of the mosque occurred in 2000 when the original architectural language of the mosque was restored. The mosque was completed on June 16, 2003 and was officially inaugurated by President Megawati Sukarnoputri. The mosque is now able to accommodate 9,000 people, and during the Friday prayer, when the field in the mosque complex is used, congregations inside the mosque complex can reach 15,000 people.

=== Conflict over the Lawang Kidul Mosque ===
In 1893, Masagus H. Abdulhamid, a businessman who had made fortune in wood and forest products, decided to build two new mosques in Palembang: the Muara Ogan Mosque on the estuary of the Ogan River, and the Lawang Kidul Mosque (which was originally a simple prayer space) located in administrative district 5 Ilir. Being strategically located near the harbor, Lawang Kidul Mosque soon became a gathering point for those who went on the hajj to Mecca. The religious elite based in the Sultan Mosque saw the success of Lawang Kidul Mosque as a threat to the existing balance of power and demanded it to be closed. At one point the intervention of the Advisor on Native Affairs, Snouck Hurgronje, was even sought. On the basis of one-sided information, Hurgronje issued an order to close Lawang Kidul Mosque at the end of 1893. It was only after the retirement of Hurgronje in 1906 that Lawang Kidul Mosque was reopened. The decision was not met with resistance by the religious elite because by that time the Sultan Mosque was no longer able to contain all its worshippers.

== Architecture ==
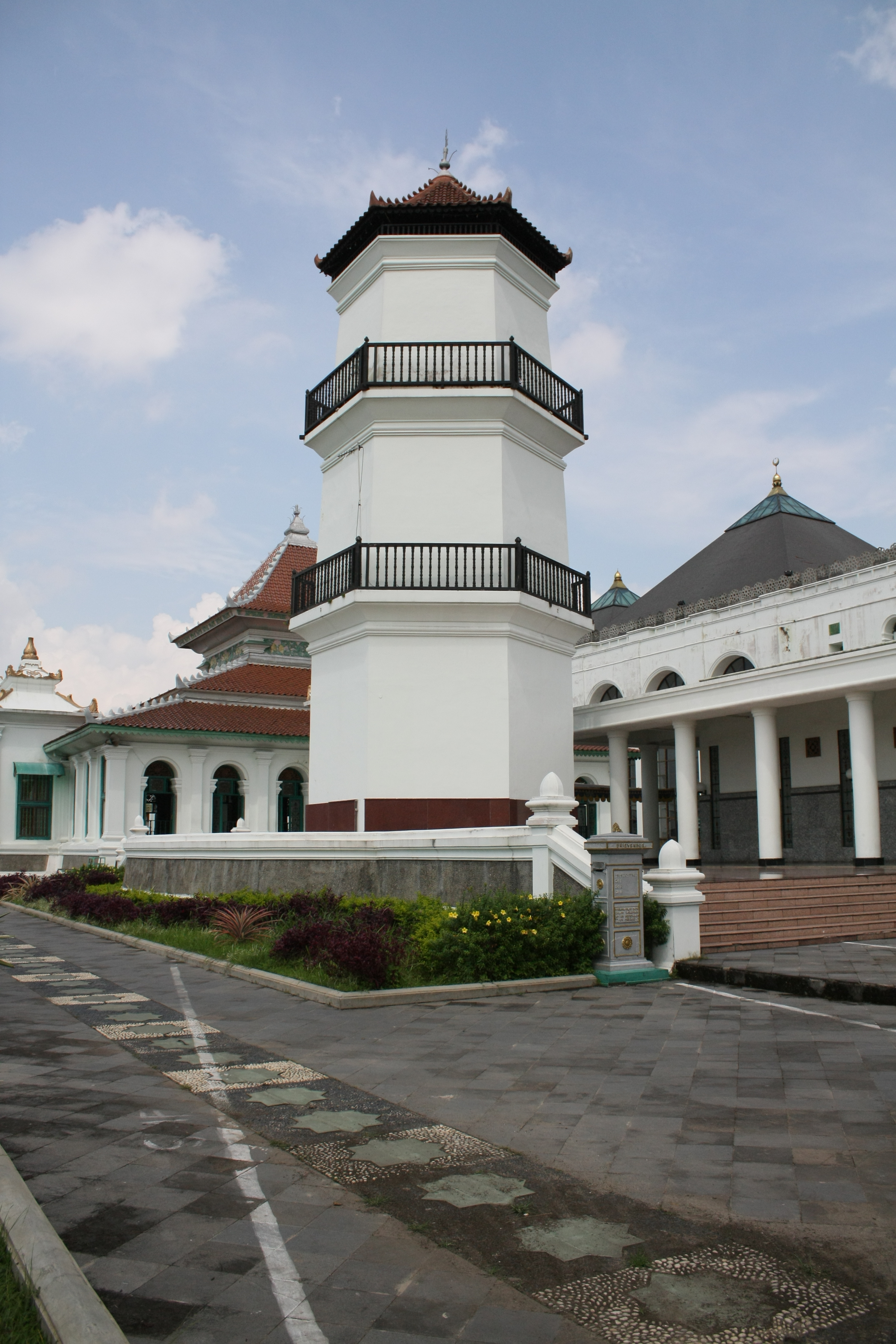
The restored 18th-century minaret of the Great Mosque.

The Great Mosque of Palembang features a green three-tiered roof, a typical mosque architecture in Indonesia. The roof form displays a strong Chinese influences, though they are now generally considered to be directly related with the traditional limas (pyramidal) roof.

The Great Mosque of Palembang has two minarets, which is an unusual feature in Indonesian mosque architecture. The newer Ottoman-styled minaret is 45 meter high with 12 sides. The older 18th-century minaret shows influence from Chinese architecture.

During Ramadan, the grounds in front of it are turned into a market.

== See also ==
- List of mosques in Indonesia

== Works cited ==
- Acep Iwan (November 7, 2012). "Sejarah Berdirinya Masjid Agung Palembang" [History of the establishment of the Great Mosque of Palembang]. Pelajaran Dunia Sang Muslim (in Indonesian). Blogspot. Archived from the original on November 12, 2015.
- Ardhani Reswari (December 22, 2013). "Sejarah Masjid Agung Palembang" [History of the Great Mosque of Palembang]. Kompasiana (in Indonesian). Kompasiana. Archived from the original on November 9, 2015.
- Taal, Sandra (2002). Nas, Peter J.M. (ed.). Cultural expressions, collective memory and the urban landscape in Palembang - The Indonesian Town Revisited. Southeast Asian Dynamics. Vol. 1. Münster: LIT Verlag. ISBN 9783825860387.
- Zein, Abdul Baqir (1999). Masjid-masjid bersejarah di Indonesia [Historic mosques in Indonesia] (in Indonesian). Jakarta: Gema Insani. ISBN 9789795615675.
