= Balaputradeva Museum =

State Museum of South Sumatra Province Balaputradeva
- Museum Negeri Balaputera Dewa / Museum Provinsi Sumatera Selatan
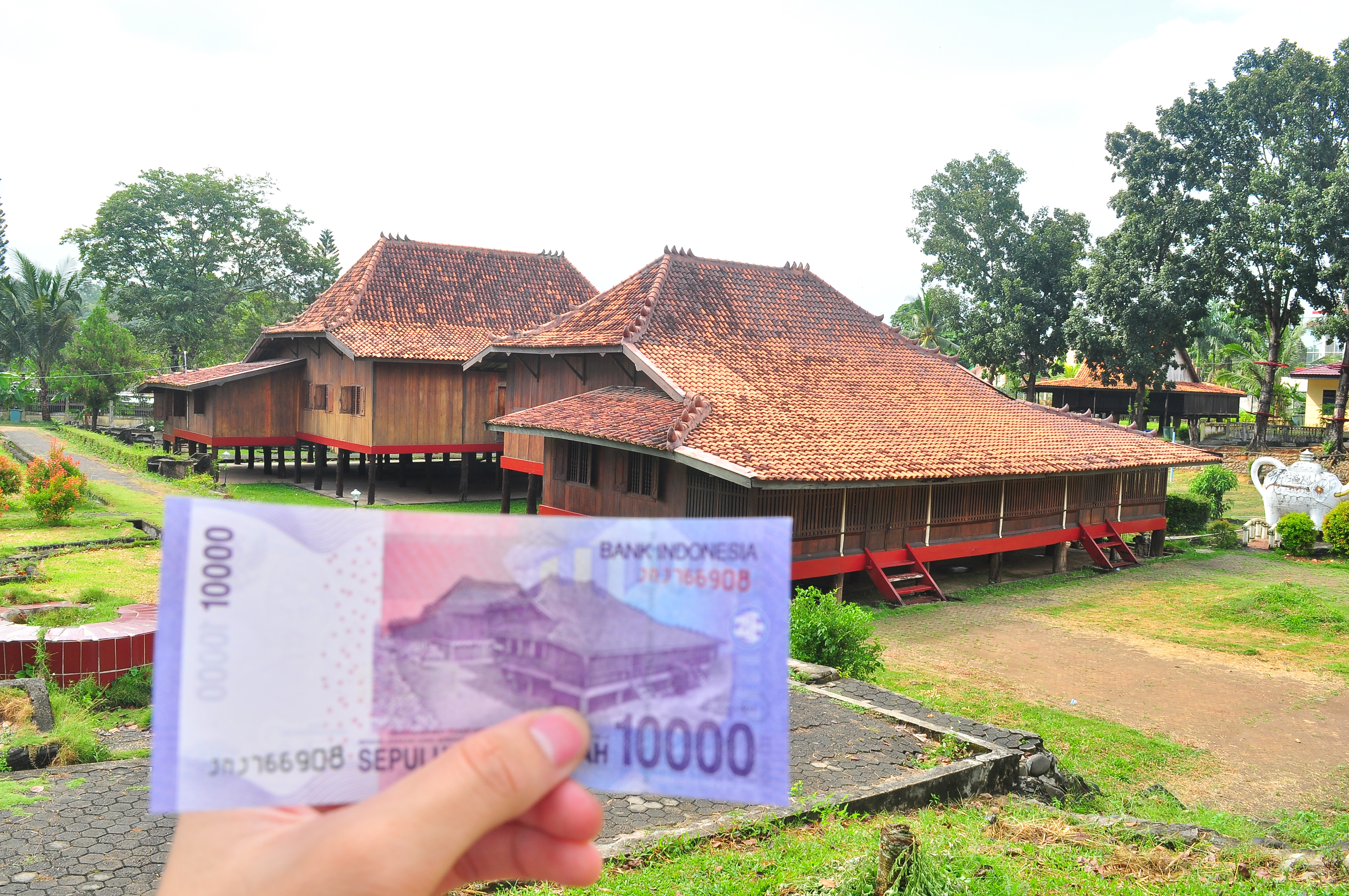
- An authentic limas house located in the Balaputra Dewa Museum
- Established: 5 November 1984
- Location: Jalan Srijaya I No 28, Palembang, South Sumatra
- Coordinates: 2°57′03″S 104°43′50″E
- Type: Provincial museum
- Collection size: 3,882
- Owner: Government of South Sumatra Province

Balaputradeva Museum (Indonesian Museum Balaputera Dewa), officially the State Museum of South Sumatra Province "Balaputradeva", is an ethnographic museum located in Southern Sumatra's capital Palembang. The museum is the state museum of the Province of South Sumatra. The name Balaputradeva is derived from Balaputra, a 9th century sovereign of Srivijaya kingdom and the former head of the Sailendra dynasty whose main center was located in the vicinity of Palembang. Balaputradeva Museum displays the history and traditions of the province of South Sumatra.

== Description ==
Balaputradeva Museum is one of the so-called State Museums of Indonesia, representing each province in Indonesia. Construction of the museum started in 1978 and the building was inaugurated on 5 November 1984. The decision to name it "Balaputradeva" is based on the 9th century Indian sovereign Balaputra who was recorded in an inscription discovered in Nalanda, India. The Nalanda inscription mentions his connection with the building of a Buddhist monastery under his sponsorship. The second mention of his name is found in a 9th-century Javanese inscription which relates his defeat in Java to Rakai Pikatan, a ruler of the Sanjaya dynasty, which prompted Balaputra to leave Java to settle in what is now Palembang, South Sumatra.

== Collection ==
Balaputradeva Museum houses traditional crafts and artifacts discovered in the Province of South Sumatra, from the prehistoric era to the Dutch colonial period. The collection is showcased in three main exhibition rooms described below. Balaputradeva State Museum is one of the three local public collections of Sriwijayan artifacts, the other is the Sultan Mahmud Badaruddin II Museum and the Sriwijaya Kingdom Archaeological Park.

=== Megalith section ===
The megalithic culture in South Sumatra was centered in the highlands of Pagaralam, in the Barisan Mountains on the west side of South Sumatra. In the highlands, 22 megalithic culture sites were discovered. Some examples of artifacts displayed in this section are megalithic statues of a mother carrying a child; statues of people riding a buffalo; and statues of men coiled by snake.

=== Sriwijaya section ===
The Sriwijaya section contains items related to the Srivijaya, the Malay Buddhist kingdom centered in the city of Palembang. Artifacts found in this room are pottery crafts, beads, metal cast objects, and inscriptions. Most of the inscriptions are replicas, the originals are mostly housed in the National Museum in Jakarta or in the Sriwijaya Kingdom Archaeological Park. Examples of the inscription replicas displayed in the Balaputradeva Museum are the 7th century Kedukan Bukit, Telaga Batu, Kota Kapur, Talang Tuwo, Boom Baru, Kambang Unglen I, Kambang Unglen II, and the Siddhayatra inscriptions. This section also displays Hindu-Buddhist statues from the period.

=== Palembang Sultanate section ===
This section features relics from the 18th-century Palembang Sultanate period e.g. songket looms and clothes. Among the most notable songket in the collection is the six-meter songket cloth with Naga Besaung motifs. Other collections displayed include Palembang wooden carvings e.g. couches, chairs, and doors in traditional carvings. The courtyard features a traditional Palembang's rumah limas and South Sumatran rumah ulu.

== See also ==
- List of museums and cultural institutions in Indonesia
- Rumah limas

== Cited works ==
- Ahmad Ibo (2017). "Menelusuri Sejarah Palembang di Museum Balaputera Dewa" [Exploring the History of Palembang in Balaputera Dewa Museum]. Indonesia Kaya (in Indonesian). Indonesia Kaya. Archived from the original on December 12, 2016.
- Manguin, Pierre-Yves (2008). "'Welcome to Bumi Sriwijaya' or the Building of a Provincial Identity in Contemporary Indonesia" (PDF). Asia Research Institute. Working Paper Series (102). Archived from the original (PDF) on May 19, 2017.
