= Old Port Pacification Superintendency =

Old Port Pacification Superintendency 舊港宣慰使司
- Client state of Great Ming
- 1407–c. 1440
- Government
  - Type: Principality
- Chieftain xuanweishi (Chinese: 宣慰使)
  - 1407-c. 1423: Shi Jinqing
- History
  - Established: Oct 8 1407
  - Disestablished: c. 1440
Preceded by	Succeeded by
Liang Daoming	Majapahit
- Today part of: Indonesia

Old Port Pacification Superintendency (Chinese: 舊港宣慰司) was a pacification superintendency (宣慰司) established by Ming dynasty during early 15th century located in today's Palembang, Indonesia.

== List of rulers ==
- Shi Jinqing (Chinese: 施进卿) – he was appointed as the ruler of Palembang by the Ming dynasty in 1407
- Shi Jisun (Chinese: 施濟孫) – the son of Shi Jinqing; after his father's death, he contested the rulership of Palembang against his sister, Shi Er-jie; he applied to the Ming dynasty in 1424 to succeed his father as the ruler of Palembang
- Shi Er-jie (Chinese: 施二姐) – the second daughter of Shi Jinqing; she succeeded her father; Ma Huan witnessed that she was the ruler of Palembang in 1431

== See also ==
- Battle of Palembang (1407)
- Shi Jinqing
