= Battle of Palembang (1407) =

1407 naval battle in Asia

- Part of the Ming treasure voyages
Date	1407
Location	Palembang, Sumatra
Result	Ming victory

Belligerents
Ming China	Pirate fleet at Palembang

Commanders and leaders
Admiral Zheng He	Chen Zuyi

Casualties and losses
Unknown	5,000 pirates killed Ten ships destroyed Seven ships captured

The Battle of Palembang was a naval battle fought between Ming China's treasure fleet commanded by Admiral Zheng He and the pirate fleet led by Chen Zuyi at Palembang, Sumatra, in modern-day Indonesia. It happened in 1407. The battle resulted in the defeat of Chen Zuyi, who was captured and sent to China for execution.

== Background ==
Chen Zuyi was a pirate leader who had seized Palembang on Sumatra. He dominated the maritime route of the Malaccan Strait. The chronicler Ma Huan wrote that Shi Jinqing informed Admiral Zheng He about Chen Zuyi's depredations. The Haiquo Quangji by Shen Moushang states that Shi Jinqing secretly reported Chen Zuyi's plans to attack Zheng He to him.

== Course ==
In 1407, while returning homewards from their voyage, Ming China's treasure fleet led by Admiral Zheng He engaged the pirate fleet led by Chen Zuyi in battle at Palembang. The Chinese fleet defeated Chen's pirate fleet in this encounter. During the confrontation, 5,000 pirates were killed, ten pirate ships were destroyed, and seven pirate ships were captured.

The Mingshi records that Zheng was initially sent to Palembang to negotiate the pacification of Chen and others, but it also states that Chen and the others plotted to attack Ming China's forces. The Taizong Shilu records that Chen tried to evade and withdraw from active engagement with Ming China's treasure fleet. Dreyer (2007) characterizes the much-later account of Chen in the Mingshi as a disparaging attempt to portray him as an evil pirate and thereby contrast him from the Chinese merchants of Palembang who submitted.

Ming China's treasure fleet took three prisoners, including Chen, back to the Chinese capital Nanjing for decapitation.

== Aftermath ==
On 2 October 1407, Chen Zuyi and his lieutenants were executed. On 29 October 1407, the Yongle Emperor of Ming China issued an order to reward the officers and other crew members who went to battle against Chen's pirate fleet at Palembang.

Ming China's imperial court appointed Shi Jinqing as the Pacification Superintendent of Palembang, which established an ally there and secured access to its port.

== See also ==
- Ming–Kotte War

== Bibliography ==
- Chan, Hok-lam (1998). "The Chien-wen, Yung-lo, Hung-hsi, and Hsüan-te reigns, 1399–1435". The Cambridge History of China, Volume 7: The Ming Dynasty, 1368–1644, Part 1. Cambridge, England: Cambridge University Press. ISBN 9780521243322.
- Dreyer, Edward L. (2007). Zheng He: China and the Oceans in the Early Ming Dynasty, 1405–1433. New York, NY: Pearson Longman. ISBN 9780321084439.
- Duyvendak, J. J. L. (1939). "The True Dates of the Chinese Maritime Expeditions in the Early Fifteenth Century". T'oung Pao. 34 (5): 341–413. doi:10.1163/156853238X00171. JSTOR 4527170.
- Ray, Haraprasad (1987). "An Analysis of the Chinese Maritime Voyages into the Indian Ocean during Early Ming Dynasty and their Raison d'Etre". China Report. 23 (1): 65–87. doi:10.1177/000944558702300107. S2CID 154116680.
- Sen, Tansen (2016). "The Impact of Zheng He's Expeditions on Indian Ocean Interactions". Bulletin of the School of Oriental and African Studies. 79 (3): 609–636. doi:10.1017/S0041977X16001038.
