= Great Lady of Gresik =

Chinese-Muslim noblewoman

Great Lady of Gresik or Nyai Gede Pinatih was a Chinese-Muslim noblewoman from Palembang during the Majapahit era. Her Chinese name is Shishi Daniangzi (Chinese: 施氏大娘仔), abbreviated as Shi Daniang, and her non-Chinese name is Pinatih (Chinese: 俾那智). She was the daughter of chieftain xuanweishi Shi Jinqing of Palembang. She left Palembang and went to Gresik in east Java to preach her religion to the natives.

== Early life ==
Born Shishi Daniangzi (施氏大娘子), she was the eldest daughter of a non-Muslim Chinese business elite, Shi Jinqing, in Palembang.

Upon her father's death around 1421, a family feud broke out over the rule of Palembang between her brother, Shi Jisun (施濟孫), and her younger sister, Shi Er-Jie (施二姐). Eventually, Shi Er-Jie won the feud and gained the rule.

As Shi Er-Jie's older sister, she was politically influential during Shi Er-Jie's reign.

== Life in Java ==
In the 1440s, she left for Java and was made a shahbander (port master) of Gresik by the ruler of Majapahit from 1458 to 1483. She reportedly sent her ships to trade in Bali, the Moluccas and Cambodia.

She was known as Nyai Pinateh, also known as Njai Gede Pinatih.

In Gresik, she raised a child who would later become one of the Walisongo saints, Sunan Giri (Raden Paku).

== Legacy ==
She is honoured at her grave site as a promoter of Islam and the 'foster-mother' of Sunan Giri.

== Books ==
- Admiral Zheng He & Southeast Asia by Suryadinata Leo ISBN 981-230-329-4
