= Zhou Man =

Zhou Man (Chinese: 周滿; pinyin: Zhōu Mǎn), was a 15th-century Chinese admiral and explorer. He was born into a wealthy merchant family in the year 1378. When he was six years old, his father died on an overseas voyage to Korea. Mourning his father's death, he left his mother and his four younger siblings behind. He worked his way into the emperor's staff by the age of 22. At 32, he was assigned "Grand Leader of All Vessels Commanded by the Emperor's Swift Hand".

Zhou, with the help of three other commanders, explored wide reaches of the Indian Ocean. A stone inscription, dated 1431, at the Palace of the Celestial Spouse in Liujiagang, Jiangsu is translated as:

We, Zheng He and his companions [including Admirals Hong Bao, Zhou Man, Zhou Wen, and Yang Qing], at the beginning of Zhu Di's reign received the Imperial Commission as envoys to the barbarians. Up until now seven voyages have taken place and, each time, we have commanded several tens of thousands of government soldiers and more than a hundred oceangoing vessels. We have...reached countries of the Eastern Regions, more than thirty countries in all. We have...beheld in the ocean huge waves like mountains rising sky-high, and we have set eyes on barbarian regions far away, hidden in a blue transparency of light vapors, whilst our sails, loftily unfurled like clouds, day and night continued their course, rapid like that of a star, traversing those savage waves.

== In fiction ==
Thomas Seinbeck's In the Shade of the Cypress (published 2010) is a historical novel whose main character is Zhou Man.

In his book 1421: The Year China Discovered the World, amateur historian Gavin Menzies argues that Zhou Man built a fortress at Bittangabee Bay Australia and that his fleet approached and mapped the Pacific coast of North America and may have been wiped out by a megatsunami resulting from a comet impact creating Mahuika crater. The Australian geographer Professor Victor Prescott states that the structure at Bittangabee is considered by local archaeologists to be early 19th century and that Menzies misinterpreted the Waldseemüller map which he used as evidence for a visit by Zhou Man to the Americas.
