= Hong Bao =

Ming dynasty explorer

The 7th voyage of Zheng He's fleet. A possible route of Hong Bao's squadron is shown as a dashed line, based on analysis by Edward L. Dreyer.

Hong Bao (Chinese: 洪保; fl. ca. 1412–1433) was a Chinese eunuch sent on overseas diplomatic missions during the reigns of the Yongle Emperor and Xuande Emperor of the Ming dynasty. He is best known as the commander of one of the detached squadrons of Zheng He's fleet during the seventh voyage to the Indian Ocean (1431–1433).

== Early career ==
According to the History of Ming, in 1412 (i.e., some time between the third and fourth voyages of Zheng He's fleet), Hong Bao was sent by the Yongle Emperor as the envoy to Thailand.

In 1421 Hong Bao participated in the sixth voyage of Zheng He, during which foreign envoys were transported back to their countries, as far as Ormus.

== Hong Bao on the Seventh Voyage of Zheng He ==
Hong Bao's name appears in the inscription made by Zheng He in Liujiagang in 1431, before his fleet left China on its 7th (and last) voyage to the "Western Ocean" (Indian Ocean). According to the inscription, the two Principal Envoys (正使) sent by the Xuande Emperor to the countries of the Western Ocean were the eunuchs Zheng He and Wang Jinghong. Hong Bao was one of the five Assistant Envoys (副使) (along with Zhu Liang, Zhou Man, Yang Zhen, and Zhang Da). Hong Bao, as well as all other Principal and Assistant Envoys except for Zhang Da, had the eunuch rank of Grand Director (太監, Taijian).

Much of what we know about Hong Bao comes from the book written by the interpreter Ma Huan, who served in his squadron during the 7th voyage of Zheng He's fleet. According to Edward L. Dreyer's analysis of the preserved sources about the voyage, in particular Ma Huan's book, Hong Bao commanded a squadron which most likely separated from the main fleet in Semudera in northern Sumatra (although other suggested it may have happened earlier, in Qui Nhon in Champa), and visited Bengal. From Bengal, Hong Bao's squadron would then go to Calicut in southern India, to which the main fleet came directly from Semudera across the Bay of Bengal.

While the main fleet left Calicut to Ormus (in Persian Gulf), Hong Bao's squadron went from Calicut to various destinations on the west side of the Arabian Sea in southern Arabia and Horn of Africa, including Aden and Mogadishu. Before leaving Calicut, Hong Bao sent seven of his men, including Ma Huan, to Mecca and Medina with a ship from Calicut (Note: Ma Huan's account is ambiguous on whether the Chinese traveled on a foreign ship or on their own Chinese ships in company of a foreign ship. The Chinese likely traveled with their own ships: (1) the Arabic texts Kitab as-Suluk li-ma rifat duwal al-muluk by al-Maqrizi and the Inba' al Gumr bi nba' al-umr by al-Asqallani use terminology specific to Chinese ships, (2) a letter by a captain to the authorities in Jeddah and Mecca for permission to make port was received as Chinese, and (3) the massive Chinese treasure ships—not Indian or Arab ships—were able to transport large animals for a very long span of time. (Jost 2019, 86–88)) going to Jeddah.

== Grave ==
In June 2010, the Chief of Archaeology Department at Nanjing Museum Wang Zhigao announced that a Ming Dynasty grave recently found near Zutang Mountain (祖堂山) in the Jiangning District of Nanjing was identified as that of Hong Bao (and not of Zheng He himself, as it was earlier surmised).

== Bibliography ==
- Dreyer, Edward L. (2006), Zheng He: China and the oceans in the early Ming dynasty, 1405-1433, The library of world biography, Pearson Longman, ISBN 0-321-08443-8
- Jost, Alexander (2019). ""He Did Not Kiss the Earth Between His Hands": Arabic Sources on the Arrivals of the Zheng He Fleet in Aden and Mecca (1419–1432)". Early Global Interconnectivity Across the Indian Ocean World, Volume I: Commercial Structures and Exchanges. Cham: Palgrave Macmillan. ISBN 978-3-319-97666-2.
- Tsai, Shih-Shan Henry (2002), Perpetual Happiness: The Ming Emperor Yongle, University of Washington Press, ISBN 0-295-98124-5
