= Sultan Mahmud Badaruddin II Museum =

Museum of the Palembang Sultanate

- Museum Sultan Mahmud Badaruddin II
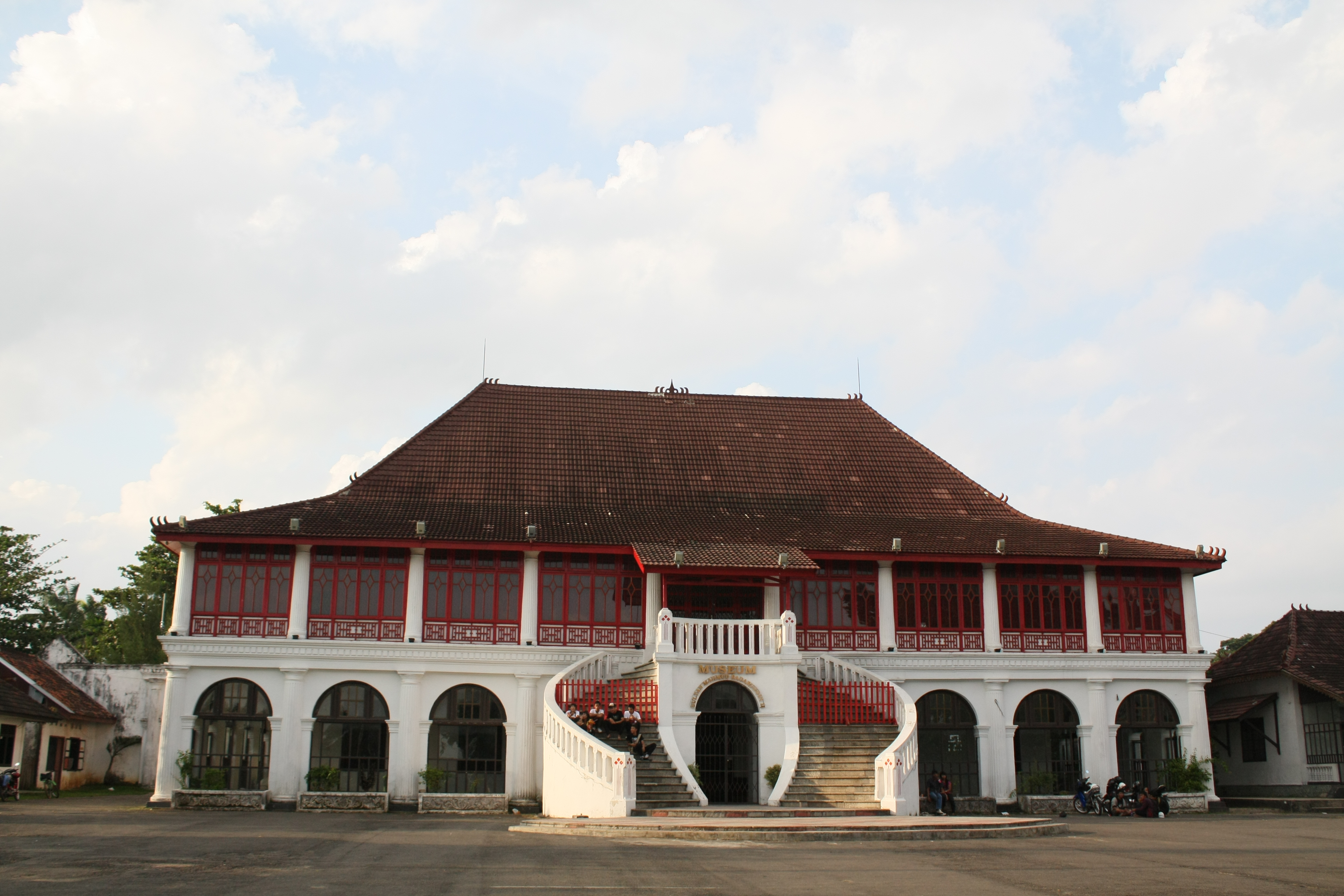
- Sultan Mahmud Badaruddin II Museum

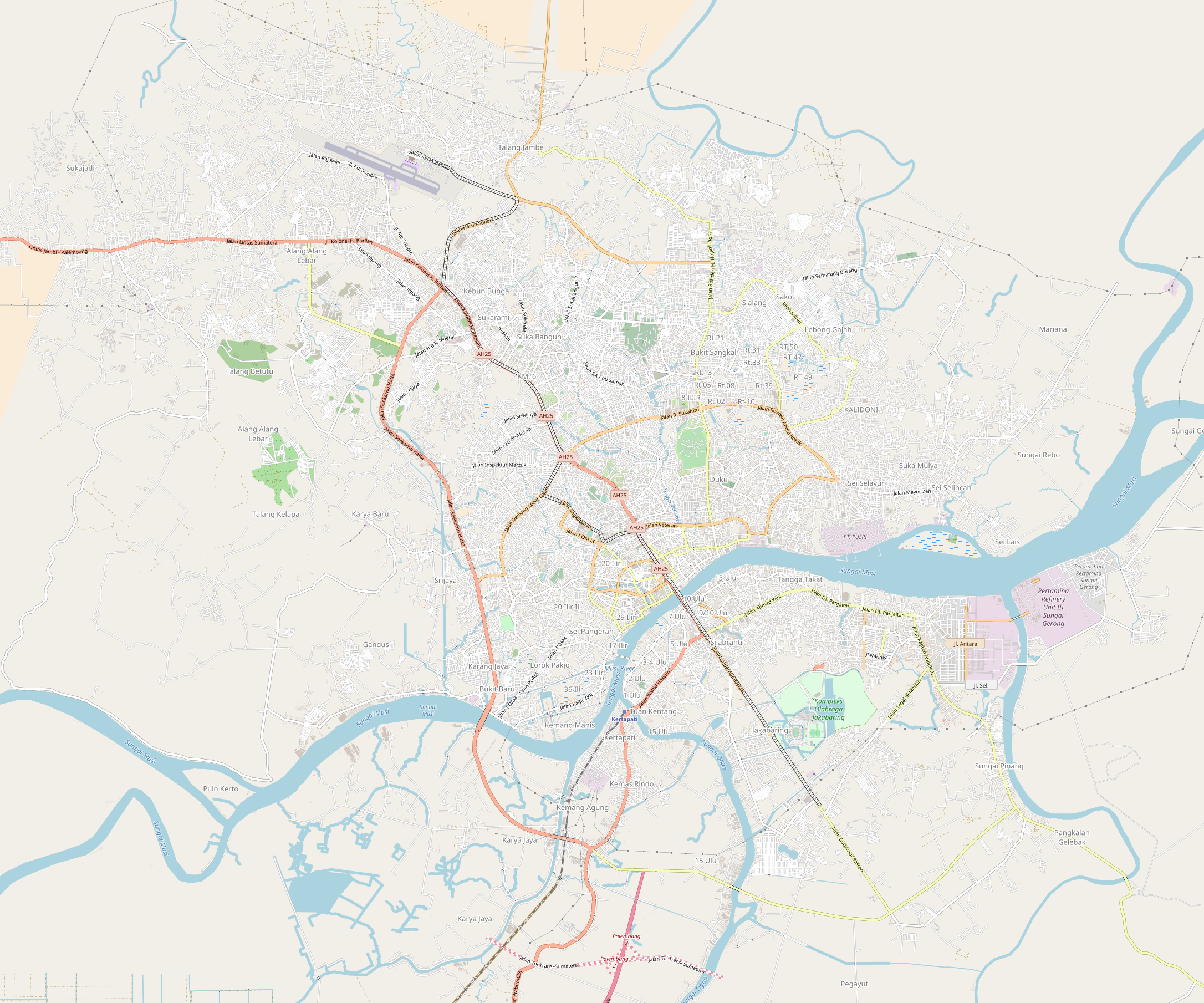
- Location within Palembang
- Former names: Residentiehuis

General information
- Status: Museum
- Architectural style: Indies Empire style
- Location: Palembang, Indonesia, Jl. Sultan Mahmud Badarudin, 19 Ilir, Bukit Kecil
- Coordinates: 2.990313°S 104.761067°E
- Construction started: 1823
- Estimated completion: 1825

Sultan Mahmud Badaruddin II Museum is a municipal museum in Palembang, Indonesia. The museum is established inside a 19th-century building former of the office of the colonial resident of South Sumatra. The building also houses the tourist department of Palembang.

== History ==
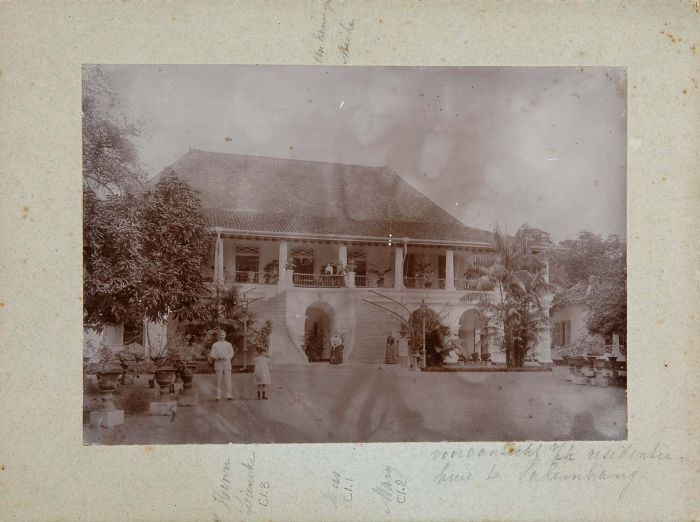
House of the Resident in 19th-century

The location of the present museum was originally the location of the Kuta Lama, the old palace of Sultan Mahmud Badaruddin I (1724–1758), sovereign of the Palembang Sultanate. Following the abolition of the Palembang Sultanate, the palace of Kuta Lama was demolished by the British colonial government on October 7, 1823. The abolition of the Sultanate was a form of punishment made by the British colonial government toward the Palembang Sultanate for the massacre that occurred in the Dutch lodge Sungai Alur, although this may have been a political movement to remove the sovereignty of the Sultanate from the city.

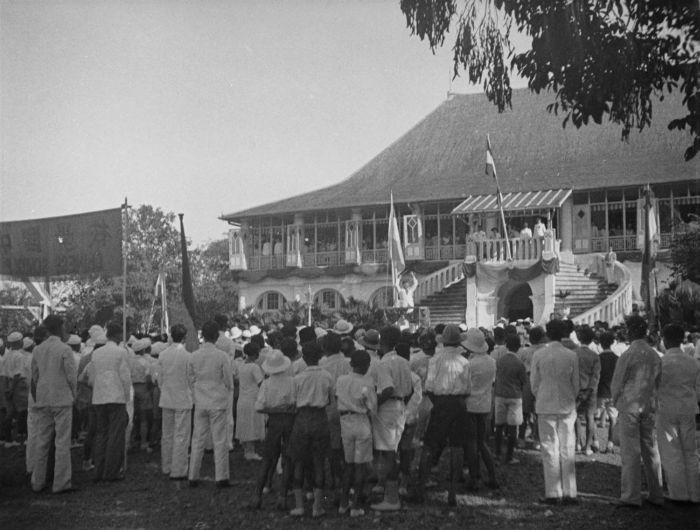
The huis of the Resident in Palembang during the jubileum of Queen Wilhelmina

Immediately after the demolition of the Kuta Lama, in 1823, a new building was built on top of the ruin. The first building was completed in 1824 and was named Gedung Siput ("snail building"). Later the building was rebuilt into the building that currently stands on the site. The new building is a two-floored stone building built in a style which blend European style with the tropical architecture of the Indies, focusing on the traditional rumah bari style found in Palembang. In 1825, the building was used as the office for the colonial resident. In the 1920s the building was renovated with the addition of more glass.

During the World War II, the building was used as the military headquarters of the Japanese occupants.

Following the independence of Indonesia, the building became the headquarter for the Kodam II/Sriwijaya Indonesian Army for a short period. The building was later transferred to the government of Palembang before finally converted into a museum in 1984. The collecting of objects for Sultan Mahmud Badaruddin II Museum was started in 1984 when the rumah bari, an authentic limas house, was transported to a new location at Balaputradeva Museum. Some collections that were previously housed in the rumah bari was moved to Sultan Mahmud Badaruddin II Museum.

== Collection and artifacts ==
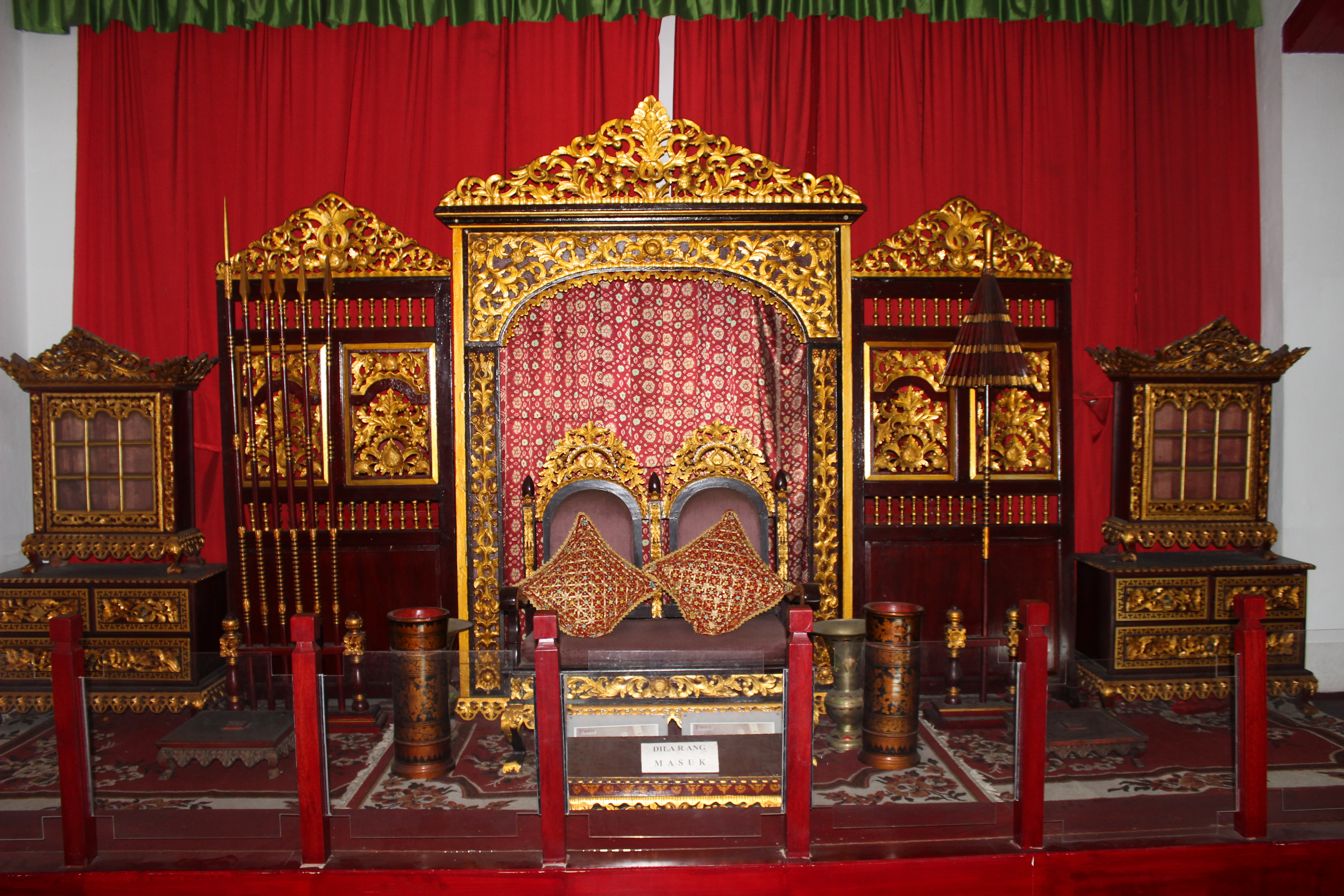
The throne of the sultan of Palembang

Sultan Mahmud Badaruddin II Museum displays a predictable collection of South Sumatran textiles, weapons, traditional dress, crafts, and coins. The gardens of the museum is filled with artefacts from the Srivijayan period, e.g. statues of Ganesha and Buddha.

== Cited works ==
- Association of Southeast Asian Archaeologists in Western Europe (1992). Ian, Glover (ed.). Southeast Asian archaeology 1990: proceedings of the third Conference of the European Association of Southeast Asian Archaeologists. University of Hull. ISBN 9780859585934.
- Manguin, Pierre-Yves (2008). "'Welcome to Bumi Sriwijaya' or the Building of a Provincial Identity in Contemporary Indonesia" (PDF). Asia Research Institute. Working Paper Series (102).
- Pemerintahan Kota Palembang (2008). Buku Museum Sultan Mahmud Badaruddin II. Palembang: Musi Persona Persada.
- Syarufie, Yudhy (2005). Palembang Kota Wisata Sungai [River Tour City of Palembang] (in Indonesian). Palembang: Kreasi Kifi.
- Taal, Sandra (2002). Nas, Peter J.M. (ed.). Cultural expressions, collective memory and the urban landscape in Palembang - The Indonesian Town Revisited. Southeast Asian Dynamics. Vol. 1. Münster: LIT Verlag. ISBN 9783825860387.

== See also ==
- Indies Empire style
- List of museums and cultural institutions in Indonesia
