= Nyai Gede Pinateh =

Merchant in Java

Nyai Gede Pinateh (fl. circa 1450–1500) was a prominent Muslim-Chinese merchant in Java.

Born Shishi Daniangzi (施氏大娘子), she was the eldest daughter of a prominent Muslim-Chinese chieftain and business elite, Shi Jinqing. He was appointed by the Ming Dynasty during the Yongle era as the Pacification Commissioner in Palembang for his meritorious service in assisting Admiral Zheng He in suppressing the notorious pirate, Chen Zuyi. In Java, she was known by the locals as Nyai Gede Pinateh.

She was the foster mother of Sunan Giri, of the Wali Songo.

During this period, maritime Southeast Asia was known for the prominent role of women in commerce. Among common households, however, trade was generally conducted on a small scale as part of domestic economic activities and was regarded as a woman's responsibility. Large-scale commercial enterprises were typically controlled by royal courts and foreign merchants. Nyai Gede Pinatih was an exception, as she managed a large-scale mercantile enterprise, an uncommon achievement for a Javanese woman of the period. She also served as the shahbandar (harbour master) of Gresik and dispatched merchant vessels to trade with Bali, the Maluku Islands, and Cambodia.
