= Geding Suro =

Historical building in Palembang, Indonesia

Coordinates: 2°58′40″S 104°47′33″E

Geding Suro is a cemetery complex with the oldest history in Palembang, Indonesia. The complex, which is located at 3 ilir Palembang, is an Islamic cemetery from the mid-16th century with 8 buildings and 38 burials. There were a total of 38 ancient graves discovered there, Ki Gede Ing Suro is one of the historical figures interred at the cemetery complex, which was constructed about the middle of the sixteenth century.

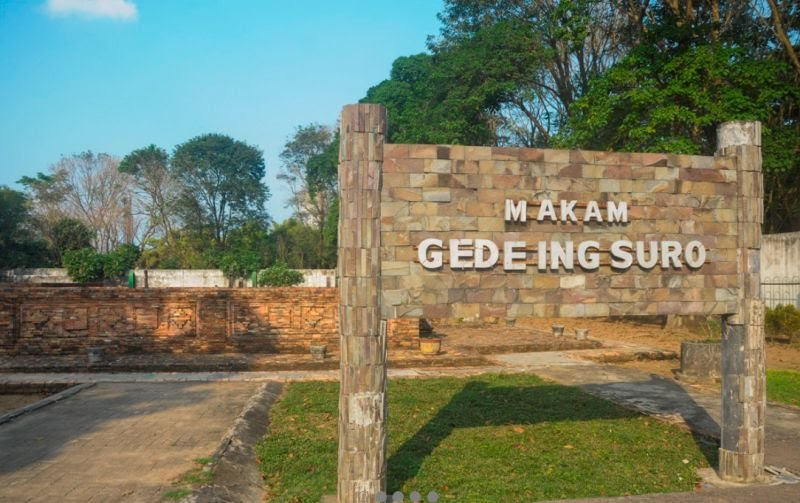
Gede Ing Suro grave complex

== Location ==
The Gede Ing Suro Tomb Complex is located on terrain that is approximately 4 meters above sea level. The complex is slightly elevated to the north. A moat encircles the complex's location, part of which have been filled in and others of which are now used as farmland. The Sriwijaya Fertilizer Factory fence surrounds the complex to the east, while the Musi River borders it to the south and there are residential areas in the complex's southern portion.

== History ==
Previously, Ki Gede Ing Suro's burial complex was known as a religious site. Ki Gede Ing Suro was the son of Ki Gede Ing Lautan, one of 24 Demak nobles who went to Palembang after the collapse of Java's largest Islamic state. This turmoil is a long series of events in the history of the Majapahit Kingdom, the archipelago's biggest kingdom after the Sriwijaya Kingdom. This marked the start of the Palembang kingdom's conversion to Islam during the reign of Ki Gede Ing Suro.

Around 1930, the Dutch learned about and rediscovered Gede ing Suro's grave. It was previously poorly recognized or unknown since Gede ing Suro's cemetery was located in a Palembang Darussalam Palace forest, making it invisible. The construction of the tombs of the forerunners of the Palembang Darussalam Sultanate, which the Dutch had burned in the 17th century AD, is related to the historical backdrop of the area around Gede ing Suro's tomb. As a result of this occurrence, the Sultanate's whole tomb or supporting buildings made of wood were burned and destroyed. Since the event, Palembang residents have forgotten about the Gede ing Suro tomb and its surrounds.
