= Shi Jinqing =

Shi Jinqing (Chinese: 施進卿; Xiao'erjing: شِ دٍ شٍ, died c. 1421) was a late 14th century chieftain in Palembang. He was a Muslim whose ancestors were Hui people from Hangzhou. The Ming imperial administration appointed him as chieftain xuanweishi (Chinese: 宣慰使) of the Old Port Pacification Superintendency in Palembang for his contribution in helping Ming admiral Zheng He defeat the pirate leader Chen Zuyi. Shi Jinqing had already been appointed an official civil servant of the Majapahit kingdom of Java, sent to Palembang to serve as a minister after the Majapahit defeated Srivijaya in the year 1377.

== Children ==
He had two daughters and one son:

- Eldest Daughter: Shishi Daniangzi (施氏大娘子) – she was also known as Nyai Gede Pinateh or the Great Lady of Gresik and went to Gresik in East Java to preach Islam
- Second Daughter: Shi Er-Jie (施二姐) – after her father's death, she became the ruler
- Only Son: Shi Jisun (Chinese: 施濟孫) – he competed with his sister Shi Er-Jie for power after their father died in c. 1421

== See also ==
- Liang Daoming
- Battle of Palembang (1407)

== Web references ==
- The 6th overseas Chinese state Nanyang Huaren
- Zheng He and pre-colonial coastal urban development in Southeast Asia.
- Wali Songo pilgrimage
- Sejarah Keturunan Tionghoa di Asia Tenggara yang Tak Dikenal Khalayak Ramai (Malay)

== Books ==
- Admiral Zheng He & Southeast Asia by Suryadinata Leo ISBN 981-230-329-4
