= Wang Jinghong =

Wang Jinghong (Chinese: 王景弘; pinyin: Wáng Jǐnghóng; Wade–Giles: Wang Ching-hung; died c. 1434) was a Ming dynasty Chinese mariner, explorer, diplomat and fleet admiral, who was deputy to Zheng He on his treasure voyages to Southeast Asia, South Asia, and East Africa, from 1405 to 1433. He led an eighth voyage to Sumatra but is said to have died in a shipwreck on the way. He was buried at Semarang in Java aged 78.
