= Chen Zuyi =

Chinese pirate

Chen Zuyi 陳祖義
- Born: 14th century Guangdong
- Died: 2 October 1407; Nanjing
- Piratical career
- Type: Pirate
- Years active: 1400-1407
- Rank: Captain
- Base of operations: South China Sea, Java Sea, Strait of Malacca
- Battles: Battle of Palembang

Chen Zuyi (Chinese: 陳祖義; Wade–Giles: Ch'en Tsu-i); died 2 October 1407) was a 15th-century Chinese pirate from Guangdong, and was one of the most feared pirates to infest the seas of Southeast Asia. He ruled the city of Palembang, and raided the Strait of Malacca to plunder shipping and prey on both native and foreign merchants for several years. His fleet was defeated by the Ming dynasty Admiral Zheng He at the Battle of Palembang (1407). Chen was captured and sent to Chinese capital Nanjing for execution.

== Early career ==
According to Ming records his name is first recorded after 1400, when a Ming convoy was attacked by pirates commanded by Chen Zuyi. At Palembang Chen had 5,000 men and 10 ships under his command, and was the strongest pirate of Southeast Asia at the time. The island of Sumatra had a diverse ethnicity of people from different parts of Asia, including a large minority of Han Chinese population (mostly male migrants, traders and merchants), and as well as the majority Sumatrans. A Hui Chinese, Shi Jinqing, reported the atrocities committed by the pirate chieftains, and requested assistance to help get rid of Chen Zuyi.

However, forcing passing vessels to pay duties was an essential financial element of Southeast Asian state governance, and it has been suggested that Chen Zuyi was merely doing the same for his Palembang port city.

== Defeat by Zheng He ==
In 1407, Chen was confronted at Palembang by the returning Ming treasure fleet under Admiral Zheng He. Zheng made the opening gambit, demanding Chen's surrender, and Chen quickly signalled agreement—while preparing for a surprise pre-emptive strike. But details of his plan were disclosed to Zheng by a local Chinese informant, and in the fierce battle that ensued, the superior Ming armada destroyed the pirate fleet and killed 5,000 of its men. Chen was captured and sent to Chinese capital Nanjing for public execution in 1407. Peace was restored to the Strait of Malacca as Shi Jinqing was installed as Palembang's new ruler and incorporated into what would become a far-flung system of allies who acknowledged Ming supremacy in return for diplomatic recognition, military protection, and trading rights. By the end of the Yongle reign, the kings or ambassadors of more than 30 foreign states had paid official visits to the emperor bearing tribute. They were ferried to China in luxurious staterooms on the Chinese treasure ships.

== In popular culture ==
Chen Zuyi is portrayed by the actor Hou Xiangling in the 2009 Chinese television series Zheng He Xia Xiyang, which marked the 600th anniversary of Zheng He's voyages. Chen's defeat was considered the most famous of all Zheng He's military achievements.

== See also ==
- Liang Daoming
- Malacca Sultanate
- Haijin
