= Rumah limas =

Type of traditional house in Indonesia

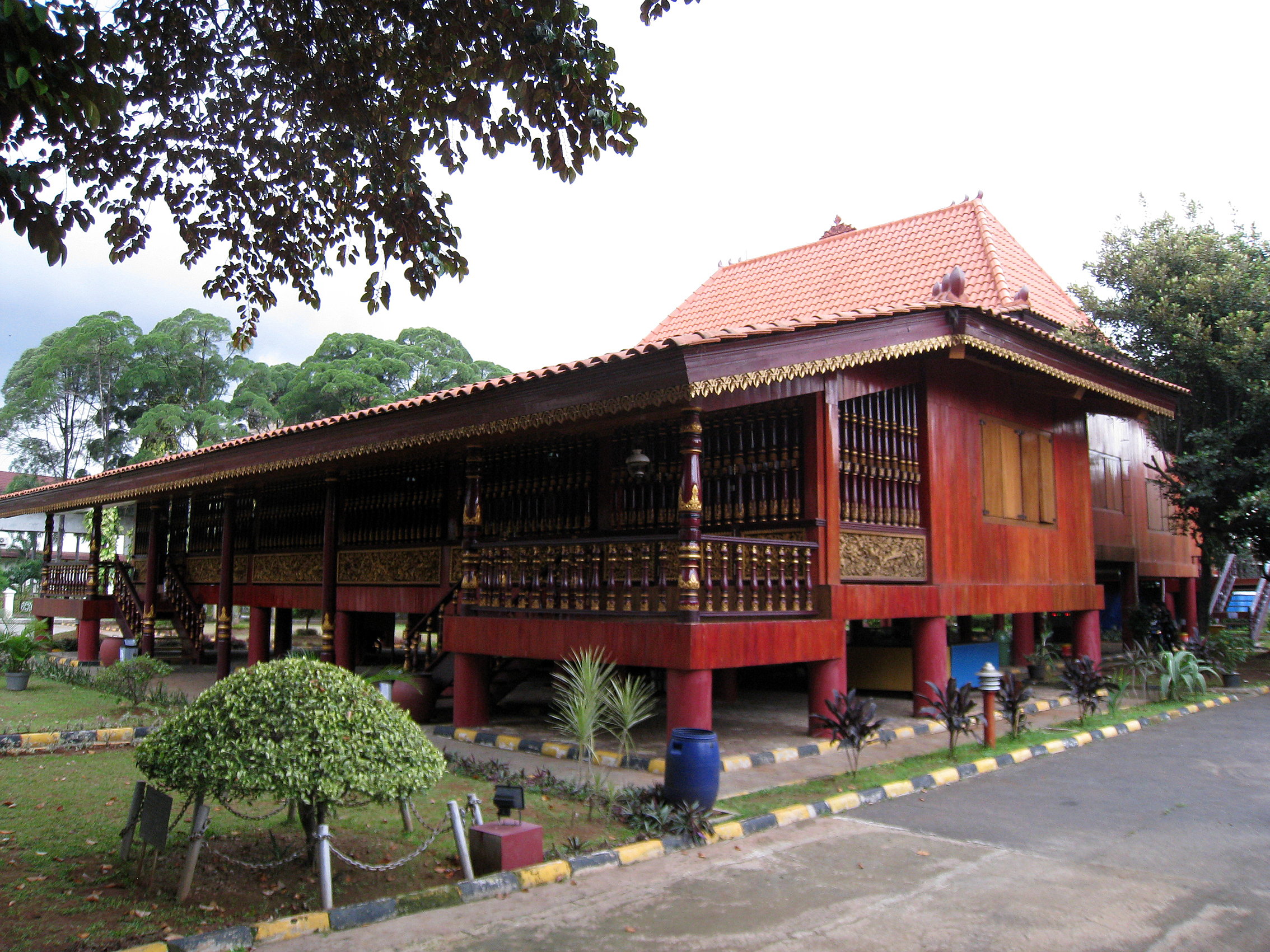
Limas house with its typical multi-level floor in Taman Mini Indonesia Indah, Jakarta

Rumah limas ("limas house"), also known as rumah bari ("old house"), is a type of traditional house found in Palembang, South Sumatra, Indonesia. It can also be found in Baturaja. The house is traditionally made of wood and raised on stilts, with a stepped, or gradated, floor composed of two to five areas at slightly different heights, a broad porch, and a distinctive roof. In Palembang, these houses are associated with the nobility and other people of high status.

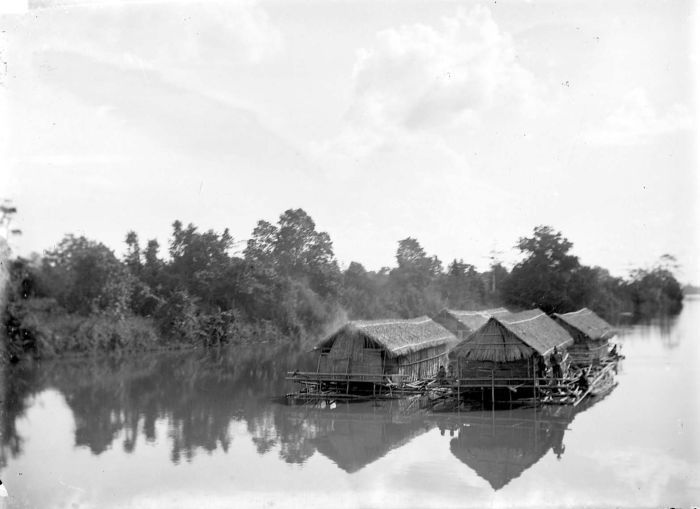
Rumah rakit in Musi River bank near Palembang in 1917.

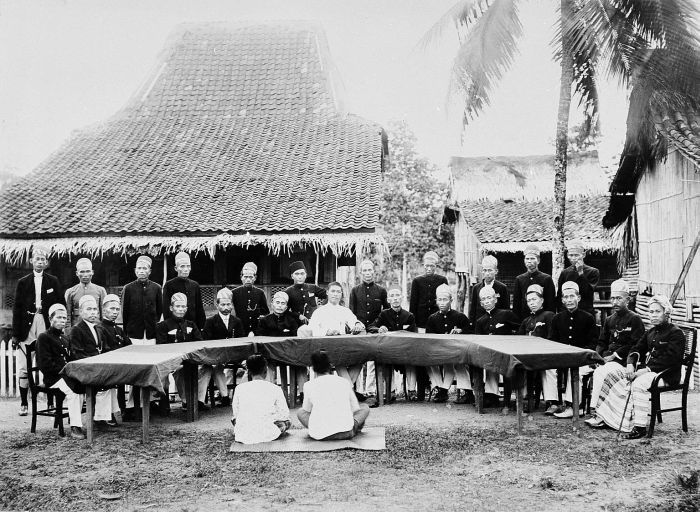
A front facade of a limas house is in the background.

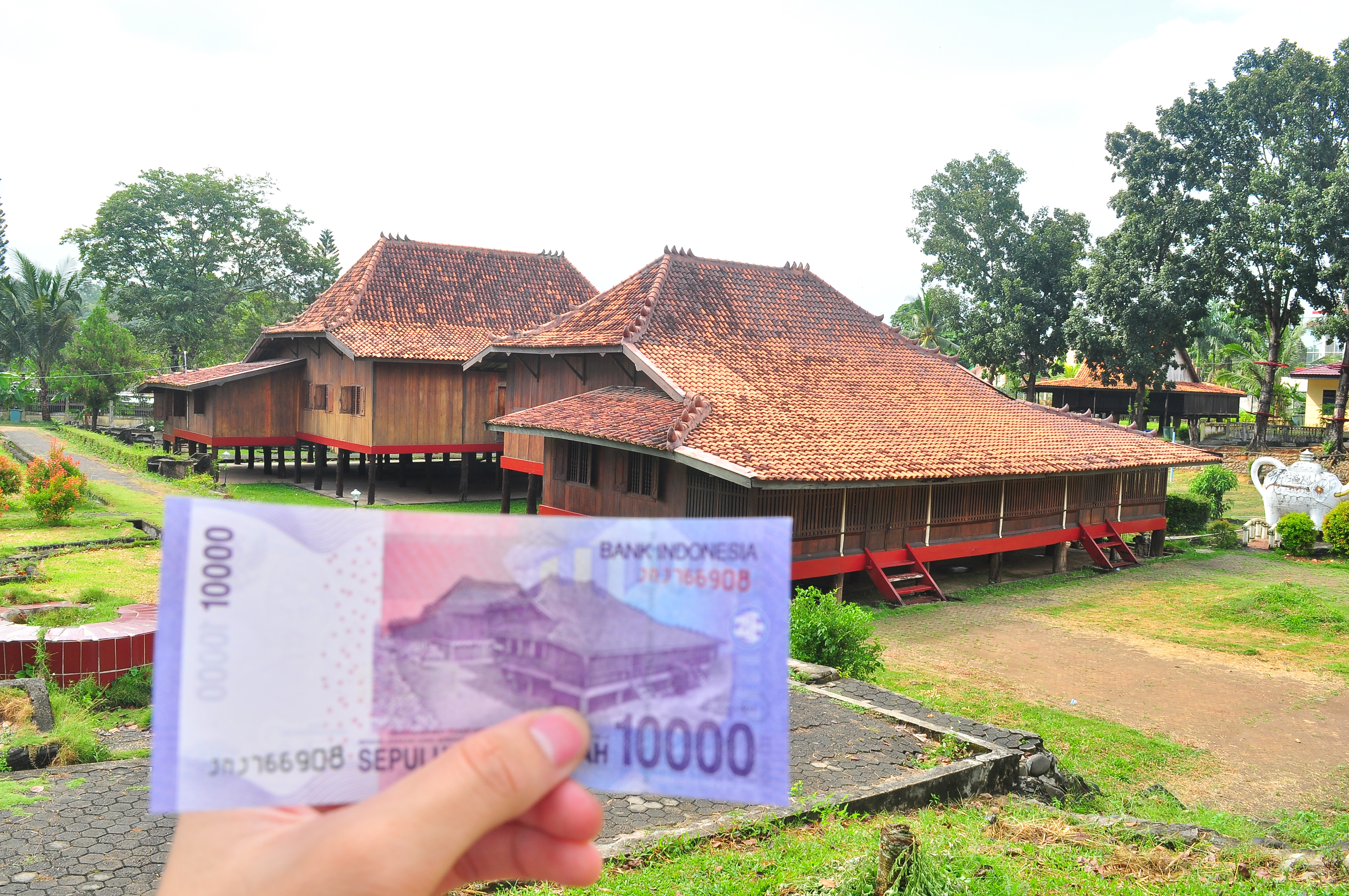
Rumah limas of IDR 10000 banknote is now located in Museum Balaputradewa, Palembang.

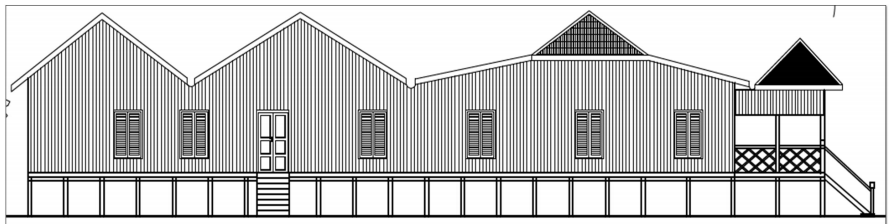
Side view plan of rumah limas.

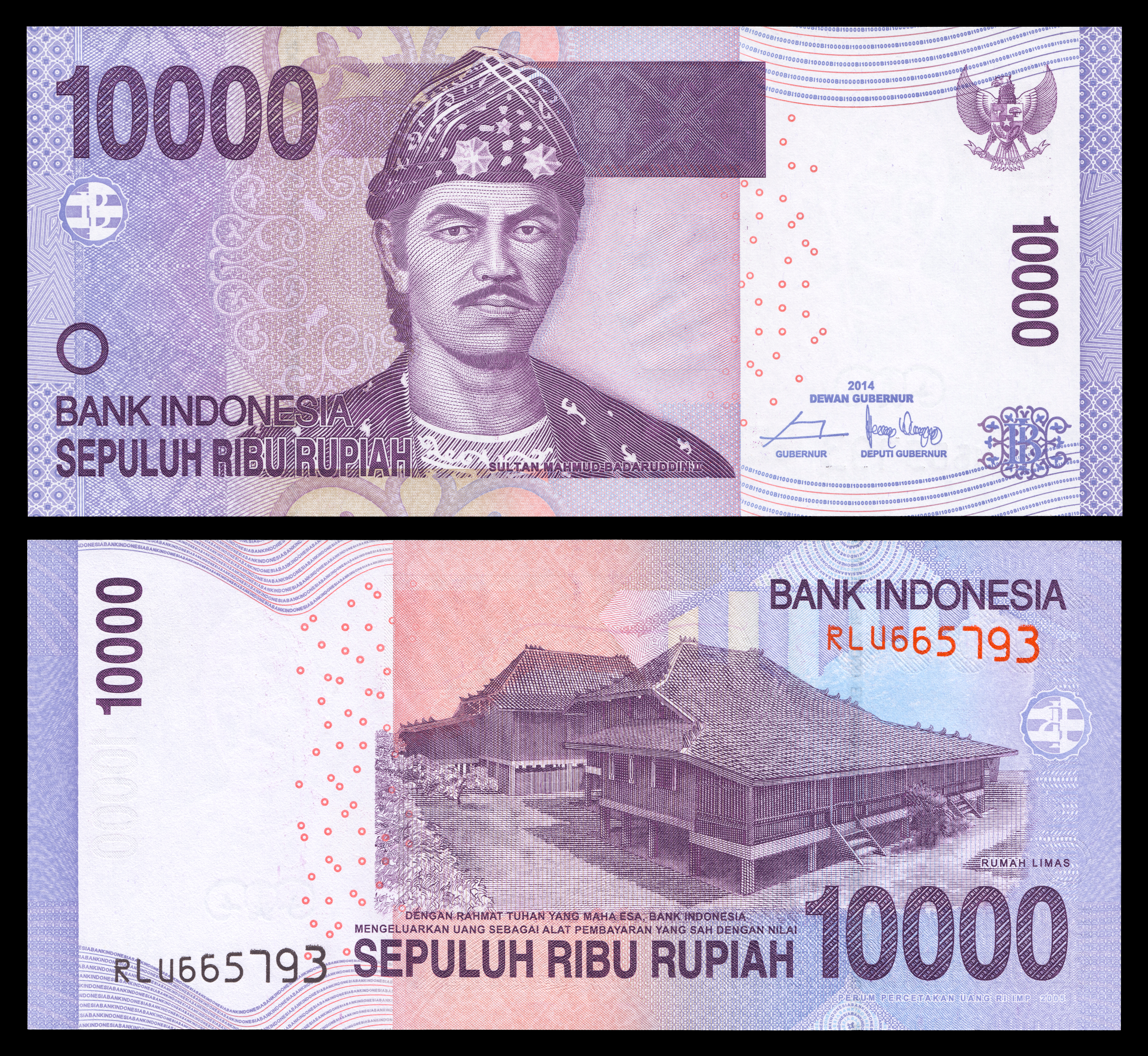
The limas house of Pangeran Syarif Abdurachman Alhabsi in the Balaputradeva Museum is featured on an Indonesian banknote.

== See also ==
- Malay houses
- Architecture of Indonesia
- Rumah adat

== Cited works ==
- Mohamad Tajuddin Mohamad Rasdi (2005). The Architectural Heritage of the Malay World: The Traditional Houses. Skudai: Universiti Teknologi Malaysia. ISBN 9789835203572.
- Taal, Sandra (2008). Schefold, Reimar; Nas, Peter J.M.; Domenig, Gaudenz; Wessing, Robert (eds.). The limas house of Palembang. Indonesian Houses: Survey of vernacular architecture in western Indonesia. Vol. 2. Leiden: KITLV Press. ISBN 9789004253988.
- Taal, Sandra (2004). Schefold, Reimar; Nas, Peter J.M.; Domenig, Gaudenz (eds.). Change and diversification in form and function of the limas house of Palembang - Indonesian Houses: Tradition and Transformation in Vernacular Architecture. Leiden Series on Indonesian Architecture. Vol. 1. Singapore: Singapore University Press. ISBN 9789971692926.
- Taal, Sandra (2002). Nas, Peter J.M. (ed.). Cultural expressions, collective memory and the urban landscape in Palembang - The Indonesian Town Revisited. Southeast Asian Dynamics. Vol. 1. Münster: LIT Verlag. ISBN 9783825860387.
- Wan Hashim; Abdul Halim Nasir (2011). The Traditional Malay House. Kuala Lumpur: Institut Terjemahan Negara Malaysia. ISBN 9789830683843.
