= Liang Daoming =

King of Palembang in Srivijaya

Map of Liang Daoming's Old Port Palembang.

Liang Daoming (Chinese: 梁道明; pinyin: Liáng Dàomíng; Cantonese Yale: Lèuhng Douh-mìng) was an abscondee of the Chinese Ming Dynasty who became king of Palembang in 1397. He hailed from Guangdong province and was of Cantonese descent.

According to Ming dynasty records, he had thousands of followers and a sizable military contingent in Palembang. Liang Daoming's rule over Palembang was acknowledged by the Ming emperor and protected by Zheng He's armada (1403–1424).

== See also ==
- Chen Zuyi
- Chinese emigration
- Piracy in the Strait of Malacca
- Malacca Sultanate
- Haijin
