= Timeline of the Ming dynasty =

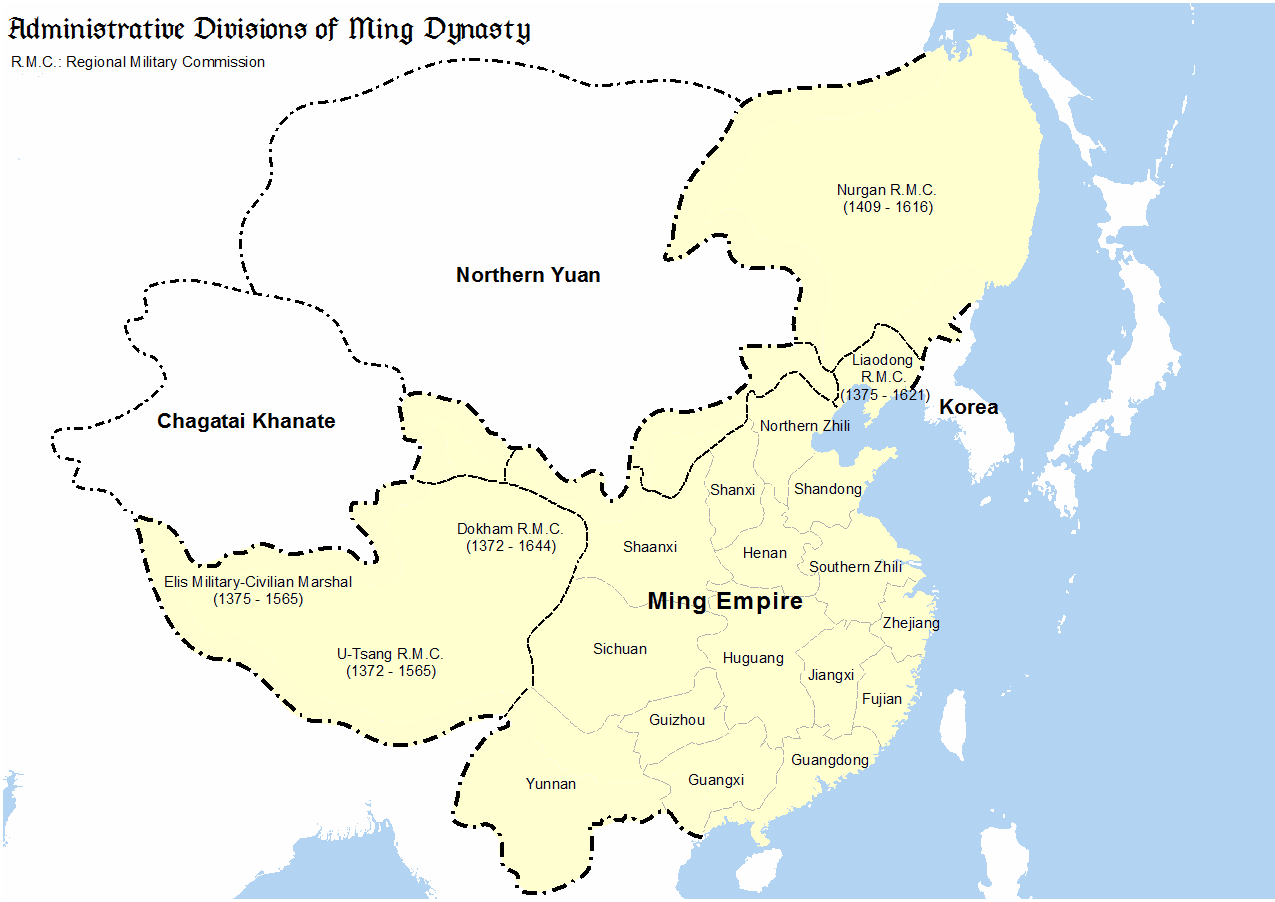
Ming dynasty

A timeline of the Ming dynasty (1368–1644) from the rise of the Hongwu Emperor to the rise and establishment of the Qing dynasty.

== Background ==
=== 1320s ===
Year	Date	Event
1328	21 October	Zhu Yuanzhang is born to a family of poor tenant farmers in Anhui

=== 1330s ===
Year	Date	Event
1332	1 January	Xu Da is born in Fengyang County.

=== 1340s ===
Year	Date	Event
1344	June	An epidemic, locusts, and drought kills Zhu Yuanzhang's family, leaving only himself, his sister-in-law and her young son as the sole survivors
1344	October	Zhu Yuanzhang enters a local Buddhist monastery as a novice to do menial work; eventually he's sent out to beg for food - it's speculated that he ends up joining the army
1347		Zhu Yuanzhang returns to the Buddhist monastery

=== 1350s ===
Year	Date	Event
1352	15 April	Red Turban Rebellion: Zhu Yuanzhang becomes a rebel under Guo Zixing's command in Haozhou
1353		Red Turban Rebellion: Zhu Yuanzhang receives an independent command from Guo Zixing and captures Chuzhou
1355	11 July	Red Turban Rebellion: Zhu Yuanzhang crosses the Changjiang
1355		Red Turban Rebellion: Guo Zixing dies and his eldest son succeeds him, but he also dies, making Zhu Yuanzhang leader of the rebels
1356	10 April	Red Turban Rebellion: Zhu Yuanzhang takes Nanjing
1357	summer	Red Turban Rebellion: Zhang Shide is captured by Zhu Yuanzhang and starves to death
1358		Red Turban Rebellion: Defending garrisons fire cannons en masse at the siege of Shaoxing and defeat Zhu Yuanzhang's forces

=== 1360s ===
Year	Date	Event
1360		Red Turban Rebellion: Chen Youliang murders Xu Shouhui and proclaims the Great Han at Wuchang before attacking Zhu Yuanzhang at Nanjing only to be repulsed
1363	30 August - 4 October	Battle of Lake Poyang: Chen Youliang's fleet is demolished by Zhu Yuanzhang's forces and dies
1363		Red Turban Rebellion: Zhu Yuanzhang saves Han Liner and moves the Song court west of Nanjing where it remains militarily insignificant
1365	autumn	Red Turban Rebellion: Zhu Yuanzhang attacks Zhang Shicheng
1365		Zhu Yuanzhang sets up a school with a teaching staff of "Erudites" (boshi)
1367	October	Red Turban Rebellion: Zhu Yuanzhang's army under Zhu Liangzi takes Taizhou
1367	1 October	Red Turban Rebellion: Zhu Yuanzhang takes Suzhou and Zhang Shicheng hangs himself; 2,400 large and small cannons are deployed by the Ming army at the siege of Suzhou.
1367	November	Red Turban Rebellion: Zhu Liangzi takes Wenzhou
1367	13 November	Red Turban Rebellion: Zhu Yuanzhang issues orders for Xu Da and Chang Yuchun to head north with 250,000 soldiers and Hu Mei, Tang He, and Liao Yongzhong to attack Fujian and Guangdong
1367	December	Red Turban Rebellion: Fang Guozhen surrenders to Zhu Yuanzhang
1367	28 December	Red Turban Rebellion: Hu Mei's forces take Shaowu
1367	28 December	Red Turban Rebellion: Xu Da and Chang Yuchun conquer Jinan
1367		Zhu Yuanzhang reestablishes the imperial examinations
1368	18 January	Red Turban Rebellion: Hu Mei captures Fuzhou

== 14th century ==
=== 1360s ===
Year	Date	Event
1368	23 January	Zhu Yuanzhang proclaims himself the Hongwu Emperor of the Ming dynasty (note that Ming and Qing use the era name rather than temple name)
1368	17 February	Ming forces conquer Fujian and capture Chen Youding, who is executed
1368	1 March	Ming forces conquer Shandong
1368	16 April	Ming forces capture Kaifeng
1368	18 April	Ming forces reach Guangzhou and receive He Zhen's surrender
1368	25 April	Ming forces defeat Köke Temür and capture Luoyang
1368	26 May	Ming forces capture Wuzhou
1368	July	Ming forces conquer Guangxi
1368	20 September	Ming forces capture Daidu (renamed Beiping) and the Yuan court flees to Inner Mongolia; so ends the Yuan dynasty
1368	November	Ming forces capture Baoding
1368	26 December	Ming forces capture Zhaozhou
1368	December	Ming forces capture Pingding
1368		Crouching-tiger cannons are employed by the Ming army.
1368		The Guozijian is created
1369	9 January	Ming forces capture Taiyuan
1369	3 March	Ming forces capture Datong
1369	March	Song Lian and Wang Yi start compiling the History of Yuan
1369	18 April	Ming forces conquer Shanxi and Li Siqi flees to Lintao
1369	21 May	Li Siqi surrenders to Ming forces
1369	23 May	Ming forces capture Lanzhou
1369	8 June	Ming forces capture Pingliang
1369	20 July	Ming forces capture Shangdu
1369	22 September	Ming forces capture Qingyang
1369		Construction of the Central Capital (Fengyang) begins

=== 1370s ===
Year	Date	Event
1370	January	Köke Temür lays siege to Lanzhou but fails to take it
1370		Ming forces defeat Köke Temür at Gongchang but fail to capture him
1370	5 June	The Hongwu Emperor authorizes the first Ming imperial examinations
1370	10 June	Ming forces capture Yingchang
1370	June	The Hongwu Emperor bans White Lotus and Manichaean sects
1370		Gunpowder is corned to strengthen the explosive power of land mines in the Ming dynasty.
1370		Cannon projectiles transition from stone to iron ammunition in the Ming dynasty.
1371	18 May	Ming forces capture Wenzhou
1371	July	Ming forces capture Hanzhou
1371	3 August	Ming Sheng surrenders Sichuan to the Ming dynasty
1371		Registered students at the Guozijian reach 3,728
1372	April	Ming forces defeat Köke Temür at the Tuul River
1372		Ming forces are routed at Karakorum
1372		Ming forces capture Yongchang and conquer Juyan
1372		Registered students at the Guozijian reach 10,000
1372		Cannons made specifically for naval usage appear in the Ming dynasty.
1373	March	The Hongwu Emperor suspends imperial examinations
1373	29 November	Ming forces defeat Köke Temür at Huairou
1373		The Hongwu Emperor limits tribute missions from Goryeo to once every three years
1373		Ming officials draw up the first "house law" in Chinese history
1375		Ming starts issuing a new note called the Da Ming Baochao
1375		The Hongwu Emperor halts constructions at Fengyang due to expenses and waste; construction plans shift to Nanjing
1376	March	Ming forces defeat Bayan Temür
1376	July	Ming forces defeat Bayan Temür again
1376	22 October	The Hongwu Emperor announces that he will accept straightforward criticism of his rule from officials
1376		Ye Boju is starved to death in prison for criticising the emperor's reliance on harsh punishment
1376		The Hongwu Emperor executes all officials connected to the "Case of the Pre-stamped Documents"
1377	May	Ming forces invade Qinghai
1377		Palace construction in Nanjing is completed and the city is designated "Jingshi" (Capital)
1378		Wu Mian rebellion: The Kam people rebel
1379	February	Ming forces defeat Tibetans in Gansu
1379		Champa sends tribute to Nanjing

=== 1380s ===
Year	Date	Event
1380		Hu Weiyong plots to assassinate the Hongwu Emperor but gets arrested; the ensuing investigations lead to the execution of roughly 15,000 people
1380		"Wasp nest" rocket launchers are manufactured for the Ming army.
1381	December	Ming conquest of Yunnan: Ming forces take Qujing
1382	April	Ming conquest of Yunnan: Ming forces conquer Yunnan
1384	April	The Hongwu Emperor relocates government agencies from the palace to outside the city walls of Nanjing
1385		Wu Mian rebellion: The Kam rebellion is defeated
1385		The imperial examinations are reestablished
1385		Guo Huan is executed for embezzling 7 million piculs of grain
1386	January	Ming–Mong Mao War: Si Lunfa of Mong Mao rebels
1387	October	Ming campaign against the Uriankhai: Naghachu surrenders to Ming forces
1388	May	Battle of Buir Lake: Ming forces defeat Uskhal Khan Tögüs Temür
1388		Ming–Mong Mao War: Mong Mao is defeated by the Ming artillery corps utilizing volley fire
1389	January	Ming forces defeat Yi rebels in Yuezhou
1389	December	Ming–Mong Mao War: Si Lunfa surrenders to the Ming dynasty

=== 1390s ===
Year	Date	Event
1390	April	Nayir Bukha and Yaozhu surrender to Ming forces
1391	May	Ajashiri rebels and is suppressed
1391		Ming forces briefly occupy Hami and retreat
1392	5 August	Yi Songgye ousts Wang Yo and becomes Taejo of Joseon; so ends Goguryeo
1393		Ming forces sack Hami
1394		Tributary relations between Ming and Joseon are normalized
1396	April	Ming forces defeat Bolin Temür
1397	October	Lin Kuan rebellion: A Kam rebellion is defeated
1397	December	Ming–Mong Mao Intervention: Si Lunfa is deposed and requests Ming aid in restoring him to power
1398	January	Ming–Mong Mao Intervention: Si Lunfa is restored to power
1398	24 May	The Hongwu Emperor becomes ill
1398	24 June	The Hongwu Emperor dies
1398	30 June	Zhu Yunwen becomes the Jianwen Emperor
1398		The Jianwen Emperor eliminates the princedoms of Zhu Gui, Zhu Bo, Zhu Fu, and Zhu Pian
1398		Last recorded instance of human sacrifice in China
1399	June	The Jianwen Emperor returns Zhu Di's sons
1399	July	A military official seizes two of Zhu Di's junior officials on the charge of sedition
1399	5 August	Jingnan Campaign: Zhu Di launches an offensive on neighboring counties
1399	25 September	Jingnan Campaign: Zhu Di defeats a 130,000 strong army sent by the Jianwen Emperor
1399	12 November	Jingnan Campaign: The Jianwen Emperor's forces lay siege to Beiping but are forced to retreat three weeks later

== 15th century ==
=== 1400s ===
Year	Date	Event
1400	January	Jingnan Campaign: Zhu Di invades Shanxi
1400	18 May	Jingnan Campaign: Zhu Di's forces deal heavy casualties upon the imperial army
1400	8 June	Jingnan Campaign: Zhu Di lays siege to Dezhou
1400	4 September	Jingnan Campaign: Zhu Di lifts the siege of Dezhou and returns to Beiping
1401	9 January	Jingnan Campaign: Zhu Di's forces fall to explosives and suffer heavy casualties in Shandong, forcing their retreat
1401	5 April	Jingnan Campaign: Zhu Di's forces deal a heavy defeat to the imperial army near Dezhou
1401	August	Jingnan Campaign: The imperial army forces Zhu Di to retreat north to Beiping
1401	August	The Jianwen Emperor restricts the size of Buddhist and Taoist landholdings
1401	October	Jingnan Campaign: Imperial forces are expelled from the Beiping region
1402	January	Jingnan Campaign: Zhu Di conquers northwestern Shandong
1402	3 March	Jingnan Campaign: Zhu Di takes Xuzhou
1402	April	Jingnan Campaign: Zhu Di defeats imperial troops in Suzhou
1402	23 May	Jingnan Campaign: Zhu Di is repulsed by imperial troops in Anhui
1402	28 May	Jingnan Campaign: Zhu Di defeats imperial forces at Lingbi
1402	7 June	Jingnan Campaign: Zhu Di's forces cross the Huai River
1402	17 June	Jingnan Campaign: Zhu Di takes Yangzhou
1402	1 July	Jingnan Campaign: Zhu Di is stopped at the Changjiang across from Nanjing
1402	3 July	Jingnan Campaign: Assistant chief commissioner Chen Xuan defects to Zhu Di and rebel forces cross the Changjiang
1402	13 July	Jingnan Campaign: Zhu Hui opens the Jinchuan Gate of Nanjing to lets Zhu Di in without a fight; the Jianwen Emperor disappears and his family is incarcerated
1402	17 July	Zhu Di ascends the throne as the Yongle Emperor
1402	September	The Yongle Emperor commissions the Yongle Encyclopedia
1403	February	The Yongle Emperor designates Beiping the "Northern Capital", Beijing
1403	April	The Yongle Emperor settles loyal Uriankhai near Daning
1403	4 September	Treasure voyages: Orders are issued for the construction of 200 "seagoing transport ships"
1403	December	The Yongle Emperor creates the Jianzhou Guard
1403		Japanese missions to Ming China: Ashikaga Yoshimitsu sends an embassy to the Ming dynasty declaring himself "your subject, the King of Japan", and receives trading privileges
1404	March	Treasure voyages: Orders are issued for the construction of 50 "seagoing ships"
1404	July	Engke Temiir of Kara Del receives the title of prince from the Ming court
1404	October	Trần Thiêm Bình arrives in Nanjing and requests the Ming dynasty to restore him to the throne of the Trần dynasty
1404	December	Tamerlane launches an invasion of the Ming dynasty but dies on the way
1404		Empirewide imperial examinations are resumed
1404		10,000 households from Shanxi are relocated to Beijing
1405	11 July	Treasure voyages: Zheng He and 27,800 men depart from Nanjing on 255 ships, of which 62 are treasure ships, "bearing imperial letters to the countries of the Western Ocean and with gifts to their kings of gold brocade, patterned silks, and colored silk gauze, according to their status."
1405		Construction of new palace buildings in Beijing begins
1406	4 April	Trần Thiêm Bình and his Ming escort are ambushed and killed while crossing into Lạng Sơn
1406	19 November	Ming–Hồ War: Ming forces invade Đại Ngu
1406	13 December	Ming–Hồ War: Ming forces capture Đa Bang and Thăng Long
1406		Treasure voyages: Treasure fleet visits Malacca and Java before heading up the Straits of Malacca to Aru, Samudera Pasai Sultanate, and Lambri, where the people are described as "very honest and genuine," and from there 3 days to the Andaman Islands, and then 8 more days to the west coast of Ceylon where the king reacts with hostility. The fleet departs for Calicut, which is described as "the Great country of the Western Ocean"
1407		Treasure voyages: Treasure fleet defeats Chen Zuyi's pirate fleet at Palembang and installs Shi Jinqing as "grand chieftain ruling over the native people of that place"
1407	13 March	Ming–Đại Ngu (Hồ dynasty) War: Hồ Quý Ly's counteroffensive against Ming forces fails
1407	April	Deshin Shekpa, 5th Karmapa Lama arrives in Nanjing to perform religious ceremonies
1407	16 June	Ming–Đại Ngu (Hồ dynasty) War: Hồ Quý Ly and his son are captured and sent to Nanjing
1407	5 July	Fourth Chinese domination of Vietnam: The Yongle Emperor announces the formal incorporation of Jiaozhi into the Ming dynasty
1407	2 October	Treasure voyages: Chinese Treasure fleet arrives back at Nanjing
1407	5 October	Treasure voyages: Wang Hao is ordered to refit 249 "sea transport ships" in "preparation for embassies to the countries of the Western Ocean"
1407	23 October	Treasure voyages: The Yongle Emperor issues orders for the second voyage and to confer formal investiture on the king of Calicut
1407	23 October	Treasure voyages: The Yongle Emperor summons Javanese envoys to demand restitution for killing 710 Chinese and settles for 10,000 ounces of gold
1407	30 October	Treasure voyages: A eunuch Grand Director departs with an imperial letter for the king of Champa
1407		Treasure voyages: Zheng He departs with a fleet of 249 ships and takes a route similar to the first voyage with the addition of stops at Jiayile, Abobadan, Ganbali, Quilon, and Cochin
1407	December	The Yongle Encyclopedia is completed
1407		Ironwood wadding is added to Ming cannons, increasing their effectiveness.
1408	14 February	Treasure voyages: Orders for the construction of 48 treasure ships are issued from the Ministry of Works in Nanjing
1408	5 July	Fourth Chinese domination of Vietnam: Ming troops seize 13,600,000 tons of rice; 235,900 cattles and livestock and vast amounts of materials in Vietnam
1408	September	Fourth Chinese domination of Vietnam: Trần Ngỗi rebels in Jiaozhi
1409	January	Treasure voyages: Orders are issued for the third voyage
1409	15 February	Treasure voyages: The Galle Trilingual Inscription is produced
1409	June	Oirats receives princely titles from the Ming court
1409	summer	Treasure voyages: Treasure fleet returns to China
1409	23 September	Battle of Kherlen: Ming forces are defeated by Öljei Temür Khan
1409	October	Treasure voyages: Zheng He departs with 27,000 men, taking the usual route
1409	December	Fourth Chinese domination of Vietnam: Ming forces capture Trần Ngỗi but Trần Quý Khoáng becomes leader of the rebels

=== 1410s ===
Year	Date	Event
1410	15 June	First Mongol Campaign: The Yongle Emperor defeats Öljei Temür Khan on the banks of the Onon River
1410	July	First Mongol Campaign: Ming forces defeat Arughtai east of the Greater Khingan and withdraw to Nanjing
1410		Ming–Kotte War: Treasure fleet lands at Galle in Ceylon and captures King Vijayabahu VI of the Kingdom of Gampola
1411	July	Dredging and reconstruction of the Grand Canal begins
1411	6 July	Treasure voyages: Treasure fleet returns to Nanjing
1411		The Yongle Emperor sends Yishiha to explore northern Manchuria
1411		Ashikaga Yoshimochi refuses the Yongle Emperor's request to suppress Japanese pirates
1412	18 December	Treasure voyages:The Yongle Emperor issues orders for the fourth voyage
1412		Shells are used as ammunition in the Ming dynasty.
1413	autumn	Treasure voyages: Zheng He departs from Nanjingand takes the usual route with the addition of four new destinations: the Maldives, Bitra, Chetlat Island, and Hormuz, which is given the following description: "Foreign ships from every place, together with foreign merchants traveling by land, all come to this territory in order to gather together and buy and sell, and therefore the people of this country are all rich"
1413		Lopön Chenpo Gushri Lodrö Gyaltsen visits Nanjing
1413		Yongning Temple Stele: Ming dynasty sends Yishiha to the Nurgan Regional Military Commission to create postal stations and spread Buddhism
1414	30 March	Fourth Chinese domination of Vietnam: Trần Quý Khoáng is captured
1414	April	Second Mongol Campaign: Ming forces engage Oirats at the Tuul River, suffering heavy casualties, but ultimately prevail through the use of heavy cannon bombardments
1414		Chöje Shakya Yeshe visits Nanjing
1415		Treasure voyages: Treasure fleet captures Sekandar, a rebel against Zain al-'Abidin, king of the Samudera Pasai Sultanate
1415	June	The Grand Canal is reconstructed
1415	12 August	Treasure voyages: Treasure fleet arrives back in Nanjing
1415	13 August	Treasure voyages: Zheng He's colleague is sent on a mission bearing gifts to Bengal
1416	19 November	Treasure voyages: The Yongle Emperor bestows gifts upon ambassadors from 18 countries
1416	19 December	Treasure voyages: The Yongle Emperor issues orders for the fifth voyage
1417		Lam Sơn uprising: Lê Lợi leads an insurrection against the Ming dynasty
1417	autumn	Treasure voyages: Zheng He departs China taking the previous route to Hormuz, and then Aden, Mogadishu, Barawa, Zhubu, and Malindi
1419	8 August	Treasure voyages: Treasure fleet returns to China
1419	20 September	Treasure voyages: Ambassadors present exotic animals to the Ming court including a giraffe imported from Somalia by Bengalis
1419	2 October	Treasure voyages: Orders are issued for the construction of 41 Treasure ships
1419		During the Lantern Festival, the Ming imperial palace puts on a display of pyrotechnics involving rockets running along wires which light up lanterns, illuminating the palace.

=== 1420s ===
Year	Date	Event
1420		Forbidden City: Construction of the Altar of Heaven is completed
1420	28 October	Beijing officially becomes the capital of the Ming dynasty
1421	3 March	Treasure voyages: Orders are issued for the sixth voyage and envoys from 16 countries including Hormuz are given gifts of paper and coin money, and ceremonial robes and linings
1421	14 May	Treasure voyages: The Yongle Emperor orders the suspension of the Treasure voyages
1421	10 November	Treasure voyages: Orders are issued to Zheng He to provide Hong Bao and envoys from 16 countries passage back to their countries; the Treasure fleet takes its usual route to Ceylon where it splits up and heads for the Maldives, Hormuz, and the Arabian states of Djofar, Lasa, and Aden, and the two African states of Mogadishu and Barawa; Zheng He visits Ganbali
1422		Treasure voyages: Treasure fleet regroups at Samudera Pasai Sultanate and visit Siam before heading back to China
1422	April	Third Mongol Campaign: Ming forces are dispatched against Arughtai but fail to engage him in combat and return to Beijing
1422	3 September	Treasure voyages: Treasure fleet returns to China bringing envoys from Siam, Samudera Pasai Sultanate, and Aden
1423	August	Fourth Mongol Campaign: The Yongle Emperor launches an offensive against Arughtai only to find out he had already been defeated by the Oirats
1424	27 February	Treasure voyages: Zheng He is sent on a diplomatic mission to Palembang to confer "a gauze cap, a ceremonial robe with floral gold woven into gold patterns in the silk, and a silver seal" on Shi Jinqing's son Shi Jisun
1424	April	Fifth Mongol Campaign: The Yongle Emperor leads an expedition against the remnants of Arughtai's horde but fails to find them
1424	12 August	The Yongle Emperor dies
1424	7 September	Treasure voyages: Zhu Gaozhi becomes the Hongxi Emperor and terminates the Treasure voyages
1424		Metropolitan graduates fill posts down to the county magistrate
1425	29 May	The Hongxi Emperor dies
1425	27 June	Zhu Zhanji becomes the Xuande Emperor
1425	2 September	Zhu Gaoxu rebels
1425	22 September	Zhu Gaoxu is defeated
1426		Ming dynasty sends Yishiha to the Wild Jurchens to construct shipyards and warehouses
1426	5 October	Lam Sơn uprising: Lê Lợi's forces inflict heavy casualties on Ming attacks in Battle of Tốt Động – Chúc Động
1426	winter	Lam Sơn uprising: Lam Sơn forces drive out the Ming army from most of the Red River Delta and Northern Vietnam
1427	10 October	Lam Sơn uprising: Ming reinforcements are encircled and defeated in Lạng Sơn
1427	14 December	Lam Sơn uprising: Ming forces are withdrawn from Jiaozhi
1428	25 March	Treasure voyages: The Xuande Emperor orders Zheng He to supervise the reconstruction of the Great Baoen Temple
1428	29 April	Lê Lợi reestablished the kingdom of Đại Việt under Later Lê dynasty
1428	October	Uriankhai raid Ming borders and the Xuande Emperor personally leads troops to repel them
1429		The Xuande Emperor conducts a major military review on the outskirts of Beijing
1429		Mounted infantry carrying hand cannons are employed by the Ming army.

=== 1430s ===
Year	Date	Event
1430	May	The Xuande Emperor orders a tax reduction on all imperial lands
1430	29 June	Treasure voyages: The Xuande Emperor issues orders for the seventh voyage
1431	19 January	Treasure voyages: Treasure fleet departs from Nanjing
1431	14 March	Treasure voyages: Liujiagang Inscription is erected
1431	12 June	Vietnamese emperor Lê Thái Tổ of the Lê dynasty offers a nominate tributary relation with Ming China and was titled King of Annam by the Ming emperor.
1431	December	Treasure voyages: The Changle Inscription is erected and the fleet departs from Changle
1432	12 September	Treasure voyages: Treasure fleet arrives at Samudera Pasai Sultanate and Hong Bao and Ma Huan detach from the fleet to visit Bengal
1432		Ming dynasty sends Yishiha to present seals to Ming-allied Jurchens and to repair the Yongning Temple
1433		Treasure voyages: Zheng He dies
1433		Treasure voyages: Hong Bao and Ma Huan arrive in Calicut and send seven men to Mecca while Hong Bao visits Djofar, Lasa, Aden, Mogadishu, and Barawa before heading back to China
1433	9 March	Treasure voyages: Treasure fleet departs from Hormuz and heads back to China
1433	June	Japanese missions to Ming China: Relations between Ming and Japan are renewed
1433	7 July	Treasure voyages: Treasure fleet arrives back in China
1433	14 September	Treasure voyages: Envoys from Samudera Pasai Sultanate, Calicut, Cochin, Ceylon, Djofar, Aden, Coimbatore, Hormuz, Kayal, and Mecca present tribute
1433		Treasure voyages: Ma Huan publishes his Yingya Shenglan
1434		Treasure voyages: Gong Zhen publishes his Xiyang Fanguo Zhi
1435	31 January	The Xuande Emperor dies and Empress Zhang (Hongxi) becomes regent for the Zhengtong Emperor
1435		The Northern China Plain and Shandong suffer from drought and plagues
1436		Treasure voyages: Ming dynasty bans building seagoing ships
1436		Treasure voyages: Fei Xin publishes his Xingcha Shenglan
1436		Flooding strikes northern Jiangsu, the Northern China Plain and Shandong
1437		Shanxi and Shaanxi experience drought
1437		Flooding strikes northern Jiangsu
1438	8 December	Luchuan–Pingmian campaigns: Ming carries out a punitive expedition against Si Renfa of Mong Mao for attacking neighboring tusi, but fails to defeat him
1439		Flooding strikes the northern China Plain and Shandong

=== 1440s ===
Year	Date	Event
1440		Flooding strikes Suzhou, Jiangnan, the northern China Plain and Shandong
1440		Famine strikes Zhejiang
1441	27 February	Luchuan–Pingmian campaigns: Ming forces attack Mong Mao
1441		Flooding strikes the northern China Plain and Shandong
1441		Famine strikes Zhejiang
1442	January	Luchuan–Pingmian campaigns: Mong Mao is defeated but Si Renfa escapes to Ava
1442	20 November	Empress Zhang (Hongxi) dies
1443	March	Luchuan–Pingmian campaigns: Ming forces defeat Si Jifa but fail to capture him
1444		Famine strikes Shanxi and Shaanxi
1444		Flooding strikes northern Jiangsu
1445	August	Luchuan–Pingmian campaigns: Ava hands over Si Renfa to Ming in return for their support in attacking Hsenwi
1445		Drought and a plague epidemic strike Zhejiang
1446	January	Luchuan–Pingmian campaigns: Si Renfa is executed.
1446		Floods strike Jiangnan
1447		Ye Zongliu rebels with a group of silver miners in Zhejiang
1447		Famine strikes northern Jiangsu
1448	March	Deng Maoqi rebels with a group of tenant farmers northwest of the Fujian and Jiangxi border
1448	December	Ming forces kill Ye Zongliu, but his rebels remain intact and retreat further south to siege Chuzhou
1448		1448 Yellow River flood: Yellow River dikes burst
1448		Drought and locust plague strike northwest China
1448		Drought strikes Jiangnan
1449	March	Luchuan–Pingmian campaigns: Ming forces invade Mong Yang for harboring Si Jifa, but he manages to escape again
1449	May	Deng Maoqi's rebels are defeated
1449	July	Tumu Crisis: Esen Taishi of the Oirats and de facto ruler of the Northern Yuan launches an invasion of the Ming dynasty
1449	4 August	Tumu Crisis: The Zhengtong Emperor departs from Beijing to personally confront Esen Taishi
1449	30 August	Tumu Crisis: The Ming rearguard is defeated
1449	August	Ye Zongliu's rebels are defeated
1449	1 September	Tumu Crisis: The Ming army is annihilated and the Zhengtong Emperor is captured by Esen Taishi
1449	23 September	Zhu Qiyu becomes the Jingtai Emperor
1449	27 October	Esen Taishi lays siege to Beijing but fails to take it and withdraws after 5 days
1449		Yellow River dikes burst again causing the river to change course slightly

=== 1450s ===
Year	Date	Event
1450	19 September	The Zhengtong Emperor is released and arrives back in Beijing, where he is kept under house arrest by the Jingtai Emperor
1450		Yao and Miao people rebel in Guizhou and Huguang
1450		Famine strikes Shandong
1452		1452 Yellow River floods: Yellow River dikes burst
1452		Yao and Miao rebels are suppressed
1452		Northern China experiences flooding
1454		Unusually heavy snowfall causes starvation in Suzhou and Hanzhou
1455		Xu Youzhen finishes repairs on the Yellow Riverdikes
1455		Widespread drought affects Central China
1456		Miao people in Huguang rebel and are suppressed
1457	11 February	The former emperor is reinstated by the military and becomes the Tianshun Emperor

=== 1460s ===
Year	Date	Event
1461	7 August	Rebellion of Cao Qin: Cao Qin rebels and tries to storm Beijing but gets arrested and is forced to commit suicide
1464	23 February	The Tianshun Emperor dies and Zhu Qianshen becomes the Chenghua Emperor
1464		Hou Dagou of the Yao people rebels in Guangxi
1464		Treasure voyages: Documents of the treasure voyages are removed from the archives of the Ministry of War and destroyed by Liu Daxia on the basis that they were "deceitful exaggerations of bizarre things far removed from the testimony of people's ears and eyes," and that "the expeditions of Sanbao to the Western Ocean wasted tens of myriads of money and grain, and moreover the people who met their deaths [on these expeditions] may be counted in the myriads. Although he returned with wonderful precious things, what benefit was it to the state? This was merely an action of bad government of which ministers should severely disapprove. Even if the old archives were still preserved they should be destroyed in order to suppress [a repetition of these things] at the root."
1466	January	Ming forces defeat and capture Hou Dagou but the rebellion continues anyway
1466		The Ming execute Dongshan of the Left Jianzhou Guard
1466		Miao people rebel in Hunan as well as the Sichuan-Guizhou border and are suppressed
1466		Liu Tong rebels near Xiangyang and is defeated
1467		A Ming-Joseon expedition defeats the Jianzhou Jurchens and kill Li Manzhu
1468	May	Mongols rebel at Guyuan
1468	12 May	1,000 Vietnamese troops occupy the border town Pingxiang, Guangxi
1469		The Mongol rebellion at Guyuan is suppressed

=== 1470s ===
Year	Date	Event
1470		The governor of Liaodong, Chen Yue, attacks the Jurchens and demands bribes from Jurchen embassies
1470		Remnants of Liu Tong's rebels rebel again
1471		Liu Tong's rebels are defeated
1473		Ming forces launch an attack on Hami in conjunction with Mongol allies but retreat when the Mongols abandon them
1474		Yu Zijun directs the reconstruction and extension of the Great Wall of China to seal off Ordos from the south
1475		Miao people rebel in Hunan and are suppressed
1476	June	Vagrant population around Xiangyang rebel until the government allows them to claim lands with reduced taxes
1479		Miao people rebel in Sichuan
1479	28 April	Vietnamese emperor Lê Hạo of the Lê dynasty sends gold, silver utensils, local silk products to the Chinese court as gifts

=== 1480s ===
Year	Date	Event
1485		Number of eunuchs passes 10,000
1487	1 September	The Chenghua Emperor falls ill
1487	9 September	The Chenghua Emperor dies
1487	17 September	Zhu Youtang becomes the Hongzhi Emperor

=== 1490s ===
Year	Date	Event
1492		Europe reaches parity with China in health, fertility rate, life expectancy, and human capital
1494		1494 Yellow River flood: Yellow River floods but Liu Daxia successfully directs the river to flow south of Shandong, stabilizing the course of the Yellow River until the 19th century
1494		National military reforms switch to recruiting volunteers for local units
1495		Ming forces briefly occupy Hami before reinforcements from Turpan force them to retreat
1496		Japanese missions to Ming China: Japanese envoys kill several people on their return trip from Beijing
1499		A trade embargo on Turpan forces them to return Hami to Uyghur control
1499		Yi people rebel in Guizhou

== 16th century ==
=== 1500s ===
Year	Date	Event
1500		Li people rebel on Hainan
1502		Yi rebels in Guizhou are suppressed
1503		Li rebels are suppressed
1504		Datong is raided by Mongols
1505	8 June	The Hongzhi Emperor dies
1505	19 June	Zhu Houzhao becomes the Zhengde Emperor
1505		The Zhengde Emperor starts using eunuchs as military and fiscal intendants
1506	May	The Ministry of Revenue is ordered to investigate the lack of revenue
1506	July	The Minister of Revenue, Han Wen, complains about the emperor's expenditures using the ministerial treasuries
1506	28 October	The Minister of Revenue petitions the emperor to execute all the eunuchs in his personal employ, but the emperor refuses, and as a result all the grand secretaries resign
1506		The Zhengde Emperor takes to wandering the streets of Beijing in disguise
1507	September	350,000 ounces of silver are spent on lanterns for the Lantern Festival
1509	August	Two garrisons in Liaodong revolt and are quelled after 2,500 ounces of silver are distributed among them

=== 1510s ===
Year	Date	Event
1510	12 May	Prince of Anhua rebellion: Zhu Zhifan rebels in Shanxi
1510	30 May	Prince of Anhua rebellion: Zhu Zhifan is captured
1510		Dayan Khan conquers the Ordos Loop
1511	February	Bandits around Beijing revolt
1511	October	Bandits burn imperial grain carriages around Beijing
1511		Capture of Malacca (1511): The Malacca Sultanate sends a plea for help against the Portuguese
1512	January	Bandits attack Bazhou
1512	7 September	The bandit armies are defeated
1514	10 February	Gunpowder tents in the palace courtyard catch fire and destroy the residential palaces
1514	September	The Zhengde Emperor is badly mauled by a tiger
1515	summer	30,000 troops from the capital garrisons and Imperial Bodyguard are dispatched to rebuild the palaces
1517	16 October	Dayan Khan raids the Ming dynasty
1517	20 October	The Zhengde Emperor repels Dayan Khan's raiding party
1517		Tomé Pires arrives at Guangzhou
1518	January	The Zhengde Emperor imprisons the court at Beijing for not giving him enough money
1519	9 July	Prince of Ning rebellion: Zhu Chenhao rebels in Jiangxi
1519	13 July	Prince of Ning rebellion: Rebel forces capture Jiujiang
1519	23 July	Prince of Ning rebellion: Rebel forces lay siege to Anqing
1519	9 August	Prince of Ning rebellion: Rebel forces lift the siege on Anqing
1519	13 August	Prince of Ning rebellion: Imperial forces capture Nanchang
1519	15 August	Prince of Ning rebellion: Zhu Chenhao's army is defeated
1519	20 August	Prince of Ning rebellion: Zhu Chenhao flees from his fleet and is captured

=== 1520s ===
Year	Date	Event
1520	January	The Zhengde Emperor forbids the slaughtering of pigs
1520	May	The Portuguese bribe a eunuch official in Guangzhou to let them through and Tomé Pires' party arrive at Nanjing
1521	20 April	The Zhengde Emperor dies
1521	21 April	Tomé Pires' party is expelled from Beijing
1521	27 April	Zhu Houcong becomes the Jiajing Emperor
1521	May	Battle of Tunmen: Ming forces expel a Portuguese fleet from Tunmen when they refuse to leave
1521		Palace reconstruction is completed
1522		Portuguese are forbidden from trading in Guangzhou
1522		Battle of Shancaowan: A Portuguese fleet runs a Ming blockade near Lantau Island and manages to leave with heavy casualties
1523	May	Ningbo incident: The Hosokawa trade mission attacks the Ouchi trade mission and loots Ningbo, seizes ships, and kills a Ming commander before setting sail; the Chinese tributary system loses maritime trade value
1523		The Ming dynasty produces breech-loading swivel guns based on Portuguese designs.
1524	August	The garrison of Datong rebels
1524		Ming–Turpan conflict: Turpan attacks Ganzhou and is repelled
1525	April	The Datong rebels are defeated
1525		Jiajing wokou raids: Shuangyu becomes a trading enclave
1525		Some merchants from Fujian are able to speak Formosan languages
1526		Famine strikes Beijing
1527		Floods sweep through Huguang
1528		Ming–Turpan conflict: Turpan's trading privileges are restored
1529		Jiajing wokou raids: Several commanders at Wenzhou are exiled for consorting with pirates
1529		An inauspicious comet is sighted

=== 1530s ===
Year	Date	Event
1531		Datong comes under raid by Mongols
1531		An inauspicious comet is sighted
1532		Jiajing wokou raids: The governor of Guangzhou is recalled for failing to eradicate pirates
1532		A really inauspicious comet is sighted
1533	24 October	The Datong garrison rebels and is suppressed
1534		Jiajing wokou raids: A pirate with over 50 large ships under his command is captured
1534		The Jiajing Emperor stops attending routine court audiences
1535		The garrisons at Liaodong and Guangning revolt and are suppressed
1536		Mongols raid Shanxi but are repelled
1537		Mongols raid Datong
1539		Japanese missions to Ming China: Japanese envoys are apprehended and forbidden from trading upon reaching China
1539		The garrison at Liaodong rebels and is suppressed

=== 1540s ===
Year	Date	Event
1540	September	The Jiajing Emperor announces his intention to seclude himself for several years to pursue immortality; a court official says this is nonsense and gets tortured to death
1541	30 April	A fire destroys the Imperial Ancestral Temple compound.
1541	October	Altan Khan raids Shaanxi.
1541		Gunpowder is used for hydraulic engineering in the Ming dynasty.
1542	July	Altan Khan raids Shaanxi again.
1542	4 August	Ming forces are defeated by Altan Khan at Guangwu.
1542	8 August	Altan Khan pillages the suburbs of Taiyuan.
1542		Renyin palace rebellion: Consort Fang prevents an assassination on the Jiajing Emperor.
1542		The Jiajing Emperor withdraws from his formal duties completely and spends the remainder of his life in the Palace of Everlasting Longevity obsessed with physical immortality through drugs, rituals, and esoteric physical regimens.
1543	December	Construction on a new Imperial Ancestral Temple begins.
1543		Famine strikes Zhejiang.
1544		Japanese missions to Ming China: Ming officials refuse to meet with Japanese envoys.
1544		Famine strikes Zhejiang again.
1545	January	An outbreak of pestilence occurs in Beijing.
1545	April	Dust storms destroy winter wheat and barley crops.
1545	July	The new Imperial Ancestral Temple is completed.
1545		Datong rebels and is suppressed.
1545		Japanese missions to Ming China: Wang Zhi returns to Japan with the Japanese mission and leads a trade mission to Shuangyu.
1547		Jiajing wokou raids: A censor reports that piracy on the southeast coast is out of control.
1548	February	Jiajing wokou raids: Pirates raid Ningbo and Taizhou.
1548	April	Jiajing wokou raids: Ming forces attack Shuangyu but many of the ships in the harbor escape.
1548	June	Mongols defeat Ming forces at Xuanfu.
1548	October	Mongols raid Huailai.
1548		The Ming army starts fielding matchlocks.
1549	March	Altan Khan defeats Ming forces at Xuanfu but suffers heavy casualties.
1549	March	Jiajing wokou raids: Ming forces attack a large merchant fleet anchored off the coast of southern Fujian.

=== 1550s ===
Year	Date	Event
1550	1 October	Altan Khan pillages the suburbs of Beijing
1550	6 October	Ming forces are defeated by Mongols
1550		Towns and villages in Zhejiang erect palisades in response to brigands
1551		Fishing boats are forbidden from going out to sea
1552	April	Ming forces are defeated by Mongols north of Datong
1552		Jiajing wokou raids: Raiding parties attack the coast of Zhejiang
1552		The Jiajing Emperor selects 800 girls between the ages of 8 and 14 for palace service
1553		Jiajing wokou raids: Wang Zhi raids the coast of Zhejiang north of Taizhou
1554	spring	Serious epidemics break out in Beijing
1554	March	Jiajing wokou raids: Pirates kill the magistrate of Songjiang and occupy Chongming Island
1554		Luso-Chinese agreement (1554): Leonel de Sousa bribes the vice-commissioner of maritime defense into letting the Portuguese stay at Macau for an annual payment of 500 taels and 20 percent imperial duty on half their products
1555		Jiajing wokou raids: Pirates attack Hangzhou
1555	May	Jiajing wokou raids: Ming forces defeat a large raiding party north of Jiaxing
1555		The Jiajing Emperor selects 180 girls under the age of 10 for palace service
1556	January	1556 Shaanxi earthquake: An earthquake devastates Shaanxi, with over 800,000 reported dead
1556		Jiajing wokou raids: Pirates raid the entire coastline from Nanjing to Hangzhou
1556		The Jiajing Emperor asks the Ministry of Rites to find some magical plants to make him immortal
1557	May	The three main audience halls in the Forbidden City are destroyed in a fire
1557	winter	Sengge, son of Altan Khan, lays siege to a garrison near Datong
1558	April	Jiajing wokou raids: Pirates raid Zhejiang and northern Fujian
1558		Sengge retreats upon the arrival of reinforcements
1558		The Ministry of Rites presents 1,860 magical plants to the Jiajing Emperor
1558		Imperial treasuries fall to less than 200,000 ounces of silver
1559	summer	Qi Jiguang begins applying his tactical reforms on newly recruited soldiers
1559		A drought causes starvation in the Changjiang River Delta
1559	December	The Suzhou garrison mutinies
1559		Jiajing wokou raids: Pirates take over Kinmen Island (Quemoy) and launch raids into Fujian and Guangdong

=== 1560s ===
Year	Date	Event
1560	March	The Nanjing garrison rebels in response to cuts in rations until they're given 40,000 ounces of silver
1560		The Jiajing Emperor suffers from insomnia
1560		Qi Jiguang publishes his Jixiao Xinshu describing the musket volley fire technique and his experience training the Ming army in its use.
1561	December	The Forbidden City 's residential palace is destroyed in a fire
1561		The Ming dynasty starts producing portable breech-loading firearms.
1562	June	The Forbidden City 's residential palace is rebuilt
1562	December	Jiajing wokou raids: Pirates capture Xinghua
1563	May	Jiajing wokou raids: Ming forces retake Xinghua and destroy pirate bases in Fujian
1563		Pirate Lin Daoqian retreats to southwestern Taiwan after being chased by Ming naval forces
1563		A walled town is built in Penghu on the orders of a Ming general
1564		Eunuchs drop peaches into the Jiajing Emperor's bed and tell him they fell from heaven
1564		The Jiajing Emperor reduces all imperial clansmen to commoner status in response to their demand for stipends
1565		The Jiajing Emperor becomes ill
1566		Jiajing wokou raids: Ming forces eradicate pirates in Jiangxi and Guangdong
1567	23 January	The Jiajing Emperor dies
1567	4 February	Zhu Zaihou becomes the Longqing Emperor
1567		The ban on overseas trading is lifted

=== 1570s ===
Year	Date	Event
1570		Wang Gao of the Jianzhou Guard raids Ming settlements
1572	5 July	The Longqing Emperor dies
1572	19 July	Zhu Yijun becomes the Wanli Emperor
1573		Spanish trade with China begins in Yuegang
1574		Li Chengliang kills Wang Gao with the help of Giocangga and Taksi
1574		A wall is erected around Macau
1575		Wang Wanggao, a Ming naval officer, arrives at Luzon and returns with a Spanish embassy headed by Martín de Rada; the embassy fails due to the Spanish inability to capture Lin Feng, a Chinese pirate
1576		The China-America trade is established
1578		Portuguese are allowed to travel to Guangzhou
1579		Donglin movement: All private Donglin Academies are shut down

=== 1580s ===
Year	Date	Event
1580		Single whip law: Tax laws are simplified
1580		Officials criticize the Wanli Emperor for negligence and the questionable propriety of his personal life
1582		Ming forces defeat Atai of the Jianzhou Jurchens, and accidentally kill Giocangga and Taksi, grandfather and father of Nurhaci
1582		The Taicang Treasury accumulates over 6 million taels of silver
1582		A Gregorian calendar more accurate than the Chinese calendar is produced in Europe
1583		Matteo Ricci sets up a church in Zhaoqing
1589		Bozhou rebellion: Miao people rebel in Bozhou

=== 1590s ===
Year	Date	Event
1590		Chinese from Fujian start settling in southwestern Taiwan
1592	March	Ordos Campaign: Liu Dongyang and Pubei rebel in Ningxia
1592	14 July	Ordos Campaign: Ye Mengxiong brings cannons and additional Miao troops to the siege of Ningxia
1592	23 August	Ordos Campaign: Dikes around Ningxia are completed
1592	6 September	Ordos Campaign: Ningxia is flooded
1592	25 September	Ordos Campaign: Rebels make one last attempt to break out of Ningxia
1592	12 October	Ordos Campaign: The north wall collapses and the rebellion is defeated
1592		Japanese invasions of Korea (1592–98): Ming forces mobilize to intervene in the Japanese invasion of Joseon
1592		Japanese invasions of Korea (1592–98): Nurhaci offers to fight the Japanese but is refused; Ming reacts with alarm to the size and quality of Nurhaci's troops
1593	8 January	Siege of Pyongyang (1593): Ming and Joseon forces evict Japanese troops from Pyeongyang
1593	27 January	Battle of Byeokjegwan: An advance Ming scout party is defeated by Japanese forces
1593		Expansion of the Jia Canal begins
1593		Middle and junior grade assignments are assigned by drawing lots
1593		Ming officials issue ten licenses each year for Chinese junks to trade in northern Taiwan
1594		Bozhou rebellion: Ming forces are defeated in Sichuan
1596		The Wanli Emperor dispatches eunuchs as tax collectors and mining intendants
1597	17 October	Battle of Jiksan: The Japanese advance towards Hanseong is halted by Ming forces
1598	4 January	Siege of Ulsan: Ming and Joseon forces fail to evict the Japanese from Ulsan Castle
1598	October	Battle of Sacheon (1598): Ming and Joseon forces fail to evict the Japanese from Sacheon
1598	7 October	Siege of Suncheon: Ming and Joseon forces fail to evict the Japanese from Suncheon Castle
1598	16 December	Battle of Noryang: Ming and Joseon naval forces defeat the Japanese fleet
1598	24 December	Japanese invasions of Korea (1592–98): Japanese forces withdraw from Korea
1598		Bozhou rebellion: The Miao rebellion is suppressed
1598		Mongols kill Li Rusong, the Ming commander-in-chief
1598		Ming cavalry experiments with firing a three-barreled matchlock before using it as a shield while they attack with a saber using their other hand.
1598		Cantonese officials give permission to the Spanish to trade in El Piñal
1599		All major ports have senior eunuchs in residence

== 17th century ==
=== 1600s ===
Year	Date	Event
1600	January 17	The Portuguese in Macau attack the Spanish in Lampacau. The Spanish abandons El Piñal.
1600		The size of European book collections surpass that of China
1602		Matteo Ricci settles in Beijing to preach Christianity
1603	October	Sangley Rebellion: The Spanish, Japanese, and Filipinos massacre the Chinese population in Manila; the Wanli Emperor blames a eunuch for aggravating the Spanish by asking if they could mine in Cavite
1603		Nurhaci and Ming generals agree to delineate the boundary between their territories
1603		Chinese scholar Chen Di spends some time at the Bay of Tayouan (which Taiwan takes its name from) during a Ming dynasty anti-pirate mission and provides the first significant description of Taiwanese aborigines
1604		Donglin movement: The Donglin Academy is founded
1605	June	A thunderbolt knocks down the flagpole at the Altar of Heaven, which is very inauspicious, causing some officials to resign
1606		Army officers in Yunnan riot and kill Yang Rong, a eunuch superintendent of mining
1606		Ming muskets are attached with plug bayonets.
1607		The first six books of Euclid's Elements are translated into Chinese
1609		The Jia Canal is completed

=== 1610s ===
Year	Date	Event
1610		Joseph Needham estimates that European civilization surpassed China in astronomy and physics around this time
1615		Nurhaci sends his last tributary emissary to Beijing
1616		Nurhaci declares the Later Jin, also known as the Amaga Aisin Gurun
1618	9 May	Battle of Fushun: Later Jin seizes Fushun
1618	summer	Battle of Qinghe: Later Jin takes Qinghe
1619	18 April	Battle of Sarhū: Ming forces are annihilated by Later Jin
1619	26 July	Battle of Kaiyuan: Later Jin takes Kaiyuan
1619	3 September	Battle of Tieling: Later Jin takes Tieling
1619	September	The first Russian envoy, Ivan Petlin, reaches Beijing

=== 1620s ===
Year	Date	Event
1620	18 August	The Wanli Emperor dies
1620	28 August	Zhu Changluo becomes the Taichang Emperor
1620	6 September	The Taichang Emperor becomes ill
1620	26 September	The Taichang Emperor dies
1620	1 October	Zhu Youjiao becomes the Tianqi Emperor
1620		Ming foundries start producing Hongyipao.
1621	4 May	Battle of Shen-Liao: Later Jinseizes Shenyang
1621	fall	She-An Rebellion: Yi people rebel in Sichuan and Guizhou
1621	December	Battle of Fort Zhenjiang: Ming raids into Later Jin are repulsed
1622	11 March	Battle of Guangning: Later Jin seizes Guangning
1622	24 June	Battle of Macau: A Dutch attack on Macau is repelled by the Portuguese
1622	June	White Lotus rebels appear in Shandong
1622	August	White Lotus rebels block the Grand Canal
1622	August	The Dutch start building a fort at Penghu
1622	October	Sino-Dutch conflicts: Dutch vessels start raiding Ming trading ships
1622	November	White Lotus rebels are defeated
1622		An earthquake strikes Gansu, killing 12,000
1623	October	Sino-Dutch conflicts: A Dutch raid on Xiamen is repulsed
1623		She-An Rebellion: Ming forces are defeated
1623		The Yellow River bursts its dikes and flood Xuzhou
1624	26 August	Sino-Dutch conflicts: Ming forces evict the Dutch from Penghu and they retreat to Taiwan, settling near the Bay of Tayouan next to a pirate village
1624		She-An Rebellion: Ming forces defeat rebels but are unable to decisively quell the rebellion
1625		The Donglin movement is purged
1626	10 February	Battle of Ningyuan: A Later Jin attack on Ningyuan is repulsed and Nurhaci is wounded and dies
1627	spring	Battle of Ning-Jin: Later Jin forces under Hong Taiji attack Jinzhou but are repelled
1627	30 September	The Tianqi Emperor dies
1627	2 October	Zhu Youjian becomes the Chongzhen Emperor
1628	spring	Drought hits Shanxi
1628	August	Pirate lord Zheng Zhilong surrenders to the Ming
1629	winter	Jisi Incident: Later Jin forces break through the Great Wall and loot the region around Beijing
1629		The Chongzhen Emperor cuts funding for the imperial post service, causing out of work postal workers to rebel in Shanxi
1629		She-An Rebellion: The rebels are defeated

=== 1630s ===
Year	Date	Event
1630	summer	Jisi Incident: Later Jin forces retreat
1631	April	Rebels capture Pingdu
1631	21 November	Battle of Dalinghe: Later Jin seizes Dalinghe
1632	22 February	Wuqiao Mutiny: Troops from Shandong mutiny and capture Dengzhou
1632		Spanish Manila trade with China reaches 2 million pesos per year
1632		Ming defensive planners build some star forts but they don't catch on in China.
1633	April	Wuqiao Mutiny: Shandong rebels defect to Later Jin
1633	7 July	Battle of Liaoluo Bay: Ming dockyards start construction of multidecked broadside sailing ships capable of holding large cannons under the supervision of Zheng Zhilong; they get blown up by a Dutch surprise attack
1633	summer	Siege of Lüshun: Later Jin seizes Lüshun
1633	22 October	Battle of Liaoluo Bay: Ming forces defeat a Dutch pirate fleet near Kinmen Island (Quemoy)
1633	27 December	Rebels take Mianzhi
1634	14 September	Rebellion breaks out at Tongcheng
1635	March	Rebels take Fengyang
1635	August	Ming forces are defeated by rebels in Gansu
1635	September	Li Zicheng rebels in Shanxi
1635		Telescopes are used for aiming artillery in the Ming dynasty.
1636		Hong Taiji proclaims the Qing dynasty
1638		Qing dynasty conquers Shandong
1638		Ming forces are defeated on the Shanxi-Henan border
1639		The Spanish and Filipinos massacre 20,000 Chinese in Luzon
1639		Portuguese merchants from Macau are banned from Nagasaki
1639		Zhejiang experiences drought

=== 1640s ===
Year	Date	Event
1640	summer	Rebels enter Sichuan
1641		Li Zicheng enters Henan
1641	March	Li Zicheng takes Luoyang
1641		Rebel leader Zhang Xianzhong takes Xiangyang
1641	15 July	Zhang Xianzhong takes Wuchang
1641	October	Zhang Xianzhong takes Changsha and Hengzhou
1641	October	Li Zicheng takes Kaifeng
1641		Locusts attack Zhejiang
1642	8 April	Battle of Song-Jin: Qing dynasty takes Jinzhou
1642		Floods strike Zhejiang
1642		Composite metal cannons are produced in the Ming dynasty.
1642		Li Zicheng's rebels manage to create a two zhang breach in Ming fortifications using cannons.
1643	January	Li Zicheng takes Xiangyang
1643	November	Li Zicheng takes Xi'an
1643		Zhang Xianzhong declares the Xi dynasty in Huguang
1644	8 February	Li Zicheng proclaims his Shun dynasty in Xi'an
1644	25 April	Li Zicheng takes Beijing and the Chongzhen Emperor hangs himself
1644	27 May	Battle of Shanhai Pass: Wu Sangui lets the Qing forces through the Great Wall and their forces defeat Li Zicheng in battle, after which Li retreats to Beijing
1644	5 June	Qing dynasty takes Beijing and Li Zicheng flees
1644	19 June	Zhu Yousong becomes the Hongguang Emperor of Southern Ming in Nanjing
1644		Zhang Xianzhong relocates to Chengdu and proceeds to massacre the Sichuanpopulation
1645	January	Qing forces capture Luoyang
1645	20 May	Qing forces capture Yangzhou
1645	16 June	Qing forces capture Nanjing and the Hongguang Emperor
1645	June	Li Zicheng dies
1645	6 July	Qing forces capture Hangzhou
1645	21 July	All nonclerical adult male citizens are ordered to adopt the Manchu queue to show their allegiance to the Qing dynasty
1645	18 August	Zhu Yujian becomes the Longwu Emperor at Fuzhou
1645	August	Zhu Yihai becomes regent of Ming at Shaoxing, taking control of Ming loyalists at Yuyao and Taizhou
1646	February	Ming forces are defeated in Jiangnan
1646	10 July	Qing forces defeat the Ming army at Tonglu
1646	30 September	Qing forces capture Yanping
1646	6 October	The Longwu Emperor is killed by Qing forces
1646	17 October	Qing forces take Fuzhou
1646	12 December	Zhu Yuyue becomes the Shaowu Emperor in Guangzhou
1646	24 December	Zhu Youlang becomes the Yongli Emperor in Zhaoqing
1647	2 January	Zhang Xianzhong is killed by Qing forces but his army occupies Chongqing and then occupies Sichuan under the leadership of Sun Kewang
1647	20 January	Qing forces capture Guangzhou and the Shaowu Emperor
1647	5 March	Qing forces conquer Guangdong, half of Guangxi, and Hainan
1647	March	Qing forces take Changsha
1647	spring	Qing forces raid Anping
1647	23 September	Qing forces take Wugang
1647		Zhu Yihai conducts raids on the coast of Fujian from island bases
1648	20 February	Ming loyalists rebel at Nanchang and Nanning
1648	14 April	Qing forces fail to take Guilin
1649	15 January	Ming loyalists rebel at Datong
1649	1 March	Qing forces take Nanchang
1649	4 October	Ming loyalists at Datong are defeated
1649	summer	Qing forces conquer southern Huguang
1649	24 November	Qing forces slaughter the population of Guangzhou
1649	27 November	Qing forces capture Guilin
1649	2 December	Qing forces capture Zhaoqing and the Yongli Emperor flees

=== 1650s ===
Year	Date	Event
1651	15 October	Qing forces capture Zhoushan and Zhu Yihai flees
1652	7 August	Rebel general Li Dingguo takes Guilin
1652	winter	Sun Kewang's army is routed by Qing forces
1652		Zhu Yihai settles on Kinmen Island (Quemoy) with the help of Zheng Chenggong and renounces his title as Regent of Ming
1653		Li Dingguo retreats to Guangdong
1655		Li Dingguo 's army is routed by Qingforces
1655		Ming loyalist Zheng Chenggong establishes Xiamen as his base
1656	March	The Yongli Emperor arrives in Yunnan
1656	9 May	Qing forces try to invade Kinmen Island (Quemoy) but their fleet is destroyed in a storm
1657	February	Ming forces defeat a Qing army near the Changjiang River Delta
1657	October	Sun Kewang's forces are defeated by Li Dingguo in eastern Yunnan and he retreats to Guizhou
1657	December	Sun Kewang surrenders to the Qing dynasty
1658	June	Zheng Chenggong occupies Wenzhou
1659	7 January	Qing forces advance into Yunnan and the Yongli Emperor flees to Toungoo dynasty
1659	10 March	Qing forces capture Yongchang and defeat Li Dingguo 's army, securing Yunnan
1659	June	The Yongli Emperor reaches Inwa
1659	10 August	Zheng Chenggong takes Zhenjiang
1659	24 August	Zheng Chenggong lays siege to Nanjing
1659	9 September	Zheng Chenggong's army is annihilated and he retreats to Xiamen

=== 1660s ===
Year	Date	Event
1660	February	Qing forces launch an attack on Kinmen Island (Quemoy) and Xiamen but fail
1661	21 April	Zheng Chenggong departs from Kinmen Island (Quemoy) for Taiwan
1661	30 April	Zheng Chenggong arrives on the shores of Dutch Formosa
1661	1 May	Fort Provintia surrenders to Zheng Chenggong
1661	June	Pye Min massacres most of the Yongli Emperor's entourage
1662	20 January	Qing forces advance towards Inwa and force the return of the Yongli Emperor
1662	1 February	Siege of Fort Zeelandia: Fort Zeelandia surrenders to Zheng Chenggong
1662	May	The Yongli Emperor is executed in Yunnan; so ends the Southern Ming resistance on the mainland
1662	23 June	Zheng Chenggong dies and is succeeded by his son Zheng Jing
1662	23 December	Zhu Yihai dies
1664		The Qing dynasty conquers Fujian and Zheng Jing retreats to Taiwan

== Gallery ==
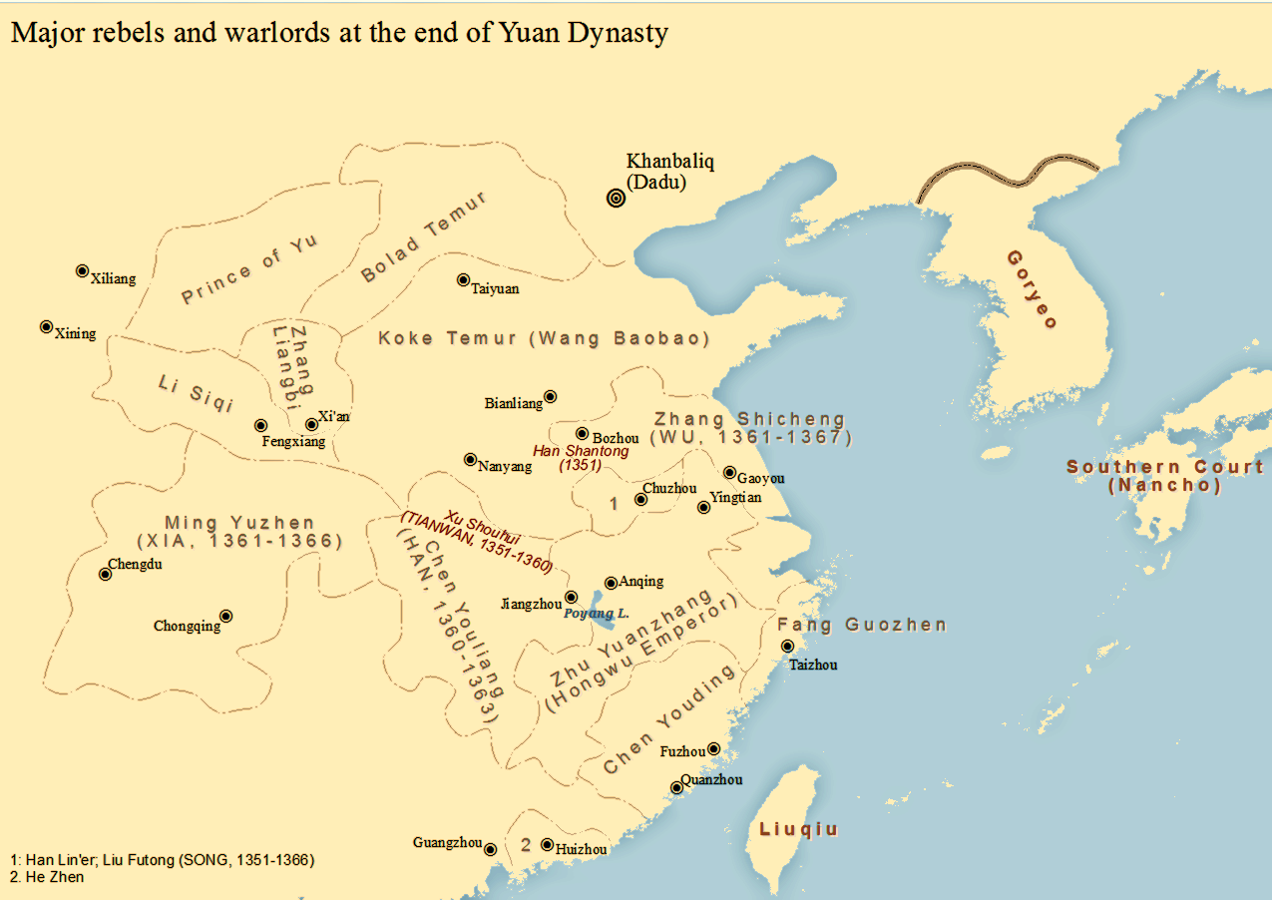
Red Turban Rebellion (1351–1368)

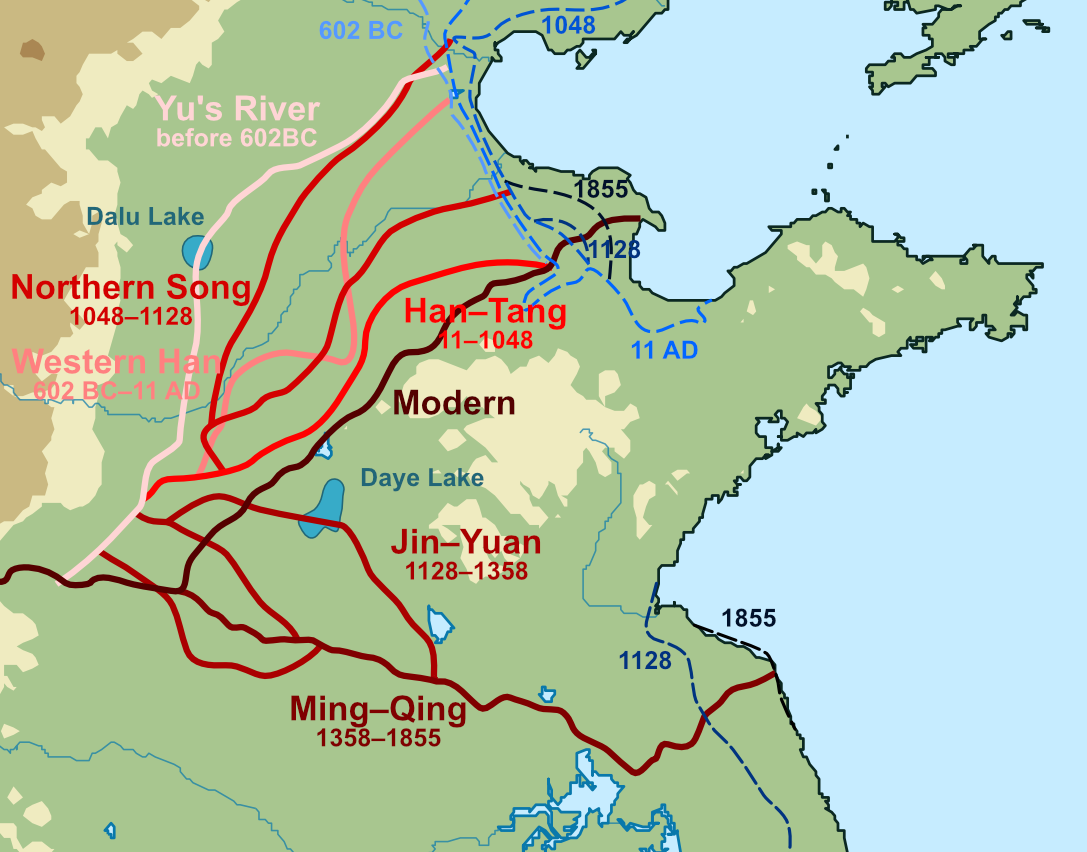
Yellow River course change in 1358

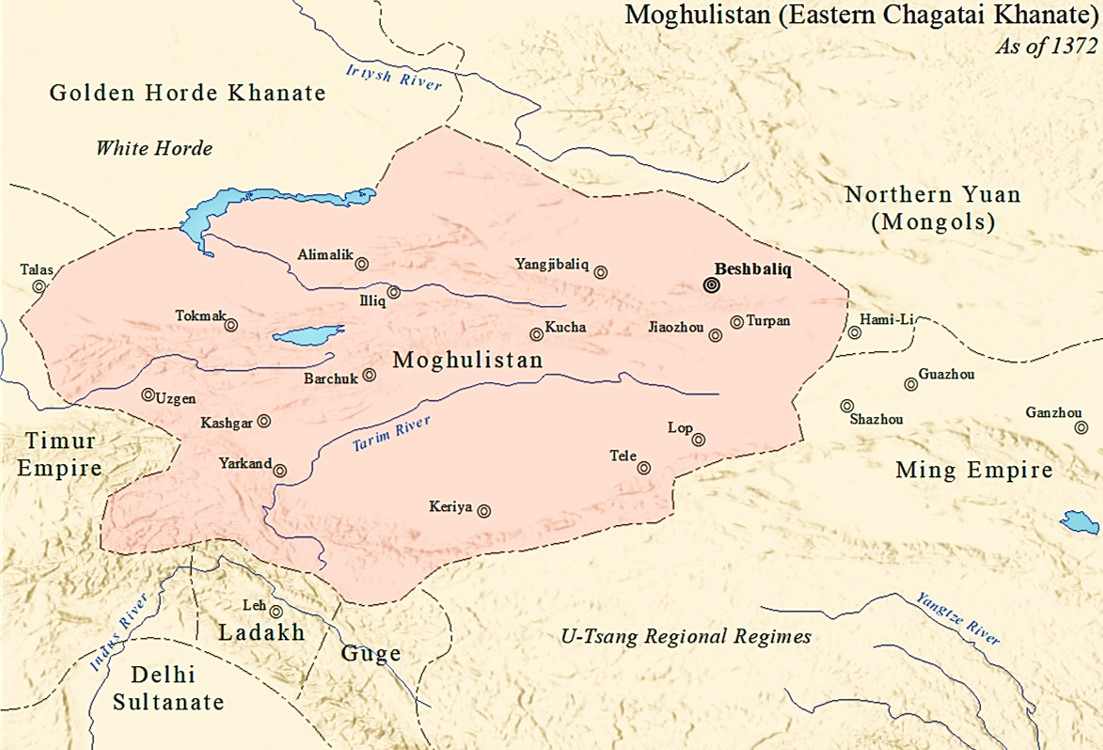
Moghulistan in 1372

Jingnan Campaign (1399–1402)

Zheng He's treasure ships (1405–1433)

Yishiha's voyages in the context of military and diplomatic activities in the Yongle era of the Ming dynasty. Yishiha's route is in blue, along with those of Zheng He (in black) and Chen Cheng (in green).

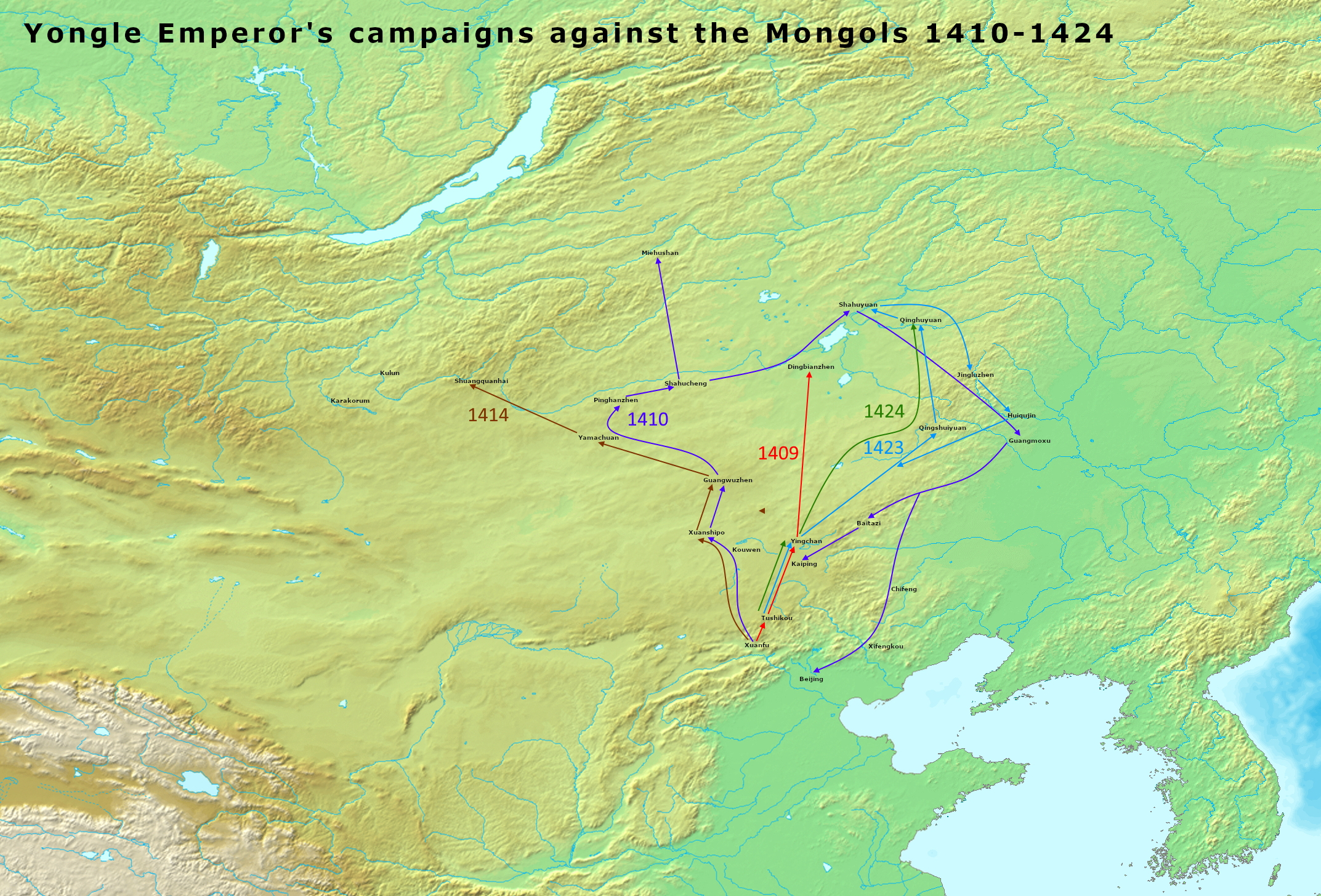
The Yongle Emperor's campaigns against the Mongols, (1410–1424)

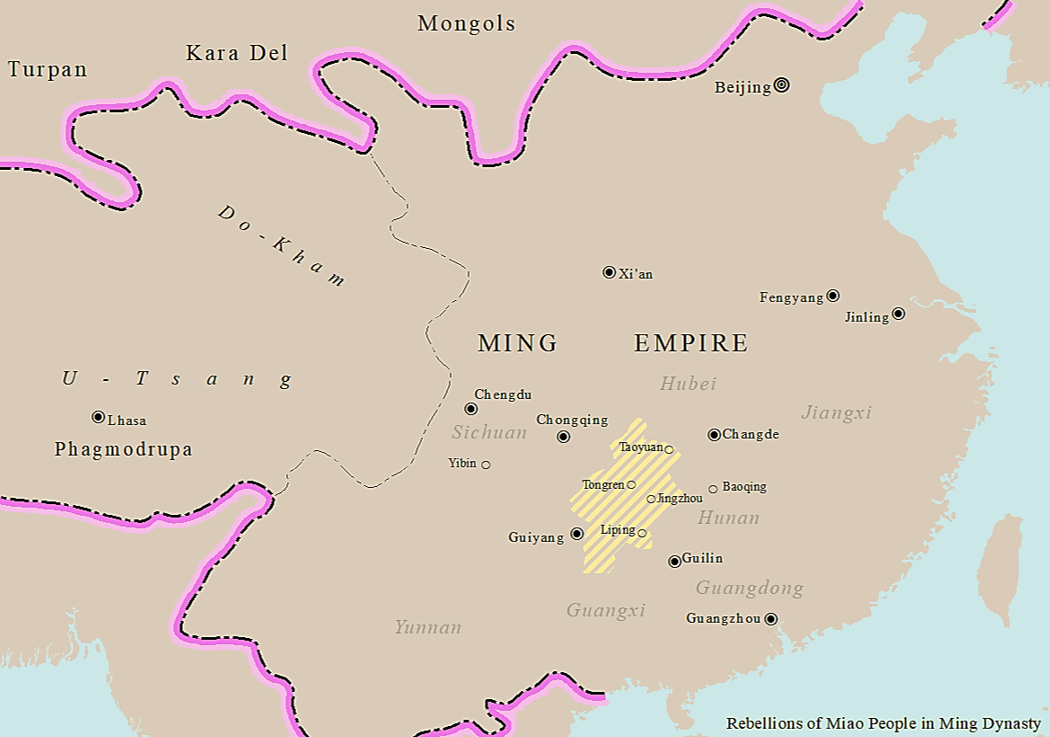
Region suffering from Miao rebellions during the Ming dynasty

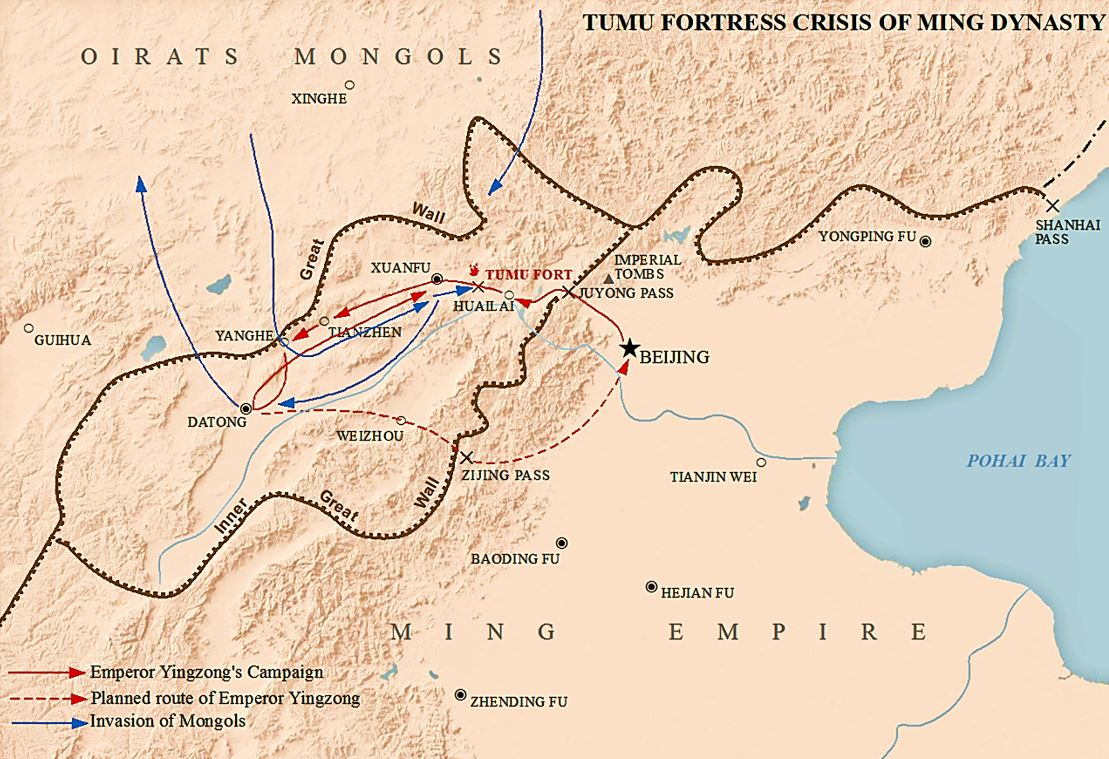
Tumu Crisis in 1449

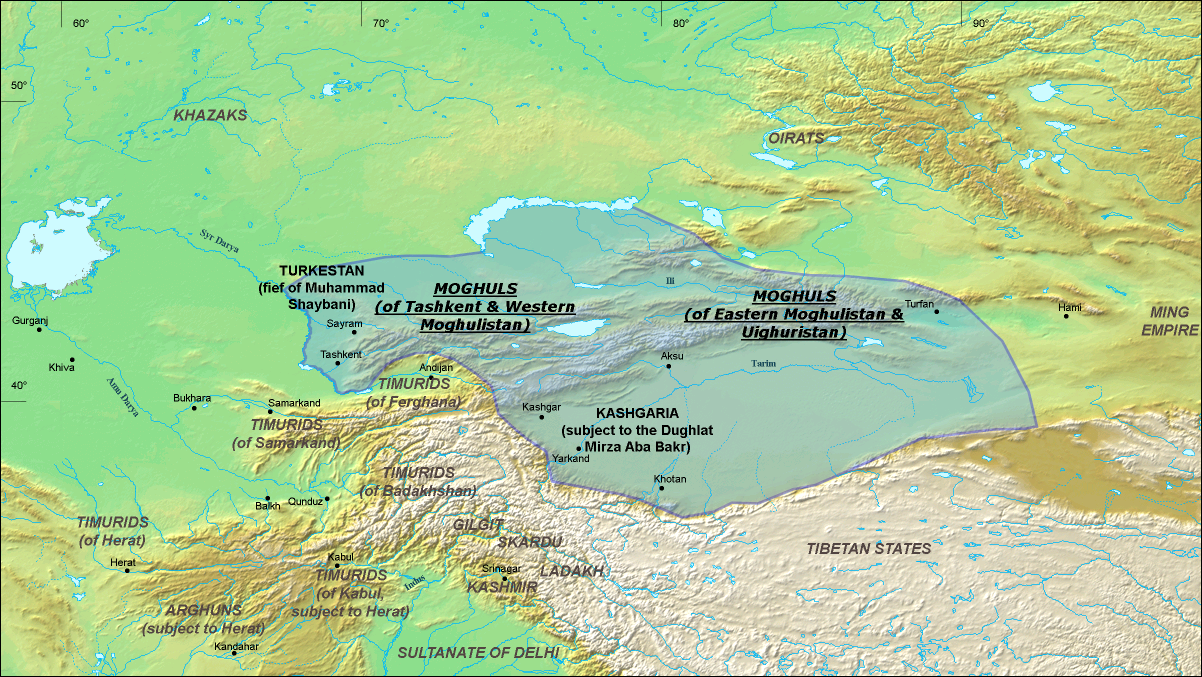
Moghulistan in 1490

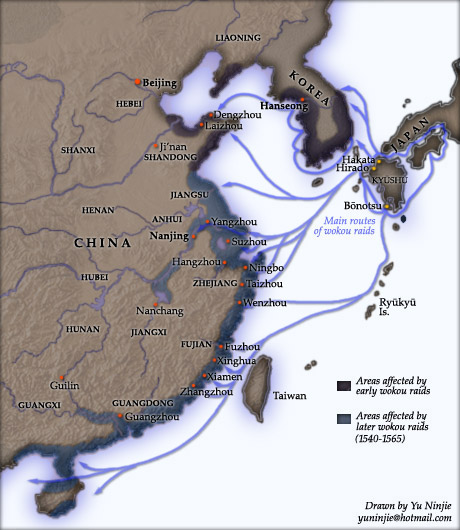
14th and 16th century wokou raids

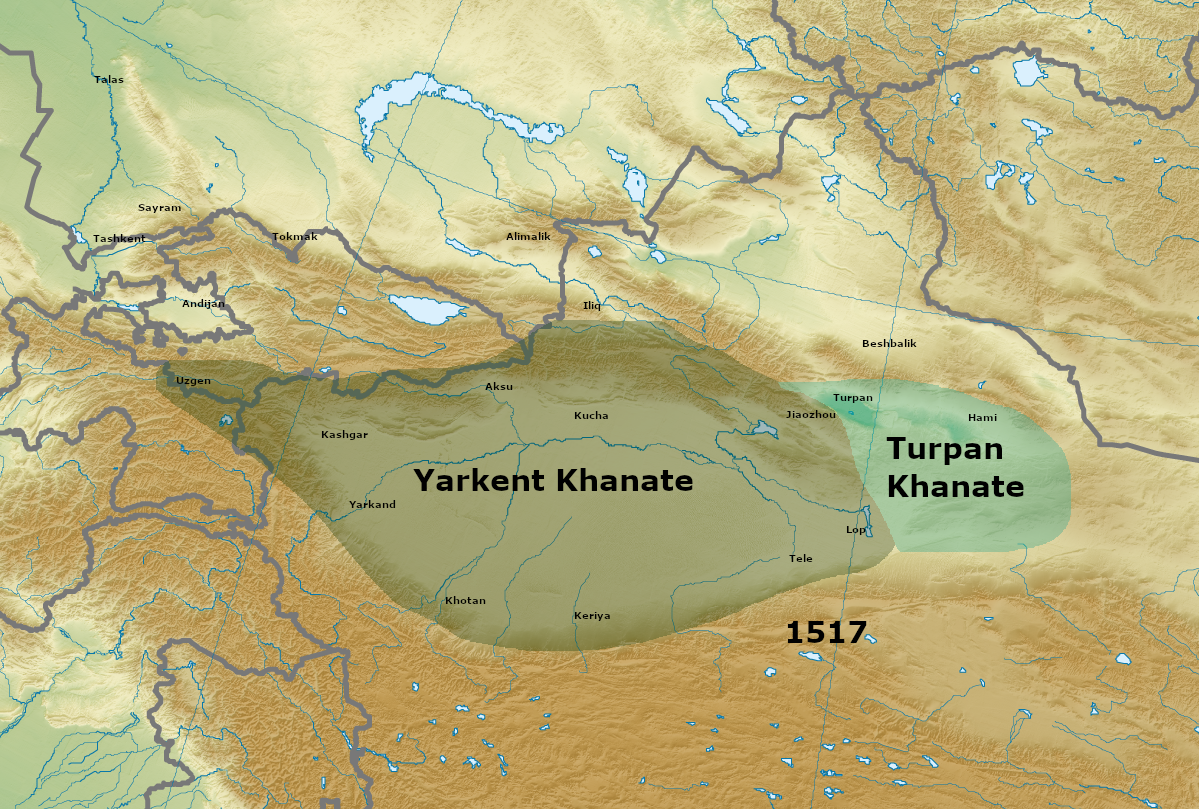
Yarkent Khanate and Mansur Khan's Turpan Khanate in 1517

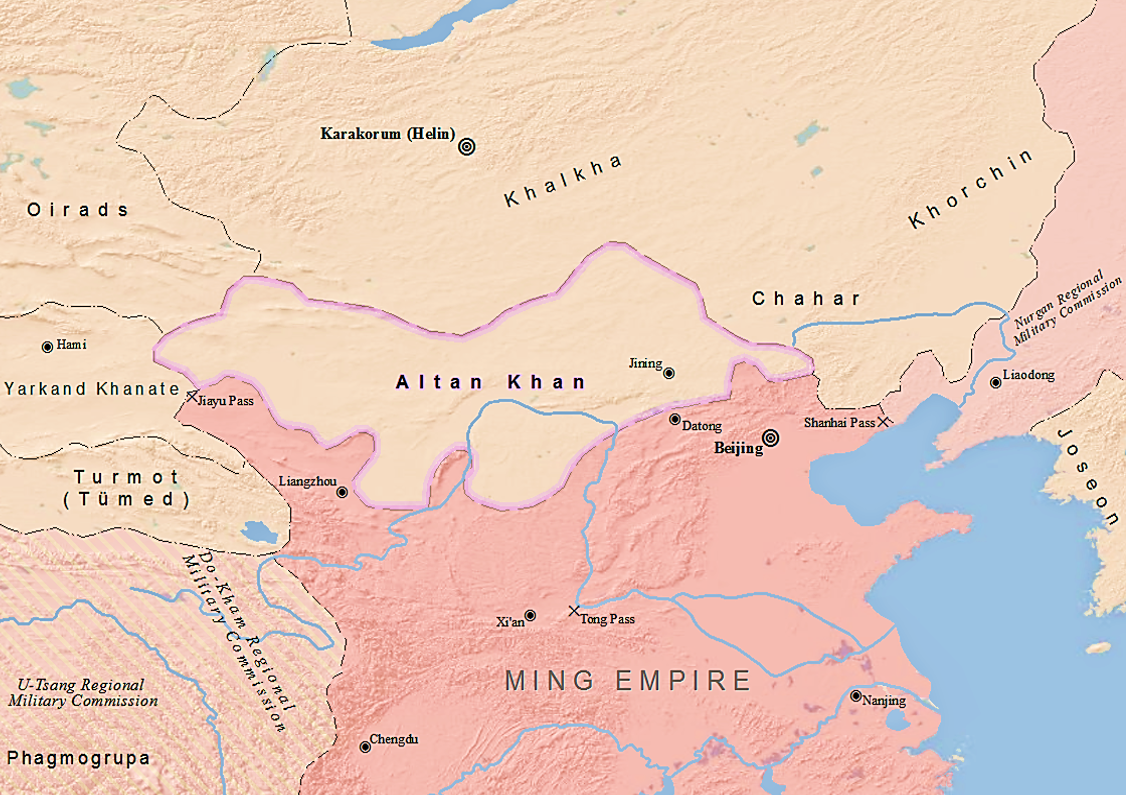
Realm of Altan Khan in 1571

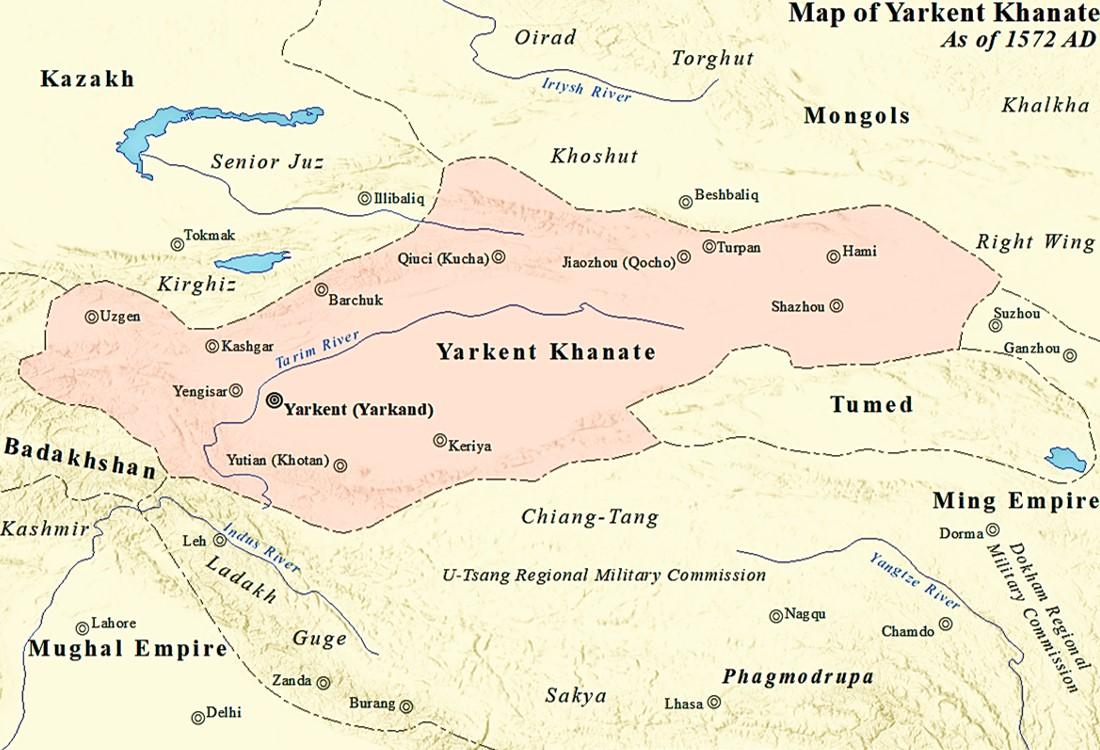
Yarkent Khanate in 1572

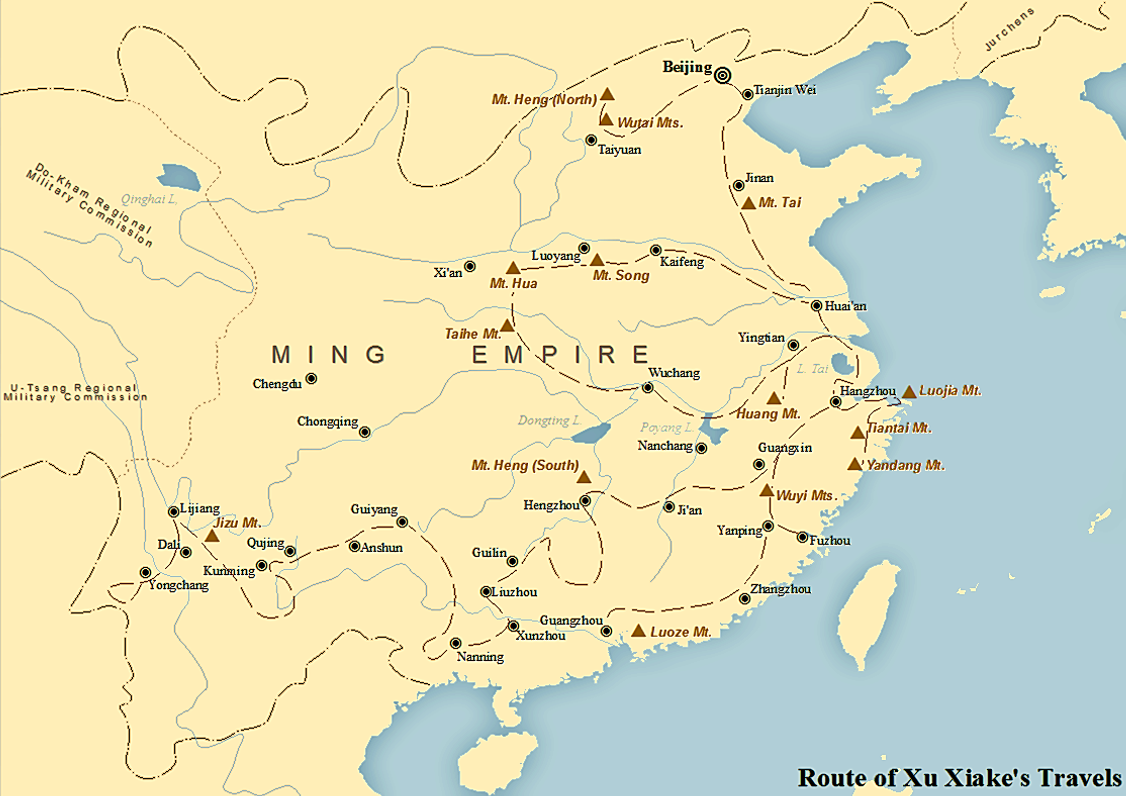
Xu Xiake's (1587–1641) travels

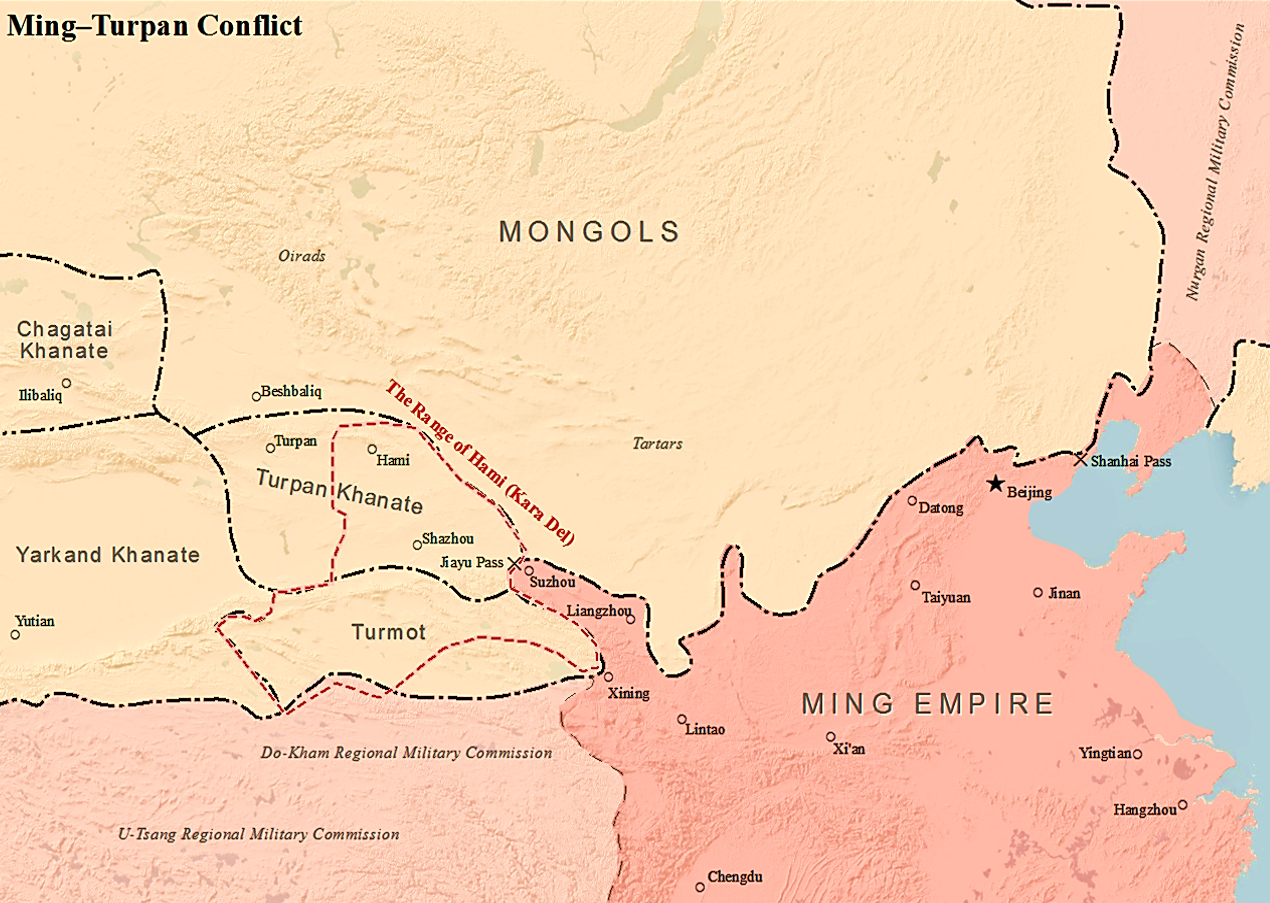
Ming–Turpan conflict, 15th to 16th centuries

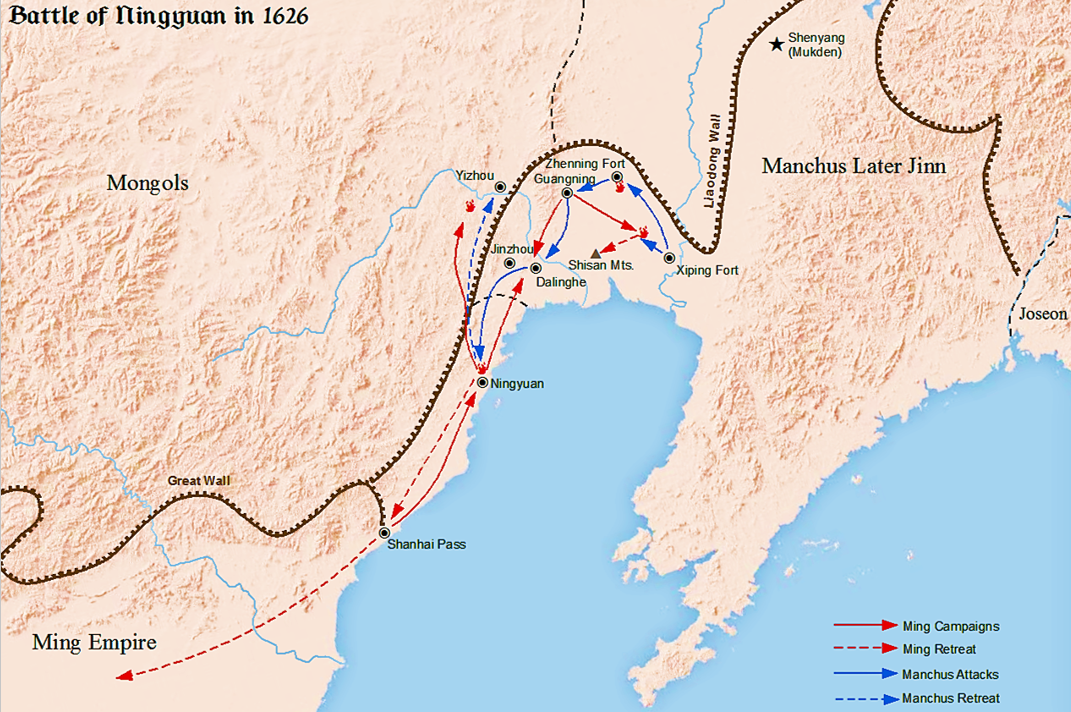
Battle of Ningyuan in 1626

Late Ming peasant rebellions 1628–1636

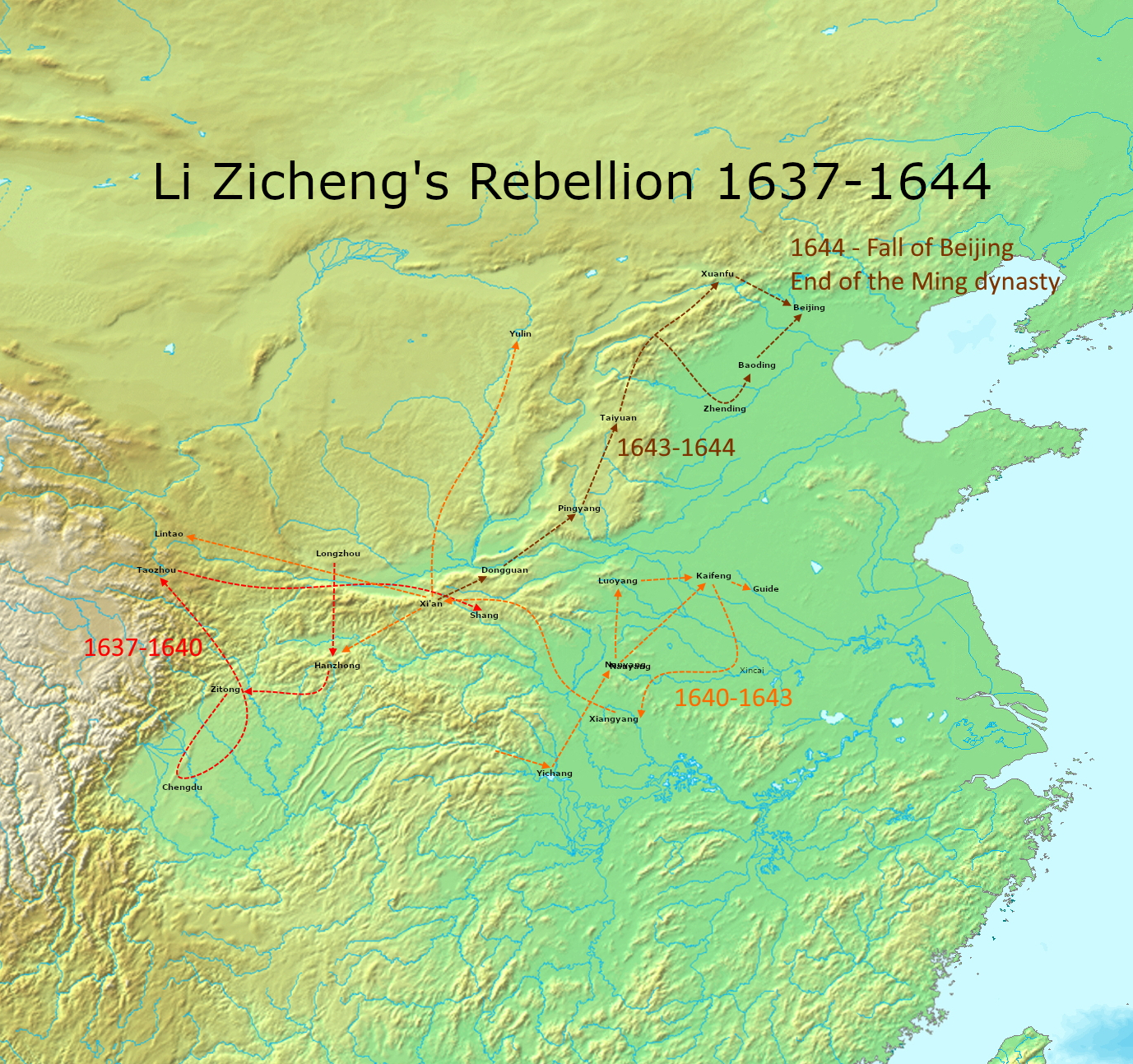
Li Zicheng's rebellion 1637–1644

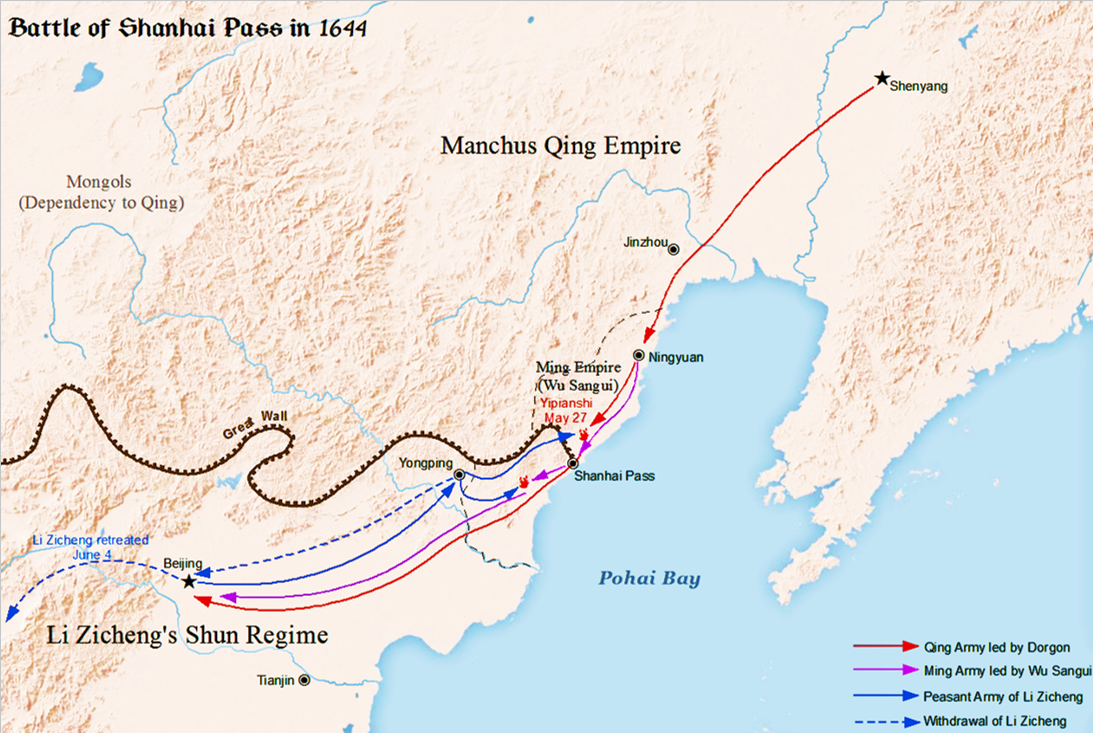
Battle of Shanhai Pass in 1644

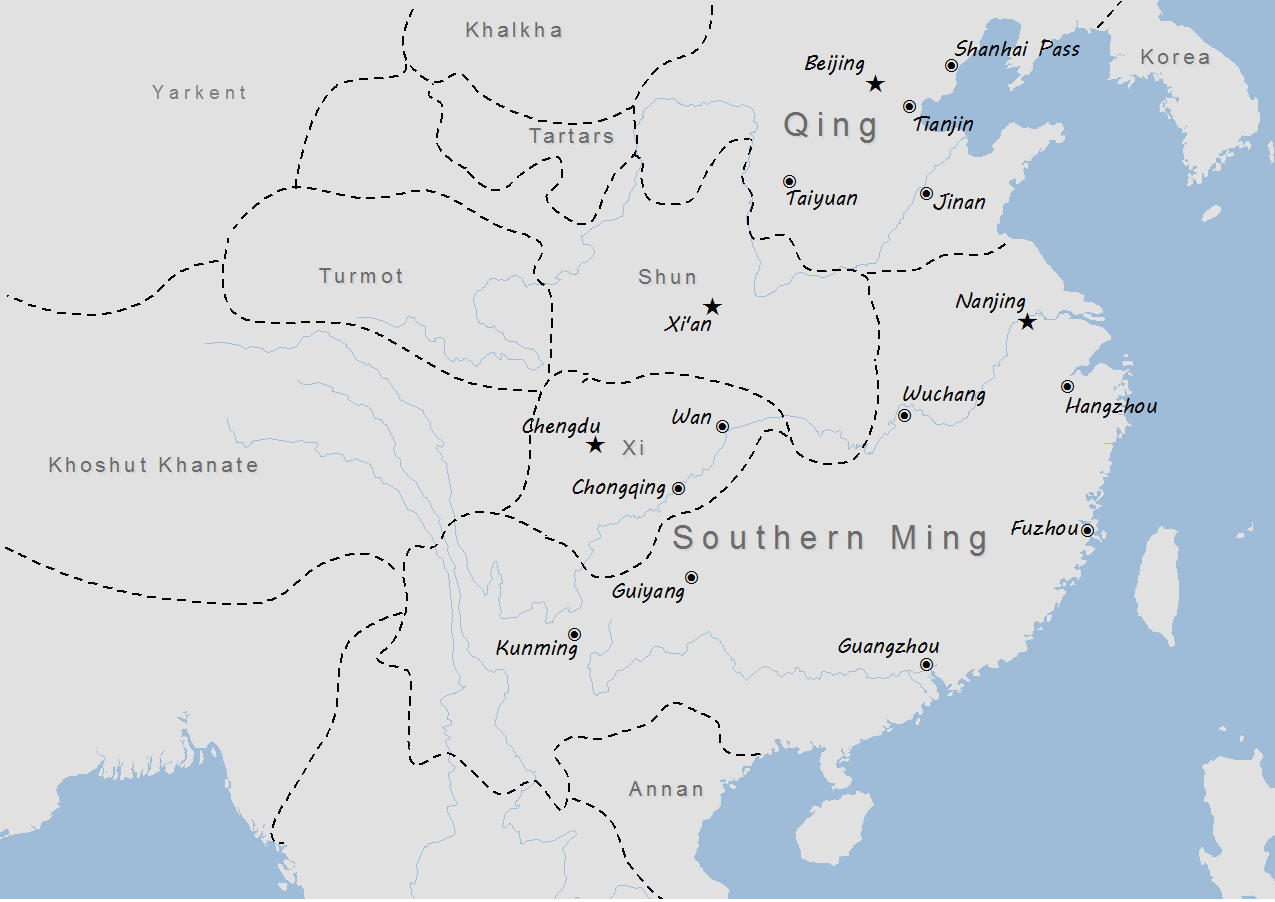
Southern Ming in November 1644

The flight of the Yongli Emperor—the last sovereign of the Southern Ming dynasty—from 1647 to 1661. The provincial and national boundaries are those of the People's Republic of China.

== See also ==
- Timeline of the Ming treasure voyages
- Timeline of the Jurchens

== Bibliography ==
- Andrade, Tonio (2008a), "Chapter 1: Taiwan on the Eve of Colonization", How Taiwan Became Chinese: Dutch, Spanish, and Han Colonization in the Seventeenth Century, Columbia University Press
- Andrade, Tonio (2008b), "Chapter 2: A Scramble for Influence", How Taiwan Became Chinese: Dutch, Spanish, and Han Colonization in the Seventeenth Century, Columbia University Press
- Andrade, Tonio (2008c), "Chapter 3: Pax Hollandica", How Taiwan Became Chinese: Dutch, Spanish, and Han Colonization in the Seventeenth Century, Columbia University Press
- Andrade, Tonio (2008d), "Chapter 4: La Isla Hermosa: The Rise of the Spanish Colony in Northern Taiwan", How Taiwan Became Chinese: Dutch, Spanish, and Han Colonization in the Seventeenth Century, Columbia University Press
- Andrade, Tonio (2008e), "Chapter 5: The Fall of Spanish Taiwan", How Taiwan Became Chinese: Dutch, Spanish, and Han Colonization in the Seventeenth Century, Columbia University Press
- Andrade, Tonio (2008f), "Chapter 6: The Birth of Co-colonization", How Taiwan Became Chinese: Dutch, Spanish, and Han Colonization in the Seventeenth Century, Columbia University Press
- Andrade, Tonio (2008g), "Chapter 7: The Challenges of a Chinese Frontier", How Taiwan Became Chinese: Dutch, Spanish, and Han Colonization in the Seventeenth Century, Columbia University Press
- Andrade, Tonio (2008h), "Chapter 8: "The Only Bees on Formosa That Give Honey"", How Taiwan Became Chinese: Dutch, Spanish, and Han Colonization in the Seventeenth Century, Columbia University Press
- Andrade, Tonio (2008i), "Chapter 9: Lord and Vassal: Company Rule over the Aborigines", How Taiwan Became Chinese: Dutch, Spanish, and Han Colonization in the Seventeenth Century, Columbia University Press
- Andrade, Tonio (2008j), "Chapter 10: The Beginning of the End", How Taiwan Became Chinese: Dutch, Spanish, and Han Colonization in the Seventeenth Century, Columbia University Press
- Andrade, Tonio (2008k), "Chapter 11: The Fall of Dutch Taiwan", How Taiwan Became Chinese: Dutch, Spanish, and Han Colonization in the Seventeenth Century, Columbia University Press
- Andrade, Tonio (2008l), "Conclusion", How Taiwan Became Chinese: Dutch, Spanish, and Han Colonization in the Seventeenth Century, Columbia University Press
- Andrade, Tonio (2016), The Gunpowder Age: China, Military Innovation, and the Rise of the West in World History, Princeton University Press, ISBN 978-0-691-13597-7.
- Asimov, M.S. (1998), History of civilizations of Central Asia Volume IV The age of achievement: A.D. 750 to the end of the fifteenth century Part One The historical, social and economic setting, UNESCO Publishing
- Atwood, Christopher P. (2004), Encyclopedia of Mongolia and the Mongol Empire, Facts On File
- Barfield, Thomas (1989), The Perilous Frontier: Nomadic Empires and China, Basil Blackwell
- Barrett, Timothy Hugh (2008), The Woman Who Discovered Printing, Great Britain: Yale University Press, ISBN 978-0-300-12728-7 (alk. paper)
- Beckwith, Christopher I. (2009), Empires of the Silk Road: A History of Central Eurasia from the Bronze Age to the Present, Princeton University Press, ISBN 978-0-691-13589-2
- Beckwith, Christopher I (1987), The Tibetan Empire in Central Asia: A History of the Struggle for Great Power among Tibetans, Turks, Arabs, and Chinese during the Early Middle Ages, Princeton University Press
- Biran, Michal (2005), The Empire of the Qara Khitai in Eurasian History: Between China and the Islamic World, Cambridge Studies in Islamic Civilization, Cambridge, England: Cambridge University Press, ISBN 0521842263
- Bregel, Yuri (2003), An Historical Atlas of Central Asia, Brill
- Chase, Kenneth (2003), Firearms: A Global History to 1700, Cambridge University Press, ISBN 0-521-82274-2.
- Dardess, John (2012), Ming China 1368-1644 A Concise History of A Resilient Empire, Rowman & Littlefield Publishers, Inc.
- Dmytryshyn, Basil (1985), Russia's Conquest of Siberia, Western Imprints, The Press of the Oregon Historical Society
- Dreyer, Edward L. (2007), Zheng He: China and the Oceans in the Early Ming Dynasty, 1405-1433, Pearson Longman
- Drompp, Michael Robert (2005), Tang China And The Collapse Of The Uighur Empire: A Documentary History, Brill
- Duyvendak, J.J.L. (1938), "The True Dates of the Chinese Maritime Expeditions in the Early Fifteenth Century", T'oung Pao, 34 (5): 341–413, doi:10.1163/156853238X00171
- Ebrey, Patricia Buckley (1999), The Cambridge Illustrated History of China, Cambridge: Cambridge University Press, ISBN 0-521-66991-X (paperback).
- Ebrey, Patricia Buckley; Walthall, Anne; Palais, James B. (2006), East Asia: A Cultural, Social, and Political History, Boston: Houghton Mifflin, ISBN 0-618-13384-4
- Fernquest, John (2006), Crucible of War: Burma and the Ming in the Tai Frontier Zone (1382-1454)
- Geary, Norman (2003), The Kam People of China, RoutledgeCurzon
- Golden, Peter B. (1992), An Introduction to the History of the Turkic Peoples: Ethnogenesis and State-Formation in Medieval and Early Modern Eurasia and the Middle East, OTTO HARRASSOWITZ · WIESBADEN
- Graff, David A. (2002), Medieval Chinese Warfare, 300-900, Warfare and History, London: Routledge, ISBN 0415239559
- Graff, David Andrew (2016), The Eurasian Way of War Military Practice in Seventh-Century China and Byzantium, Routledge, ISBN 978-0-415-46034-7.
- Hao, Zhidong (2011), Macau History and Society, HKU Press, ISBN 9789888028542.
- Haywood, John (1998), Historical Atlas of the Medieval World, AD 600-1492, Barnes & Noble
- Jin, Dengjian (2016), The Great Knowledge Transcendence, Palgrave Macmillan
- Knapp, Ronald G. (1980), China's Island Frontier: Studies in the Historical Geography of Taiwan, The University of Hawaii
- Latourette, Kenneth Scott (1964), The Chinese, their history and culture, Volumes 1-2, Macmillan
- Lewis, James (2015), The East Asian War, 1592-1598: International Relations, Violence and Memory, Routledge
- Liew, Foon Ming (1996), The Luchuan-Pingmian Campaigns (1436-1449) in the Light of Official Chinese Historiography
- Lorge, Peter A. (2008), The Asian Military Revolution: from Gunpowder to the Bomb, Cambridge University Press, ISBN 978-0-521-60954-8
- Luttwak, Edward N. (2009), The Grand Strategy of the Byzantine Empire, The Belknap Press of Harvard University Press
- Mills, J.V.G. (1970), Ying-yai Sheng-lan: 'The Overall Survey of the Ocean's Shores' [1433], Cambridge: Cambridge University Press
- Millward, James (2009), Eurasian Crossroads: A History of Xinjiang, Columbia University Press
- Ming, Liew Foon (1996), The Luchuan-Pingmian Campaigns (1436-1449) in the Light of Official Chinese Historiography
- Mote, F. W. (2003), Imperial China: 900–1800, Harvard University Press, ISBN 978-0674012127
- Narangoa, Li (2014), Historical Atlas of Northeast Asia, 1590-2010: Korea, Manchuria, Mongolia, Eastern Siberia, New York: Columbia University Press, ISBN 9780231160704
- Needham, Joseph (1986), Science & Civilisation in China, vol. V:7: The Gunpowder Epic, Cambridge University Press, ISBN 0-521-30358-3
- Rong, Xinjiang (2013), Eighteen Lectures on Dunhuang, Brill
- Rubinstein, Murray A. (1999), Taiwan: A New History, East Gate Books
- Schafer, Edward H. (1985), The Golden Peaches of Samarkand: A study of T'ang Exotics, University of California Press
- Shaban, M. A. (1979), The ʿAbbāsid Revolution, Cambridge: Cambridge University Press, ISBN 0-521-29534-3
- Sinor, Denis (1990), The Cambridge History of Early Inner Asia, Volume 1, Cambridge University Press
- Sima, Guang (2015), Bóyángbǎn Zīzhìtōngjiàn 54 huánghòu shīzōng 柏楊版資治通鑑54皇后失蹤, Yuǎnliú chūbǎnshìyè gǔfèn yǒuxiàn gōngsī, ISBN 978-957-32-0876-1
- Skaff, Jonathan Karam (2012), Sui-Tang China and Its Turko-Mongol Neighbors: Culture, Power, and Connections, 580-800 (Oxford Studies in Early Empires), Oxford University Press
- Sousa Pinto, Paulo Jorge de (2008). "Enemy at the Gates - Macao, Manila and the "Pinhal Episode" (end of the 16th Century)". Bulletin of Portuguese - Japanese Studies. 16: 11–43.
- Standen, Naomi (2007), Unbounded Loyalty Frontier Crossings in Liao China, University of Hawai'i Press
- Steinhardt, Nancy Shatzman (1997), Liao Architecture, University of Hawaii Press
- Swope, Kenneth M. (2009), A Dragon's Head and a Serpent's Tail: Ming China and the First Great East Asian War, 1592-1598, University of Oklahoma Press.
- Swope, Kenneth (2014), The Military Collapse of China's Ming Dynasty, Routledge
- Tsien Tsuen-Hsuin (1985). Needham, Joseph (ed.). Science and Civilisation in China: Volume 5, Chemistry and Chemical Technology, Part 1, Paper and Printing. Taipei: Caves Books. ISBN 978-0-521-08690-5.
- Twitchett, Denis C. (1979), The Cambridge History of China, Vol. 3, Sui and T'ang China, 589–906, Cambridge University Press
- Twitchett, Denis (1994), "The Liao", The Cambridge History of China, Volume 6, Alien Regime and Border States, 907-1368, Cambridge: Cambridge University Press, pp. 43–153, ISBN 0521243319
- Twitchett, Denis (1998), The Cambridge History of China Volume 7 The Ming Dynasty, 1368—1644, Part I, Cambridge University Press
- Twitchett, Denis (1998b), The Cambridge History of China Volume 8 The Ming Dynasty, 1368—1644, Part 2, Cambridge University Press
- Twitchett, Denis (2008), The Cambridge History of China 1, Cambridge University Press
- Twitchett, Denis (2009), The Cambridge History of China Volume 5 The Sung dynasty and its Predecessors, 907-1279, Cambridge University Press
- Wakeman, Frederic (1985), The Great Enterprise: The Manchu Reconstruction of Imperial Order in Seventeenth-Century China, vol. 1, University of California Press
- Wang, Zhenping (2013), Tang China in Multi-Polar Asia: A History of Diplomacy and War, University of Hawaii Press
- Wilkinson, Endymion (2012), Chinese History: A New Manual, Harvard University Asia Center for the Harvard-Yenching Institute
- Wilkinson, Endymion (2015). Chinese History: A New Manual, 4th edition. Cambridge, MA: Harvard University Asia Center distributed by Harvard University Press. ISBN 9780674088467.
- Wills, John E. (2011), China and Maritime Europe, 1500–1800: Trade, Settlement, Diplomacy, and Missions, Cambridge University Press.
- Xiong, Victor Cunrui (2000), Sui-Tang Chang'an: A Study in the Urban History of Late Medieval China (Michigan Monographs in Chinese Studies), U OF M CENTER FOR CHINESE STUDIES, ISBN 0892641371
- Xiong, Victor Cunrui (2009), Historical Dictionary of Medieval China, United States of America: Scarecrow Press, Inc., ISBN 978-0810860537
- Xu, Elina-Qian (2005), HISTORICAL DEVELOPMENT OF THE PRE-DYNASTIC KHITAN, Institute for Asian and African Studies 7
- Xue, Zongzheng (1992), Turkic peoples, China Social Sciences Press
- Yuan, Shu (2001), Bóyángbǎn Tōngjiàn jìshìběnmò 28 dìèrcìhuànguánshídài 柏楊版通鑑記事本末28第二次宦官時代, Yuǎnliú chūbǎnshìyè gǔfèn yǒuxiàn gōngsī, ISBN 957-32-4273-7
- Yule, Henry (1915), Cathay and the Way Thither: Being a Collection of Medieval Notices of China, Vol I: Preliminary Essay on the Intercourse Between China and the Western Nations Previous to the Discovery of the Cape Route, Hakluyt Society
