= Xingcha Shenglan =

1436 historical work by Fei Xin

- Author: Fei Xin
- Original title: 星槎勝覽
- Language: Chinese
- Genre: Travel literature, Historical text
- Published: 1436
- Publication place: Ming Dynasty China
- Media type: Print

The Xingcha Shenglan (Chinese: 星槎勝覽; lit. 'The Overall Survey of the Star Raft') is a Chinese historical work written by Fei Xin. Fei Xin served as a soldier in the third, fifth, and seventh Ming treasure voyages under the command of Admiral Zheng He. The book contains descriptions of foreign places that the Chinese mariners had seen. The literary term "star raft" refers to an ambassador's flagship.

According to Dreyer (2007), Fei Xin's book was strongly influenced by Ma Huan's Yingya Shenglan. Ma Huan was a translator and interpreter on Zheng He's fourth, sixth, and seventh treasure voyage.

Fei Xin's original work comprised two chapters. However, he rewrote and illustrated the initial work before presenting it to the court.

== See also ==
- Ma Huan's Yingya Shenglan [瀛涯勝覽]
- Gong Zhen's Xiyang Fanguo Zhi [西洋番國志]

== Literature ==
- Dreyer, Edward L. (2007), Zheng He: China and the oceans in the early Ming dynasty, 1405-1433, Pearson Longman, ISBN 978-0-321-08443-9
- Duyvendak, J. J. L. (1938). "The True Dates of the Chinese Maritime Expeditions in the Early Fifteenth Century". T'oung Pao. 34 (5): 341–413. doi:10.1163/156853238X00171. JSTOR 4527170.
