= Yingya Shenglan =

1451 book by Ma Huan

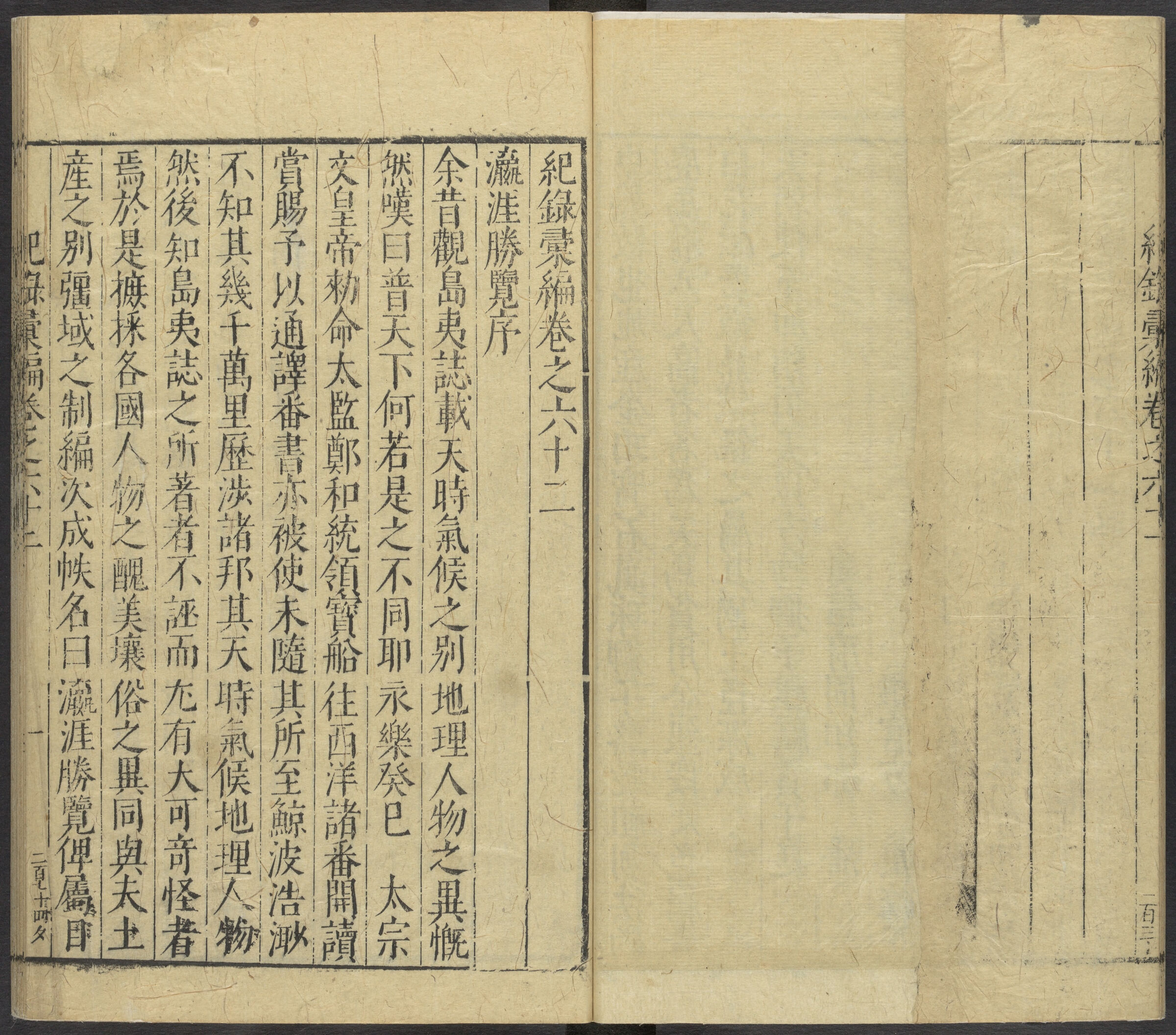
- First page of the Yingya Shenglan (1451), as collected in the Jilu Huibian (1617)
- Traditional Chinese: 瀛涯勝覽
- Simplified Chinese: 瀛涯胜览
- Literal meaning: The Overall Survey of the Ocean's Shores
Transcriptions
Standard Mandarin
- Hanyu Pinyin: Yíngyá Shènglǎn

The Yingya Shenglan (English: The Overall Survey of the Ocean's Shores), written by Ma Huan, is a book about the countries visited by the Chinese over the course of the Ming treasure voyages led by Zheng He. The work was published in 1451.

== Development ==
Ma Huan (馬歡) wrote the book Yingya Shenglan. He served as an interpreter on the fourth, sixth, and seventh Ming treasure voyages. Guo Chongli (郭崇礼), who participated in three of the voyages, was Ma Huan collaborator on the book. The two gentlemen recorded their observations about the different countries visited during the voyages, which were used to compose the book.

On his return to China in 1415, Ma Huan started to arrange their notes into book form. In 1416, he wrote a foreword and poem for the book. He later introduced the Yongle Emperor's posthumous title, which was conferred in 1424, to the foreword.

In 1444, Ma Jing wrote a foreword for the book. In 1451, the imperial clerk Gu Po wrote an afterword for the book. Guo Chongli, with the help of his friend Lu Tingyong, successfully sought out Gu Po to write the afterword. The book was published in 1451.

== Versions ==
There is no known extant version of the original Yingya Shenglan, published in 1451. However, later copies of Ma Huan's work have been preserved, even though these copies contain differences due to later editors.

The work Guochao Diangu (國朝典故) contains one of the Yingya Shenglan versions. The work was edited by Zhu Dangmian (朱當㴐) at an unknown date between 1451 and 1644. The version comprises 42 folios in chapter 106 of the work. The National Library in Beijing houses this edition of the work, which is possibly the only extant example. The version does not include a foreword, poem, or afterword. There is nothing known about the documents on which the version was based. There are a few copies made from the version, but these may contain differences from each other and the version on which these copies are based. For instance, the Columbia University Libraries in New York houses a copy, but there are indications that the copyist availed themselves to other documents as it contains Ma Huan's foreword, Ma Jing's foreword, and Ma Huan's poem, as well as corrected readings and few additional words that do not appear in the earlier version.

The work Jilu Huibian (紀錄彙編), published in circa 1617, contains another Yingya Shenglan version. The work was published by Shen Jiefu (沈節甫) and Chen Yuting (陳于廷). The version comprises 47 folios in chapter 62 of the work. It includes Ma Huan's foreword, his poem, and Gu Po's afterword. Examples of the work are housed at the Cambridge University Library, the Institut des Hautes Études Chinoises in Paris, the Library of Congress in Washington, D.C., the Harvard Library in Cambridge, and the National Palace Museum in Taipei. Manuscript copies of the version can be found at the British Museum in London and the Sinological Institute in Leiden.

Zhang Sheng's (張昇) so-called "rifacimento" of the Yingya Shenglan appears in a posthumous edition of Zhang Sheng's works, which was published by his son in 1522. Furthermore, the version was published in chapter 63 of the Jilu Huibian (circa 1617), comprising 22 folios, and was included in various other works. Zhang Sheng condensed and rewrote the Yingya Shenglan into a literary style of composition, even though Ma Huan had originally written it in a colloquial style.

The work Shengchao Yishi (勝朝遺事), published by Wu Miguang (吳彌光) in 1824, contains another Yingya Shenglan version. The version comprises 48 folios in chapter 1 of the work. The Institut des Hautes Études Chinoises in Paris houses an example of the work. The version was based on a manuscript, of which nothing is known.

== See also ==
- Fei Xin's Xingcha Shenglan
- Gong Zhen's Xiyang Fanguo Zhi

== Bibliography ==
- Dreyer, Edward L. (2007). Zheng He: China and the Oceans in the Early Ming Dynasty, 1405–1433. New York, NY: Pearson Longman. ISBN 9780321084439.
- Mills, J. V. G. (1970). Ying-yai Sheng-lan: 'The Overall Survey of the Ocean's Shores' [1433]. Cambridge, England: Cambridge University Press. ISBN 0-521-01032-2.
