= Lin Kuan rebellion =

Wu Mian rebellion
- Part of Kam rebellions
| Date | 1397 |
| Location | Huguang |

Belligerents
| Ming dynasty | Kam people |

Commanders and leaders
| | Lin Kuan |

Casualties and losses
| | 21,500 |

The Lin Kuan rebellion (林寬起義) was an insurrection by the Kam people in the mountainous regions of southern Huguang, due to the confiscation of their land by the Ming dynasty. The rebellion lasted only one year before their leader, Lin Kuan, was killed in October 1397.

== Background ==
After the Wu Mian rebellion was defeated in 1385, 32,000 Ming soldiers came to settle in their land. This sparked a rebellion in 1397.

== Rebellion ==
Lin Kuan's rebel army was initially successful, but the Ming continued to reinforce their army and soon the rebels were left with no option but to hide and attack from the densely forested hills. Villages which did not cooperate with the Ming soldiers were massacred. Lin Kuan and his men eventually found themselves surrounded by Ming troops on a mountain-top. According to Kam folklore, Lin Kuan planted an upside down fir sapling, saying that if it lived, then they too shall live. The sapling sprouted after two days, giving the rebels the courage to attack a weak point in the enemy ranks, breaking out. Despite the momentary success, Lin Kuan was captured and executed in October 1397.

== Aftermath ==
During the short duration of the rebellion, 21,500 Kam and Miao people were killed.

== Bibliography ==
Geary, Norman (2003), The Kam People of China, RoutledgeCurzon
