= Xinghua Prefecture =

Song dynasty military prefecture

- Traditional Chinese: 興化軍府
- Simplified Chinese: 兴化军府
Transcriptions
Standard Mandarin
- Hanyu Pinyin: Xīnghuà Jūnfū

Xinghua Prefecture (興化軍府) was a Song dynasty military prefecture created in 979, under the administration of Fujian Circuit. It was abolished by the Mongol Yuan dynasty in 1277.

Its administrative area is roughly modern Putian and Xianyou County.
