= Wu Mian rebellion =

Historic event in China

- Part of Kam rebellions
Date	1378–1385
Location	Huguang

Belligerents
Ming dynasty	Kam people

Commanders and leaders
	Wu Mian (吳勉)

Strength
100,000	

The Wu Mian rebellion was an insurrection by the Kam people in the mountainous regions of southern Huguang, where they had been forced to migrate due to displacement by Han Chinese farmers. It lasted from 1378 to 1385 before Wu Mian was captured.

== Background ==
In the mid-1300s, drought in Jiangxi province led to migration of Chinese farmers into Kam territory. Gradually these farmers took over more and more Kam land, forcing the Kam to flee into mountain valleys. The displaced Kam led difficult lives and a drought in Wu Mian's village pushed thousands to the point of starvation. However the Ming emperor Zhu Yuanzhang continued to collect taxes from them. They rebelled against the Ming dynasty in 1378.

== Rebellion ==
In 1378, a Kam army surrounded the prefectural city of Liping. The Ming forces were too weak to fight, so they invited the Kam leaders into the city for negotiations. Wu Mian's father was one of the leaders. Once they were inside, they were arrested. Wu Mian's father died soon afterwards.

Wu Mian vowed to take revenge. He attempted to shoot the emperor with bow and arrow, but missed three times. The emperor immediately dispatched 100,000 troops to capture Wu Mian. Wu Mian led an insurrection which lasted seven years before he was captured in 1385.

== Aftermath ==
According to Kam folklore, Wu Mian amassed a great amount of treasure during his time as a fugitive and hid it away under a hill which could only be accessed by a man sized hole. The opening was magic and would close whenever somebody tried to steal the treasure, leaving them trapped inside the vault forever.

== Bibliography ==
- Geary, Norman (2003), The Kam People of China, RoutledgeCurzon
