= Ma Huan =

Chinese translator, voyager, and writer (c. 1380–1460)

- Born: Ma Huan c. 1380; Kuaiji Commandery, Zhejiang, China
- Died: c. 1460
- Occupations: Explorer, Translator, Travel writer
- Writing career
- Language: Chinese, Arabic
- Notable work: Yingya Shenglan (The Overall Survey of the Ocean's Shores)

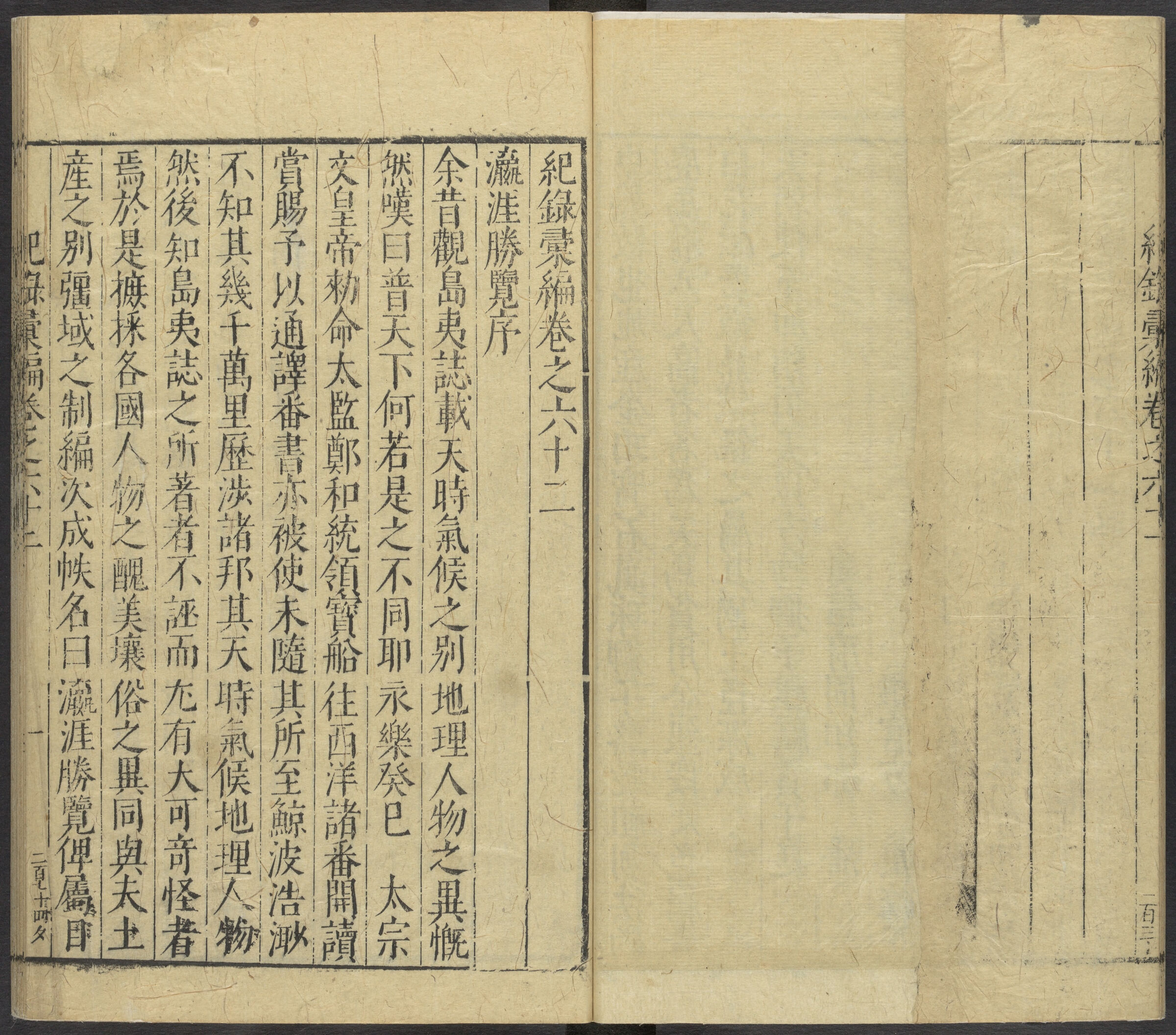
First page of the Yingya Shenglan (1451) by Ma Huan, as collected in the Jilu Huibian (1617)

Ma Huan (simplified Chinese: 马欢; traditional Chinese: 馬歡; pinyin: Mǎ Huān, Xiao'erjing: ﻣَﺎ ﺧُﻮًا) (c. 1380–1460), courtesy name Zongdao (Chinese: 宗道; pinyin: Zōngdào), pen name Mountain-woodcutter (會稽山樵), was a Chinese explorer, translator, and travel writer who accompanied Admiral Zheng He on three of his seven expeditions to the Western Oceans. Ma was a Muslim and was born in Zhejiang's Kuaiji Commandery, an area within the modern borders of Shaoxing. He knew several Classical Chinese and Buddhist texts. He learned Arabic to be able to translate.

== Expeditions and writings ==
In Ma Huan's fourth imperial expedition in 1413, he sailed south and west from China and into the Indian ocean, visiting Champa, Java, Sumatra, Palembang, Siam, Kochi and Hormuz.

In the 1421 expedition, he visited Malacca, Aru, Sumatra, Trincomalee, Ceylon, Kochi, Calicut, Zufar and Hormuz.

In the 1431 expedition, he visited Bengal, Chittagong, Sonargaon, Gaur and Calicut. From Calicut, he was sent by Eunuch Hong Bao as emissary to Mecca.

During his expeditions, Ma Huan took notes on the geography, politics, weather conditions, environment, economy, local customs, and even methods of punishment for criminals. Returning home on his first expedition, he began writing a book on his expedition, the first draft of which was ready around 1416. He expanded and modified his draft during later expeditions, the final version was finalized around 1451. The title of his book was Yingya Shenglan (The Overall Survey of the Ocean's Shores).

During the Ming dynasty and Qing dynasty, there were many printed and handcopied editions. The latest authentic text of a printed version was edited and annotated by historian Feng Chengjun. A newer edition, based on Ming dynasty handcopied editions, was recently published by Ocean Publishing House in China.

An annotated English translation by J.V.G. Mills (1887–1987) was published by the Hakluyt Society in 1970, and reprinted in 1997 by The White Lotus Press in Bangkok. Mills's translation was based on the edition by Feng Cheng jun.

The Yingya Shenglan is considered by sinologists worldwide as a primary source for the history of Ming dynasty naval exploration, history of South East Asia and history of India.

Some scholars who have done research work on Ma Huan are J.J.L. Duyvendak, F. Hirth, Paul Pelliot, Feng Chengjun, Xiang Da, J.V.G. Mills.

== See also ==
- Fei Xin, another participants of Zheng He's expeditions who wrote a book
- The "Mao Kun map" in Wubei Zhi
