= Fei Xin =

Ming dynasty explorer and writer

- Born: Fei Xin c. 1385/1388; Kunshan, Jiangsu, China
- Died: after 1436
- Occupations: Military personnel, Explorer, Writer
- Writing career
- Language: Chinese, Arabic
- Notable work: Xingcha Shenglan (lit. 'Description of the Starry Raft')

Fei Xin (simplified Chinese: 费信; traditional Chinese: 費信; c. 1385/1388 - after 1436) was a member of the military personnel of the fleet of the Ming dynasty admiral Zheng He, known as the author of a book about the countries visited by Chinese ships.

== Biography ==
Little is known about Fei Xin's life. His family originated from Kunshan, in today's Jiangsu Province. Based on other dates mentioned by him, it is likely that he was born in the 17th year of the Hongwu era (1385), although some authors' calculation give 1388 as the date of his birth. He taught himself the Arabic language.

According to what Fei Xin says in the preface to his book, his family was poor. His older brother was called up to serve at the nearby Taicang garrison, but soon died, and young Fei Xin took his place, in or after 1398. J.J.L. Duyvendak speculated that the Fei brothers had been conscripted as a punishment for some political or other offense of their father or grandfather; there is no actual proof of that, but Fei Xin's later biographer, Roderich Ptak, thought that that wasn't impossible.

While a soldier, he managed to find time for study. Taicang being the lower-Yangtze base of the Zheng He fleet, Fei Xin ended up sailing with the fleet to the South-East Asia and the Indian Ocean four times.

Fei Xin is primarily known as the author of the book Xingcha Shenglan (Description of the Starry Raft; preface dated 1436), in which he recorded what he had seen on his 4 voyages to the southern seas. There are no known mentions of his activities at later dates than 1436, and there is no information about the actual date of his death either.

According to Ptak, there is no reliable information about Fei Xin's religion. Ptak believes that it is unlikely that Fei Xin was a Muslim, like Ma Huan or Zheng He himself. Fei Xin did conclude his book with the description of Mecca, but this may have been just an emulation of Ma Huan's book's layout.

Fei Xin's book exists in a number of different Ming-era editions. It has been studied by many Chinese and foreign historians. The first English translation of his book was made by William Woodville Rockhill, and published in the T'oung Pao in 1914-1915. (Note: Rockhill's work, covering also numerous other sources, appeared in several installments. One of them is this: W. W. Rockhill, "Notes on the Relations and Trade of China with the Eastern Archipelago and the Coast of the Indian Ocean during the Fourteenth Century. Part II". T'oung Pao, Second Series, Vol. 16, No. 1 (Mar., 1915), pp. 61–159.) The most recent translation, based on a draft by J.V.G. Mills, was edited and annotated by Roderich Ptak (1996).

== See also ==
- Ma Huan, another participant of Zheng He's expeditions, who wrote a book
- Chen Cheng (Ming Dynasty), a Chinese diplomat who left an account of his travels to Samarqand and Herat in the same time period
