= Gong Zhen =

Ming dynasty author, advisor, secretary, explorer

- 鞏珍
- Born: Near Nanjing, Jiangsu Province, Ming Dynasty China
- Occupations: Translator, Writer, Advisor
- Known for: Association with Admiral Zheng He, Author of Xiyang Fanguo Zhi

Gong Zhen (simplified Chinese: 巩珍; traditional Chinese: 鞏珍) was a fifteenth-century translator and writer famous for his association with the Chinese admiral Zheng He.

== Life ==
Born near Nanjing in present-day Jiangsu Province during the Ming dynasty (1368–1644), Gong Zhen's dates of birth and death are not recorded but it is known that his father was a soldier. Gong Zhen was first appointed as an advisor to the Xuande Emperor (r. 1425–1435), then in 1431 he became secretary to the admiral Zheng He.

Gong Zhen accompanied Zheng He on his voyages to the Western Ocean until 1433. His role was as advisor, translator and diarist in the various countries that Zheng He's treasure fleet visited.

Gong Zhen is best known as the author of Xiyang Fanguo Zhi (西洋番国志; 西洋番國誌; 'The Annals of Foreign Nations in the Western Ocean') published in 1434.
