= Jinghai (disambiguation) =

Jinghai District, formerly Jinghai County, is a district of Tianjin, China.

- Jinghai Town, the seat of Jinghai District

Jinghai may also refer to:

- Tĩnh Hải quân or Jinghai Circuit, Tang dynasty military command in modern Vietnam
- Jinghai County (Nantong), historical county in modern Nantong, China
- Jinghai station, Wuxi metro
- Jinghai Temple, Nanjing, China
