= Haimen, Nantong =

Haimen 海门区
- District
- Nickname: The River Gateway to the Sea (江海门户)
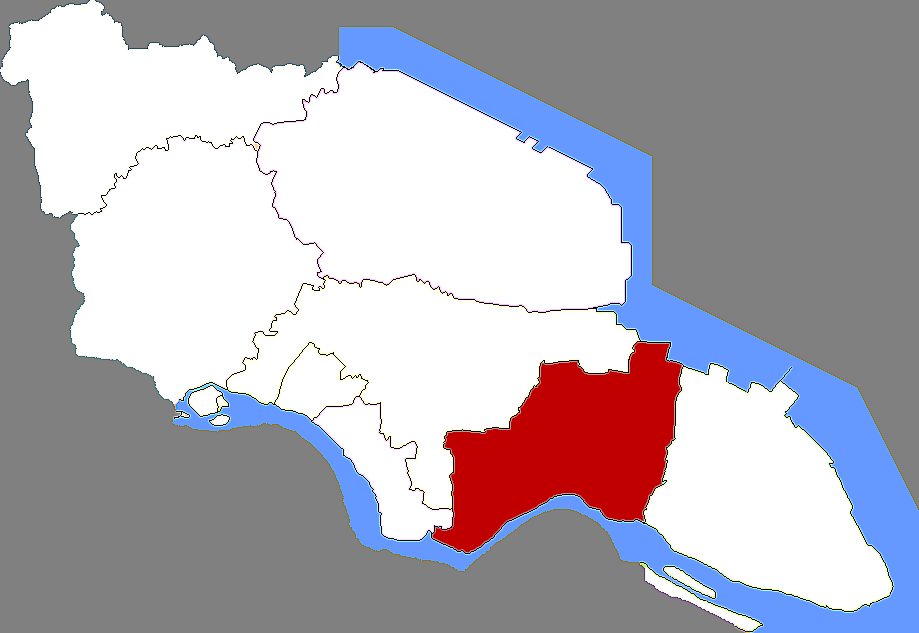
- Haimen in Nantong

- Location of the city center in Jiangsu
- Coordinates: 31°52′08″N 121°10′55″E
- Country: People's Republic of China
- Province: Jiangsu
- Prefecture-level city: Nantong
- Established (as a county): 958
- Became independent subprefecture: 1768
- Became county-level city: June 1994
- Became district: July 2020
- Seat: Haimen Town

Government
  - Deputy Mayor: Lu Yifei (陆一飞) (Chinese Communist Party)

Area
  - Total: 1,148.77 km^{2} (443.54 sq mi)
- Elevation: 4.96 m (16.3 ft)
- Highest elevation: 5.2 m (17 ft)
- Lowest elevation: 2.5 m (8.2 ft)

Population (2020 census)
  - Total: 991,782
  - Density: 863.343/km^{2} (2,236.05/sq mi)
- Time zone: UTC+8 (China Standard)
- Postal code: 226100
- Area code: 0513
- Website: www.haimen.gov.cn

Haimen (simplified Chinese: 海门; traditional Chinese: 海門; pinyin: Hǎimén; lit. 'sea gate', Qihai dialect: [haɪ.məŋ], Shanghai: [hɛ̝.məŋ]) is a district of Nantong, Jiangsu province. Located on the northern bank of the Yangtze River estuary, it faces Shanghai across the river. Renowned as the "Gateway to the Yangtze River and the Yellow Sea" and "Little-Pudong", the district covers about 1,149 square kilometers and had a permanent population nearly 1 million in 2025. With its coastline along the Yangtze and the Yellow Sea, Haimen has historically been famous for fishing and salt production, and in modern times has developed into an important port-based industrial hub.

== History ==
The area that is now Haimen was formed from silt deposits from the Yangtze River. Several sandbanks, including Dongzhou (东洲; 東洲) and Buzhou (布洲), joined with the mainland in the Tang dynasty. In 958 CE, during the Later Zhou dynasty in the Five Dynasties and Ten Kingdoms period, Haimen County was established with the county seat at Dongzhou Town. At this time, Haimen and Jinghai District (静海) were merged into the newly formed Tongzhou District (通州).

Because the mouth of the Yangtze River moved northward during the Ming dynasty, Haimen has dealt with flooding that destroyed parts of the county, including Lüsi (吕四; 呂四), Yudong (余东; 余東), and Sijia (Chinese: 四甲).

In 1672, under the Kangxi Emperor of the Qing dynasty, the seat moved to Jinghai Township (静海乡; 靜海鄉). Starting from 1701, the river's course moved south, creating more than 40 new sandbanks. In 1768, the county became an independent subprefecture with the seat moving to Maojia Town (茅家镇; 茅家鎮).

In the late Qing period, the industrialist Zhang Jian was born in Changle Town, Haimen. In 1895, he founded the Dasheng Cotton Mill, which spurred the rise of China's modern textile industry and helped make Haimen and Nantong major centers of commerce and industry.

In 1912, one year after the Republic of China was founded, Haimen once again became a county. However, in 1949, when the People's Republic of China was founded, Haimen became governed under Nantong Prefecture. Once county-level governments started to reappear in 1983, Haimen was reinstated as a county, and in June 1994, Haimen became a county-level city.

In 2020, Haimen became a district of Nantong.

== Economy ==
Haimen District is one of the economically strong districts along the Yangtze River in Jiangsu Province. In 2023, the regional GDP reached 16.9 billion RMB, representing a 6% increase. General public budget revenue was 750 million RMB, actual foreign investment reached US$360 million, construction output was 22.33 billion RMB, and total imports and exports reached 32.24 billion RMB, of which cross-border e-commerce accounted for 6.37 billion RMB. In 2024, the official plan projected GDP of 17.72 billion RMB, a 6.5% growth, with the per capita disposable income of urban residents expected to reach 67,400 RMB.

Haimen has long been noted for textiles, garments, and the construction industry, and holds titles such as "Hometown of Elevators in China" and "Hometown of Construction".

== Culture and Education ==
Haimen has long been celebrated as the "hometown of education." Notable figures include industrialist Zhang Jian, who was born in Haimen and not only advanced modern textile industry but also founded institutions such as Nantong Normal School and Nantong Museum.

== Geography ==
=== Climate ===
According to the Köppen climate classification system, Haimen has a humid subtropical climate (Cwa). This means that Haimen experiences four distinct seasons; the summers are hot and the winters are cold. The summers are rainier than the other seasons, and the summer rains usually bring flooding.

The average temperature is 15.2 °C (59.4 °F) in Haimen. January is the coldest month, and July is the hottest month. The hottest temperature recorded in Haimen was 39.7 °C (103.5 °F), occurring on August 8 2013. The coldest temperature ever recorded was −9.4 °C (15.1 °F) on January 8, 2021.

The average yearly rainfall is 1,056.3 millimetres (41.59 in). The wettest year was 1975 with 1,500.7 millimetres (59.08 in), and the driest year was 1978 with 654.6 millimetres (25.77 in).

Climate data for Haimen, elevation 3 m (9.8 ft), (1991–2020 normals, extremes 1981–present)
| Month | Jan | Feb | Mar | Apr | May | Jun | Jul | Aug | Sep | Oct | Nov | Dec | Year |
|---|---|---|---|---|---|---|---|---|---|---|---|---|---|
| Record high °C (°F) | 20.1 (68.2) | 25.5 (77.9) | 32.5 (90.5) | 32.8 (91.0) | 34.1 (93.4) | 36.8 (98.2) | 38.0 (100.4) | 39.7 (103.5) | 37.1 (98.8) | 32.6 (90.7) | 27.9 (82.2) | 21.9 (71.4) | 39.7 (103.5) |
| Mean daily maximum °C (°F) | 7.5 (45.5) | 9.6 (49.3) | 13.9 (57.0) | 19.8 (67.6) | 25.1 (77.2) | 27.8 (82.0) | 31.8 (89.2) | 31.4 (88.5) | 27.6 (81.7) | 22.8 (73.0) | 16.9 (62.4) | 10.3 (50.5) | 20.4 (68.7) |
| Daily mean °C (°F) | 3.5 (38.3) | 5.2 (41.4) | 9.2 (48.6) | 14.6 (58.3) | 20.0 (68.0) | 23.7 (74.7) | 27.9 (82.2) | 27.4 (81.3) | 23.3 (73.9) | 18.0 (64.4) | 12.2 (54.0) | 5.9 (42.6) | 15.9 (60.6) |
| Mean daily minimum °C (°F) | 0.3 (32.5) | 1.7 (35.1) | 5.2 (41.4) | 10.0 (50.0) | 15.7 (60.3) | 20.4 (68.7) | 24.7 (76.5) | 24.5 (76.1) | 19.9 (67.8) | 14.0 (57.2) | 8.3 (46.9) | 2.3 (36.1) | 12.3 (54.1) |
| Record low °C (°F) | −9.4 (15.1) | −7.1 (19.2) | −3.8 (25.2) | −1.0 (30.2) | 5.5 (41.9) | 11.1 (52.0) | 16.9 (62.4) | 16.1 (61.0) | 10.7 (51.3) | 3.0 (37.4) | −2.9 (26.8) | −8.5 (16.7) | −9.4 (15.1) |
| Average precipitation mm (inches) | 56.6 (2.23) | 53.3 (2.10) | 74.0 (2.91) | 69.0 (2.72) | 84.1 (3.31) | 210.1 (8.27) | 162.5 (6.40) | 192.4 (7.57) | 100 (3.9) | 55.2 (2.17) | 53.4 (2.10) | 37.8 (1.49) | 1,148.4 (45.17) |
| Average precipitation days (≥ 0.1 mm) | 9.7 | 9.5 | 11.0 | 10.7 | 11.0 | 13.3 | 12.4 | 12.5 | 9.5 | 7.3 | 8.7 | 7.8 | 123.4 |
| Average snowy days | 2.2 | 1.8 | 0.7 | 0 | 0 | 0 | 0 | 0 | 0 | 0 | 0.1 | 0.7 | 5.5 |
| Average relative humidity (%) | 77 | 78 | 77 | 77 | 77 | 82 | 82 | 84 | 82 | 78 | 78 | 75 | 79 |
| Mean monthly sunshine hours | 128.3 | 128.2 | 154.6 | 179.5 | 189.1 | 139.2 | 195.3 | 209.7 | 180.6 | 176.5 | 145.9 | 145.1 | 1,972 |
| Percentage possible sunshine | 40 | 41 | 42 | 46 | 44 | 33 | 45 | 51 | 49 | 51 | 47 | 47 | 45 |
Source: China Meteorological Administration

=== Parks ===
- Jianghai garden

== Administrative divisions ==
Haimen is divided into twenty-one towns and one township, the pene-exclave of Haiyong on Chongming. These towns are further divided into 231 villages and three fish villages.

21 towns

- Haimen (海门镇)
- Sanxing (三星镇)
- Desheng (德胜镇)
- Sanchang (三厂镇)
- Changle (常乐镇)
- Qilin (麒麟镇)
- Yuelai (悦来镇)
- Wannian (万年镇)
- Sanyang (三阳镇)
- Sijia (四甲镇)
- Huolong (货隆镇)
- Yudong (余东镇)
- Zhengyu (正余镇)
- Baochang (包场镇)
- Liuhao (刘浩镇)
- Linjiang (临江镇)
- Wanghao (王浩镇)
- Shuxun (树勋镇)
- Dongzaogang (东灶港镇)

1 township

- Haiyong (海永乡)

- It is only township and its area is 9 km^{2} (3.5 sq mi). It is pene-enclave on Chongming Island, most of which belongs to Shanghai.

== Transport ==
With easy access to the Sea and Yangtze River, transportation is very convenient. Less than 2 hours driving distance to Shanghai Pudong International Airport, about 40 mins driving distance to Nantong Xingdong Airport and Nantong Railway Station, which has high speed bullet train. There are multiple entries to the national Highway system, e.g. G40 Expressway. Close to Port of Nantong, Haimen is currently developing its own county level sea port in DongZaoGang town. There is an easy access to Sutong Yangtze River Bridge to cross the Yangtze, as well as ferry service.

Haimen railway station opened in 2019 as an intermediate stop on the Nanjing–Qidong railway.

== See also ==
- Haimen folk song
