= Haimen folk song =

Haimen folk song is popular in the sea sand area of Haimen. It is the production condition of local operas and also a kind of wu song. Haimen folk songs are divided into two kinds: one kind is impromptu folk songs, mostly appearing in the field of life or in the operation, freely into; The second is the narrative folk songs with lyrics having more than ten sentences, dozens of sentences, and even hundreds of words. The melody is beautiful, simple, pure, fresh, smooth with dense agrestic breath. It has distinctive local characteristics with a history of over 500 years. The Haimen veteran sir of Culture education, GuanJianGe, gathered a large number haimen folk songs in his holiday, and selected 100 songs, then integrated Love Songs in Estuary (江口情歌), which published by the Summer university.

== Essential information ==
- Cultural heritage name: Haimen folk songs
- Subordinate area: Jiangsu · Nantong · Haimen
- Haimen folk heritage Numbers: II-3
- Heritage category: Folk music
- Filing date: 2006
- Claimants/declaration units: Nantong Haimen
- Heritage levels: Province

== Development history ==
Haimen folk song has been recorded in Haimen county annals in Ming Dynasty (AD 958). At that time, people in the labor life produced haimen early folk song which was known then as the folk songs. In 1957, Haimen folk song Rice Remember (淘米记) was regarded as the national folk song to perform in Beijing, which received Zhou Enlai (周恩来) and Zhu De's (朱德) kind interview. In 1958, the county government established Haimen folk song troupe in order to protect the inheritance haimen folk songs and large optimize local culture. Each year, the troupe performed more than 100 games in Beijing, Shanghai and surrounding counties. In 1987, Haimen Folk Song Anthology (海门山歌选) was published by China federation press. Besides, it has emerged a great number of outstanding works of folk songs. Little Aig Sister Saw YaoChuan Lang (小阿姐看中摇船郎) was one of the representative works. The edited folk song sang well into the Beijing and the MTV music television was broadcast in Europe TV. In 1984, the production condition of the folk song was established. In August 1985, haimen county held the first folk song party. More than 50 folk singers sang more than 40 songs. Guangming Daily and Xinhua Daily reported this. In July 1986, Song WeiXiang sang Haimen folk song Little Aig Sister Saw YaoChuan Lang (小阿姐看中摇船郎), followed Nantong folk art to perform in Beijing. In 1987, Haimen Folk Song Anthology (海门山歌选), included more than 250 folk songs, was published by the China folk literature and art publishing house. In 1993, the troupe went to Beijing for the second time and succeeded in performing The Green Dragon horn(青龙角). In 2207, the folk song entered into the list of Jiangsu province intangible cultural heritage protection. On August 19, 2007 to 21, China. Haimen folk festival was held, which marked the folk culture developed to a new stage of development. On June 14, 2008, haimen folk song officially listed in national "intangible cultural heritage".

== Cultural transmission ==
It is reported that the China haimen folk songs set totally adds up to nine kinds, nearly 250 songs and 50 operas, containing 89 new piece of folk music, 18 opera and mountain singers introduced, etc. The book collection, compiled from work started in April 2007. Acquisition team visited the local old singers for more than 100 people. Through the various forms, it collected more than 1000 songs, the Haozi, compositions for an instrument and other valuable information.
