= Jinghai County (Nantong) =

Former county in Jiangsu, China

Jinghai (Chinese: 静海; pinyin: Jìnghǎi) was a historic county that existed on the northern bank of the Yangtze River Delta in what is now the city of Nantong in Jiangsu, China.

In the 5th century CE, the sandbar of Hudouzhou emerged in the Yangtze River Delta. In the late Tang dynasty, Hudouzhou became connected to the north bank of the Yangtze River, and was named Jinghai. Jinghai Military Commission was established in the area, which was controlled by a family with the surname Yao for half a century. The economy was based on agriculture and salt production, and a city wall was built around the main settlement. In 958, the Later Zhou dynasty established the Tongzhou Prefecture, with Jinghai and Haimen as its subordinate counties. Jinghai was expanded as the capital of the prefecture, and eventually became known as Tongzhou. After the Xinhai Revolution in 1911, prefectures were abolished and Tongzhou was renamed Nantong.
