= Sanbao taijian xia Xiyang ji tongsu yanyi =

16th-century Chinese novel

Chapter one of the 100 chapter Ming dynasty novel Sanbao taijian xia Xiyang ji tongsu yanyi

Inside pages from volume two of Sanbao taijian xiyang ji

Sanbao taijian xia Xiyang ji tongsu yanyi (traditional Chinese: 三寶太監西洋記; simplified Chinese: 三宝太监西洋记; in English Popular Romance of the Record of the Three-Jeweled Eunuch Descending Upon the Western Sea, The Eunuch Sanbao's Voyage to the Western Ocean or The Journey of Sanbao the Eunuch to the Western Ocean) is a classic Chinese novel written by Luo Maodeng (羅懋登) in the late 16th century during the Ming dynasty. It is a fictionalized account of the voyages of admiral Zheng He and the Chinese treasure fleet, blending the historical story with fantastic elements involving monsters and supernatural beings.
