= Jianghai garden =

Park in Nantong, Jiangsu, China

Coordinates: 31.8258°N 121.1678°E

Jianghai garden (Chinese: 江海风情园) is a cultural and natural ecologically friendly park. It lies in the south of Haimen, Nantong, near the Yangtze River.

Jianghai garden is established by Sanchang professional high school of Haimen. It covers 350 hectares. It visually shows the agricultural civilization of Haimen's past, present and future. It was completed after two years' construction.

It is an experimental park for middle and primary school's quality-oriented education in Nantong, which provides students with an extracurricular activities camp. At the same time, it offers residents a place for entertainment.

The opening ceremony for the project's initial phase was in September 2001 or September 2002 and took ¥12 million to finish.

== Areas ==
- Jianghai folk culture area
- Traditional farming culture area
- modern agriculture demonstration area
- Future agriculture demonstration area
- Resident holiday recreational area
- Primary and middle school students' cognition and plowing trying area
- Agricultural professional education area
- Agricultural information and commerce area

== Attractions ==
- Grain tower (五谷塔), called as "the first tower in Haimen", is like a pagoda and straight into blue sky.
- Culture museum records the history of Haimen. There are special customs and tradition took on in the museum and many famous people's statues.
- Zhangjian, who is the number one scholar in the late Qing Dynasty, whose statue is exhibited there.
- Jianghai Renjia (江海人家), once peasants lived in, is a place you can experience the rural life.
- Water bridge, which is on the surface of water, is very long.
