= Hudouzhou =

Hudouzhou Island (Chinese: 胡逗洲; pinyin: Húdòuzhōu) was a sandbar island in Yangtze River Delta. The island was inhabited by Chinese during the 5th century AD and used as a penal colony where criminals were sent to work in salt fields. The settlement of Tongzhou (Chinese: 通州; pinyin: Tōngzhōu), which developed into modern day Nantong, was founded on Hudouzhou. In the late Tang period, Hudouzhou ceased to exist as an island when it merged with land on the north bank of the Yangtze River, and the territory became part of the newly formed Jinghai District (Chinese: 静海; pinyin: Jìnghǎi).
