= Edward L. Dreyer =

American historian (1940–2007)

Edward L. Dreyer (1940–2007) was an American historian known for his work and expertise on the history of China's Ming dynasty.

== Early life and education ==
Dreyer was born in 1940 in San Diego. He earned his BA in history from Harvard University in 1961 and his Ph.D. from Harvard with a thesis on The Emergence of Chu Yuan-chang, 1360–65. His thesis advisors were John Fairbank and Lien-sheng Yang.

== Career ==
Dreyer spent most of his career at the University of Miami, where he was a professor of history from 1970 to 2007. He authored a number of books and papers on various aspects of the Ming state, including its formative years and its military and naval history, including a chapter, "Military origins of Ming China" in The Cambridge History of China (vol. 7, part 1).

Dreyer was a leading global authority on the Battle of Lake Poyang and the expeditions of Zheng He.

== Personal life ==
Dreyer was married to June Teufel Dreyer, a China expert at the University of Miami and president of the American Association for Chinese Studies (AACS).
