= Jinghai Temple =

Buddhist temple in Nanjing, China

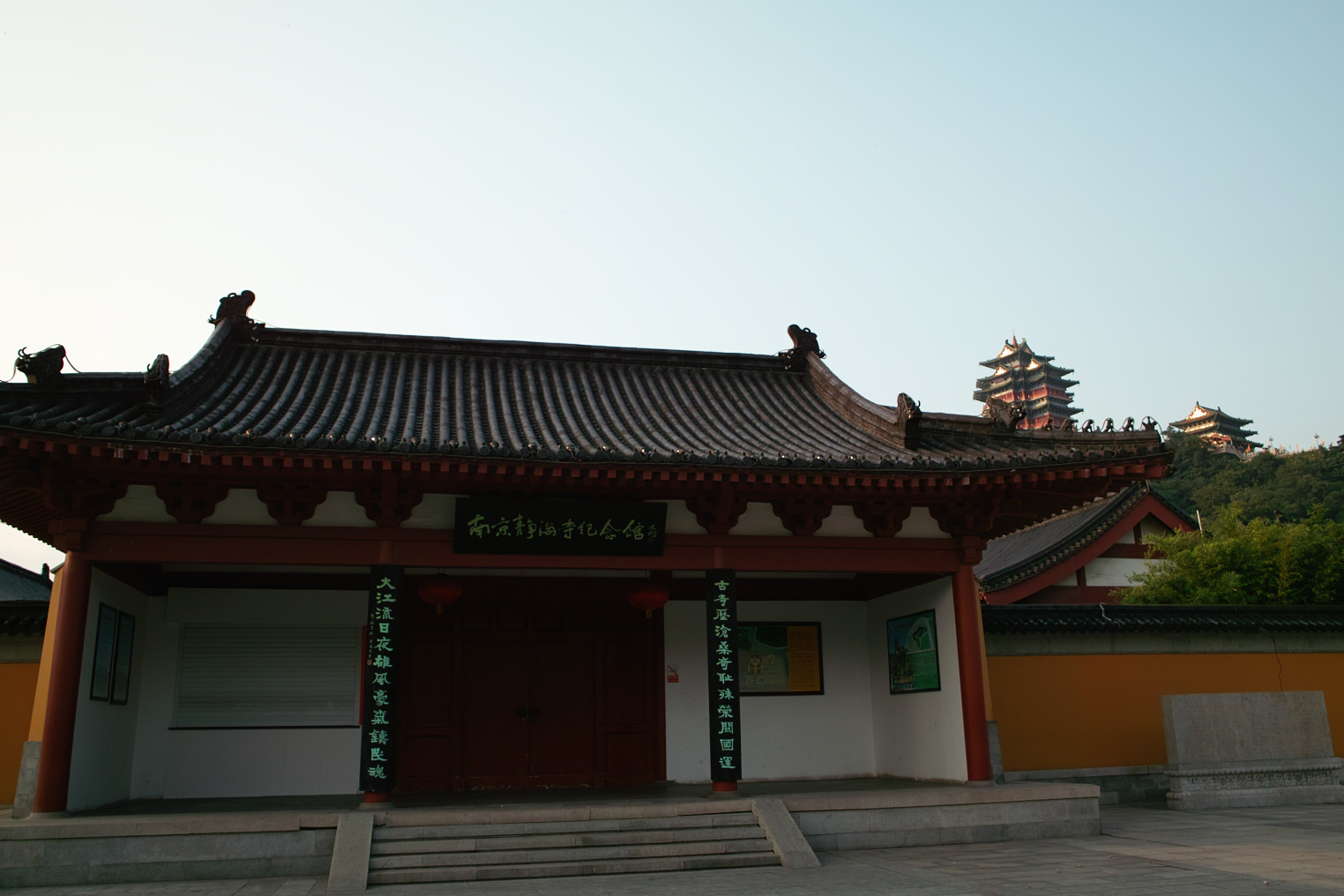
- A picture of Jinghaisi Museum

- Location in Nanjing, Jiangsu, China

Religion
- Affiliation: Buddhism

Location
- Country: China
- Coordinates: 32°05′39″N 118°44′28″E

Architecture
- Completed: 1842

Jinghai Temple (Chinese: 静海寺; pinyin: Jìnghǎi Sì) is a 15th-century temple located in Nanjing, Jiangsu, China, to the southwest of Shizi Mountain (Chinese: 狮子山). It was built to commemorate the voyage of Zheng He in the Ming Dynasty. The terms of the Treaty of Nanking were discussed in the temple. It was destroyed and rebuilt thrice, during the Taiping Rebellion and the Second Sino-Japanese War. In 1988, it was rebuilt on its original site. In 1990, the temple became home to the Historical Exhibition Museum of the Treaty of Nanking. After two expansions in 1996 and 2005, it is now the Nanjing Jinghai Temple Memorial, with material related to both Zheng He's voyage and the Treaty of Nanking. It is a National 4A Level Scenic Spot, as well as part of the National Patriotism Education Base, and the Nanjing Relic Protection Unit.

== History ==
Jinghai Temple (Temple of the Calm Sea) was built in 1416 by the Yongle Emperor of the Ming dynasty to honor Zheng He, a court eunuch, explorer, and envoy, who traveled to India and sailed as far as the east coast of Africa several times. It was one of Nanjing's largest and most lavishly decorated temples, originally built as a dedication to the Goddess of the Sea, Tianfei. It was named by the Emperor after a young woman from the Fujian province who miraculously rescued sailors whose boats had gone adrift on the high seas.

In June 1840, Great Britain declared war on China, the First Opium War, and in 1842, British troops invaded Nanjing. The Qing government discussed a treaty with the British government four times in Jinghai Temple. On August 29, the Qing government signed the Nanjing Treaty, which is the first unequal treaty in modern Chinese history, on a British navy ship. Therefore, Jinghai Temple became a symbol of the beginning of Chinese modern history.

By the time of the Republican Period, after the Taiping Rebellion and the destruction of traditional architecture during the Cultural Revolution, the temple had almost disappeared. The only remaining part of the original temple is a stele which was built and inscribed by the Yongle emperor himself. The museum was built next to a large outcropping rock known as Sansuyan (Three Night Crag) where the Southern Song general Yu Yunwen moored his fleet for three nights on his return trip after defeating the Jin army in Anhui province. It is also a place that offers the Arhat portraits of Buddha, relics of the Buddha and jade wares, etc. Jinghai literally means "peace and ocean" in Chinese, which indicates blessings for the people who are at sea.

During the past five centuries, Jinghai Temple has undergone disasters and warfare. In 1987, it was rebuilt to 628 square meters in the style of the Ming dynasty. Since it could not be the same as the original one, Jinghai Temple was called Old Jinghai Temple Site. In 1990, the Nanjing government decided to make it a public place, Nanjing Treaty Historical Exhibition Museum, in order to remind the Chinese people to not forget the history. At the end of 1996, to celebrate Hong Kong's return, the local government invested a significant amount to rebuild it a third time. It was expanded to 2800 square meters, emulating the Jiangnan garden style. In 1997, Jinghai Temple was honored as one of 100 National Patriotism Education Bases.
