= Battle of Palembang =

1942 World War II battle; Japanese victory

- Part of World War II, Pacific War
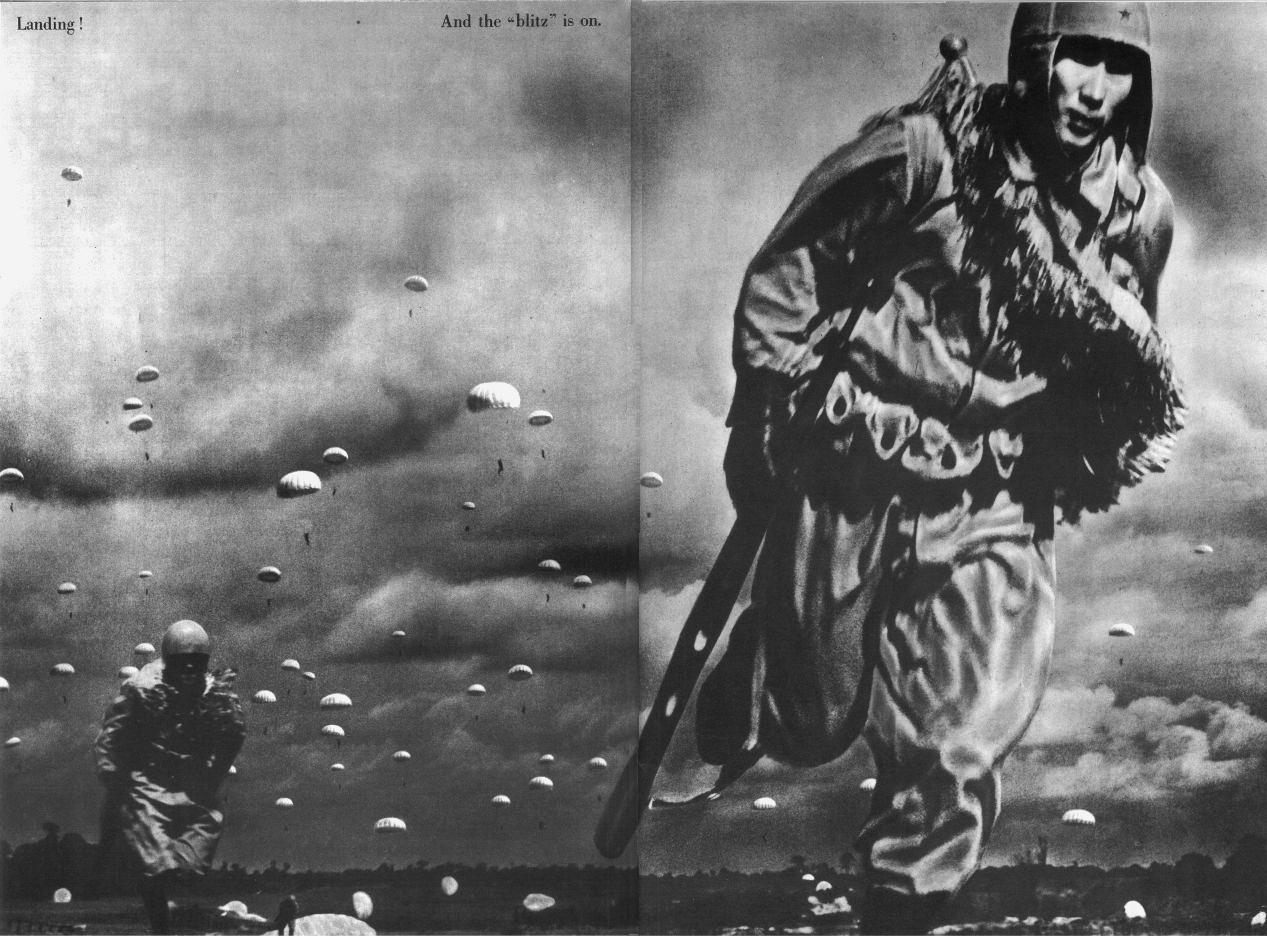
- Japanese paratroopers landing at Palembang
Date	13–15 February 1942
Location	Palembang, southern part of Sumatra Island, Dutch East Indies 2°59′10″S 104°45′20″E
Result	Japanese victory

Belligerents
Netherlands; United Kingdom; Australia; New Zealand	Japan

Commanders and leaders
(Dutch government-in-exile) L.N.W. Vogelesang (Dutch government-in-exile) Karel Doorman (United Kingdom) Henry Hunter (United Kingdom) Stanley Vincent	(Empire of Japan) Jisaburo Ozawa (Empire of Japan) Yoshisaburô Tanaka (Empire of Japan) Seiichi Kume

Units involved
ABDA Command: NL East Indies Army; ABDA naval force; No. 225 Bomber Group; No. 226 Fighter Group	(Empire of Japan) Army Air Force: 2nd Parachute Regiment; 59th, 64th, 98th Sentai; (Empire of Japan) Imperial Navy: 229th Infantry Regiment; 230th Infantry Regiment

Strength
2,000 infantry 50 aircraft	3,000 amphibious force 350 paratroopers 3 squadrons transports 1 bomber group 2 fighter groups

The Battle of Palembang was a battle of the Pacific theatre of World War II. It occurred near Palembang, on Sumatra, on 13–15 February 1942. The Royal Dutch Shell oil refineries at nearby Plaju (then Pladjoe) were the major objectives for the Empire of Japan in the Pacific War, because of an oil embargo imposed on Japan by the United States, the Netherlands, and the United Kingdom after the Japanese invaded China. With the area's abundant fuel supply and airfield, Palembang offered significant potential as a military base to both the Allies and the Japanese.

== Prelude ==
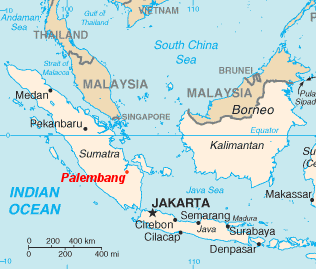
Palembang location. The map shows the current border, where Indonesia area was then the Dutch East Indies.

The Dutch destroyed the Pangkalan, Soesoe, and Pangkalan Brandon oil fields, concentrating their defenses around the oil fields of Palembang, Langkat, and Djambi. The high octane aviation fuel at Palembang was the target of the Japanese 38th Division after landing at the mouth of the Musi River.

In January, the American-British-Dutch-Australian Command (ABDACOM) decided to concentrate Allied air forces in Sumatra at two airfields near Palembang: Pangkalan Benteng, also known as "P1" and a secret air base at Prabumulih (then Praboemoelih), or "P2".

The British Royal Air Force created No. 225 (Bomber) Group at Palembang. It included two Royal Australian Air Force squadrons and a large number of Australians serving with British squadrons. The group could only muster 40 Bristol Blenheim light bombers and 35 Lockheed Hudson light bombers. The Blenheims had flown from the Middle East and Egypt, where they were considered too old to cope with newer German and Italian fighters. A handful of United States Far East Air Force B-17 Flying Fortress heavy bombers also operated out of Palembang briefly in January, but these were withdrawn to Java and Australia before the battle commenced.

No. 226 (Fighter) Group RAF also arrived at Palembang in early February: two squadrons of Hawker Hurricanes transported to Sumatra by the aircraft carrier HMS Indomitable. They were joined by the remnants of British, Australian and Royal New Zealand Air Force Hurricane and Brewster Buffalo squadrons, which had both inflicted and suffered heavy losses in intense air battles over the Malayan and Singapore campaigns.

The Royal Netherlands East Indies Army (KNIL) South Sumatra Island Territorial Command, its command in the Palembang area, consisted of about 2,000 troops under Lieutenant Colonel L. N. W. Vogelesang: the South Sumatra Garrison Battalion and a Stadswacht/Landstorm ("home guard/reserve") infantry company in Palembang, a Stadswacht/Landstorm infantry company in Jambi (Djambi), as well as various artillery and machine gun units. (KNIL units in other parts of Sumatra lacked mobility and played no part in the fighting.) The Royal Netherlands Navy was represented by the minelayer Pro Patria and the patrol boats P-38 and P-40 on the Musi river.

== Battle ==
=== Airborne attack ===
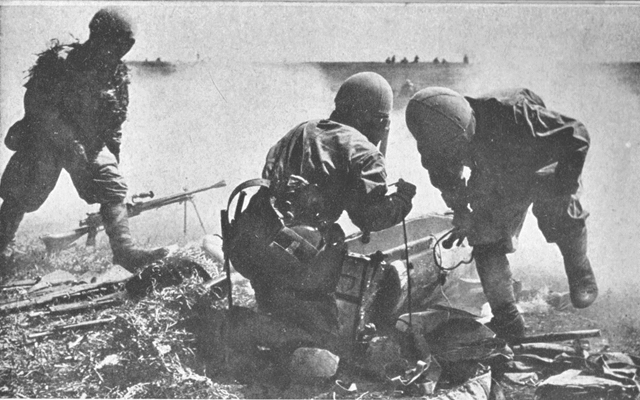
Japanese Army paratroopers retrieving their weapons during the Battle of Palembang

While the Allied planes attacked the Japanese ships on 13 February, Kawasaki Ki-56 transport planes of the 1st, 2nd and 3rd Chutai, Imperial Japanese Army Air Force (IJAAF), dropped Teishin Shudan (Raiding Group) paratroopers over Pangkalan Benteng airfield. At the same time Mitsubishi Ki-21 bombers from the 98th Sentai dropped supplies for paratroopers. The formation was escorted by a large force of Nakajima Ki-43 fighters from the 59th and 64th Sentai.

As many as 180 men from the Japanese Army 2nd Parachute Regiment, under Colonel Seiichi Kume, dropped between Palembang and Pangkalan Benteng, and more than 90 men came down west of the refineries at Pladjoe. Although the Japanese paratroopers failed to capture the Pangkalan Benteng airfield, they did manage to gain possession of the entire Pladjoe oil refinery complex undamaged. A makeshift counter-attack by Landstorm troops and anti-aircraft gunners from Praboemoelih managed to retake the complex but took heavy losses, due to Japanese soldiers entrenched in the refinery's air raid shelters. The planned demolition failed to do any serious damage to the refinery, but the oil stores were set ablaze. Two hours after the first drop, another 60 Japanese paratroopers were dropped near Pangkalan Benteng airfield.

On 14 February, the surviving Japanese paratroopers advanced to the Musi, Salang, and Telang Rivers, near Palembang.

=== Amphibious assault ===
The main Japanese invasion force, an amphibious assault fleet under Vice-Admiral Jisaburo Ozawa of the Imperial Japanese Navy (IJN), was on its way from Cam Ranh Bay in French Indochina. It was made up of the Imperial Japanese Army's 229th Infantry Regiment and one battalion from the 230th Infantry Regiment. A small advance party set out eight transports escorted by the light cruiser Sendai and four destroyers. The main force followed in 14 transports, escorted by the heavy cruiser Chokai and four destroyers. The covering force included the aircraft carrier Ryujo, four heavy cruisers, one light cruiser and three destroyers. Additional air cover was provided by land-based IJN planes and the IJAAF 3rd Air Division.

On the morning of 14 February, a river boat commandeered by the British Royal Navy, HMS Li Wo — under Lieutenant Thomas Wilkinson— ferrying personnel and equipment between Singapore and the Dutch East Indies, ran into the Japanese fleet. Although Li Wo was armed only with a 4-inch (100 mm) gun and two machine guns, its crew fired at the Japanese troop transport ships, setting one on fire and damaging several others, while under fire from the Japanese cruisers. This action continued for 90 minutes until the Li Wo ran out of ammunition. Wilkinson then ordered the ramming of the nearest transport, before his ship was destroyed by Japanese fire. Wilkinson received a posthumous Victoria Cross (VC), the highest award for gallantry in the British Commonwealth, and the only VC awarded in the Dutch East Indies campaign.

On 15 February, an ABDA naval force of five cruisers, HNLMS De Ruyter, HNLMS Java and HNLMS Tromp, HMS Exeter, HMAS Hobart and 10 destroyers, under Admiral Karel Doorman, made an abortive attempt to intercept the Japanese force. During the attempt, the HNLMS Van Ghent ran aground in the Gaspar Strait and had to be scuttled. Planes from Ryujo, the Mihoro Air Wing and Kanoya Air Group, made a series of attacks on the Allied ships, forcing them to withdraw through the Gaspar Strait.

On 15 February, 36 RAF and RAAF Lockheed Hudson's and Bristol Blenheim's, supported by 22 Hawker Hurricane's, attacked the Japanese convoys at the mouth of the Musi River. However, the attacks stopped once Japanese paratroopers captured P.1.

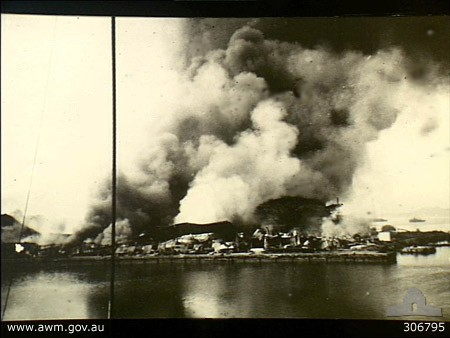
Port facilities at Oosthaven were destroyed by Allied troops as part of a scorched-earth policy

However, on the afternoon of 15 February, all Allied aircraft were ordered to Java, where a major Japanese attack was anticipated, and the Allied air units had withdrawn from southern Sumatra by the evening of 16 February 1942. Other personnel were evacuated via Oosthaven (now Bandar Lampung) by ships to Java or India.

The loss of Sumatra's oil fields left only Tjepoe on Java to supply the Allies.
