= Bumi Sriwijaya LRT station =

Railway station in Palembang, Indonesia

P07 Bumi Sriwijaya
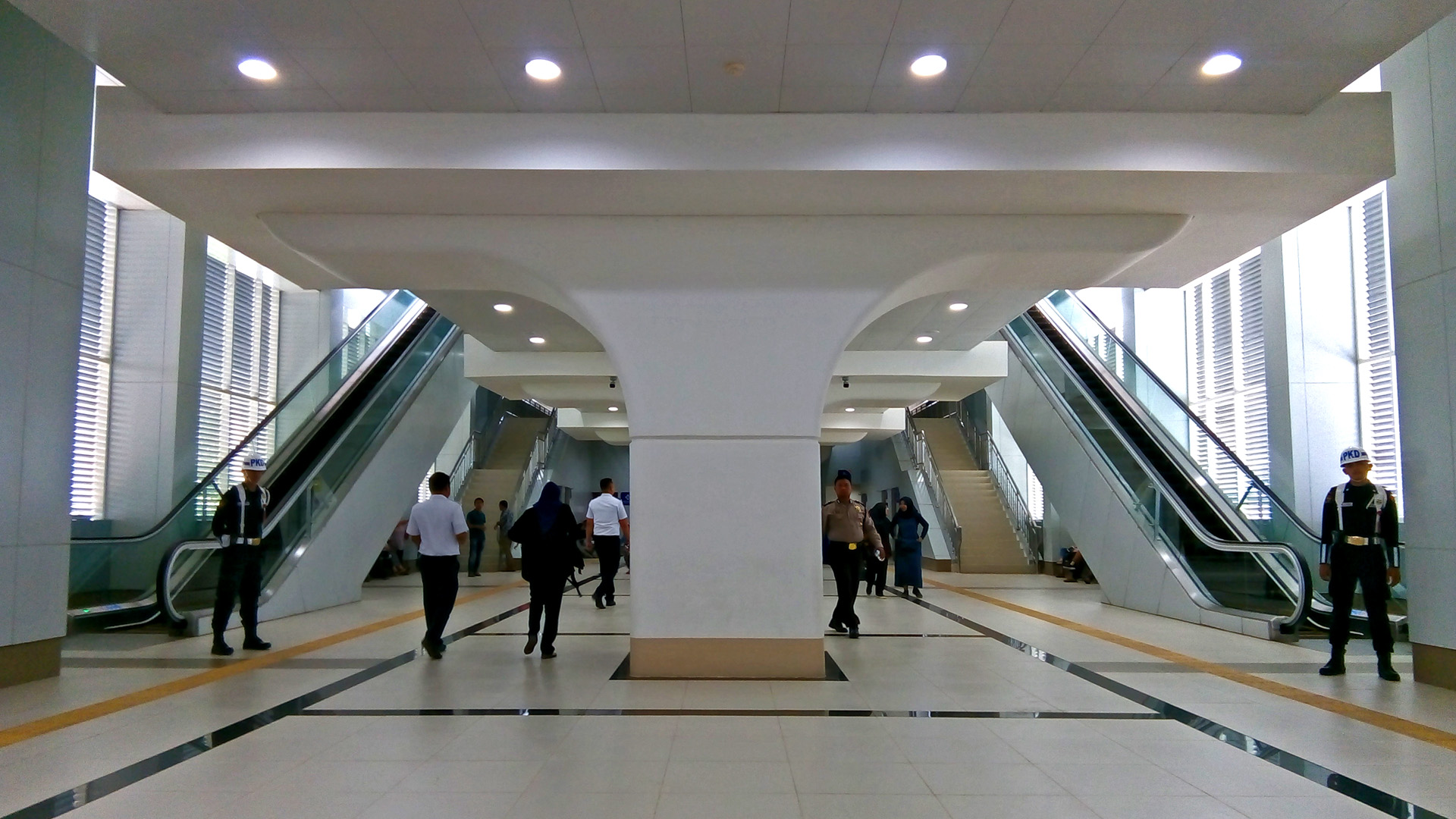
- Concourse level of Bumi Sriwijaya Station

General information
- Location: Jl. Angkatan 45, Lorok Pakjo, Ilir Barat I, Palembang; South Sumatra; Indonesia
- Coordinates: 2.977145°S 104.745244°E
- System: Palembang LRT station
- Owner: Indonesian Railway Company
- Operator: Indonesian Railway Company
- Line: Line 1
- Platforms: 2 side platforms
- Tracks: 2

Construction
- Structure type: Elevated
- Parking: none
- Cycle facilities: none
- Accessible: Available

Other information
- Station code: BUS

History
- Opened: 23 July 2018 trial 1 August 2018 full
- Former names: Palembang Icon Station

Services
| Preceding station | Palembang LRT | Following station |
|---|---|---|
| Demang towards SMB II | Line 1 | Dishub towards DJKA |
Location
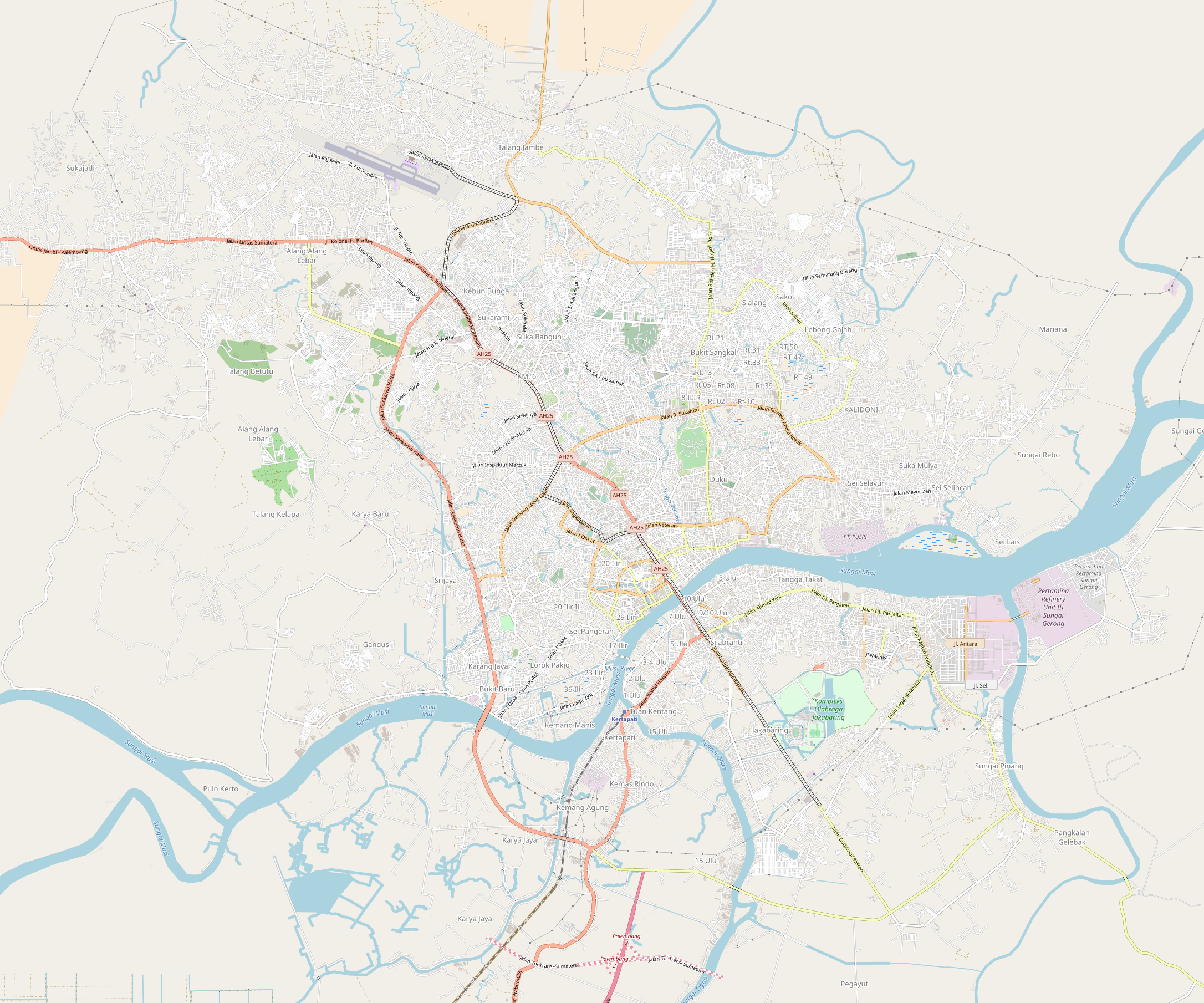
- Location within Palembang

Bumi Sriwijaya Station (formerly Palembang Icon Station) is a station of the Palembang LRT Line 1, located in Ilir Barat I, Palembang.

The station is close to the Bumi Sriwijaya Stadium and the Palembang Icon Mall. The station became one of six stations that opened at the Palembang LRT launch on 1 August 2018.

== Station layout ==
| 2F; Platforms | Side platform, doors will open on the right |
| 2F; Platforms | Platform 1 | LRT Line 1 towards DJKA → |
| 2F; Platforms | Platform 2 | ← LRT Line 1 towards SMB II |
| 2F; Platforms | Side platform, doors will open on the right |
| 1F | Concourse | Faregates, Ticket Booths, Station Control, Shops, Musalla |
| G | Street Level | Parking (plan) |
