= Punti Kayu LRT station =

Railway station in Indonesia

P03 Punti Kayu
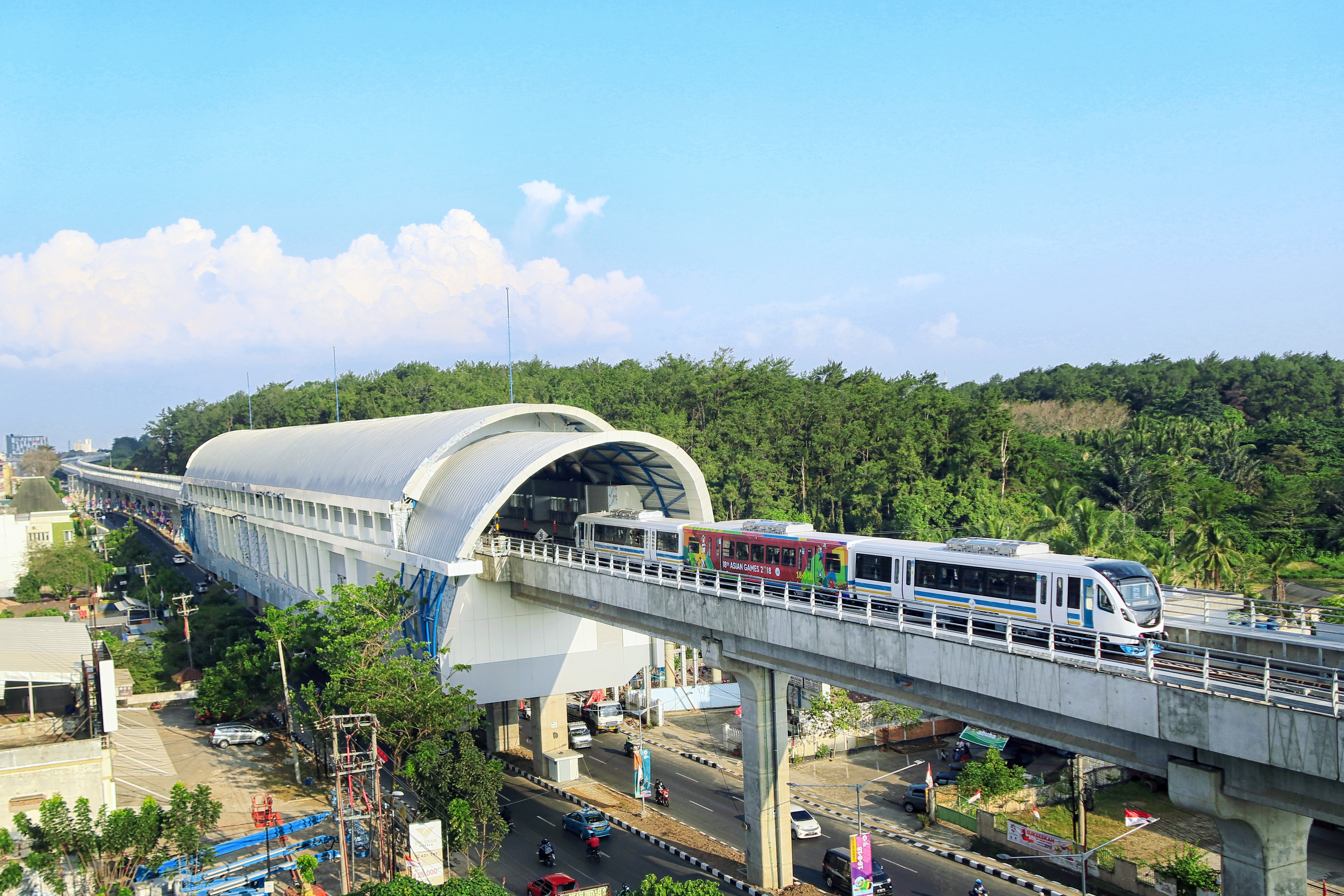
- A train passing directly at Punti Kayu Station, Photo was taken on 13 August 2018

General information
- Location: Jl. Kolonel H. Burlian, Karya Baru, Alang-Alang Lebar, Palembang; South Sumatra; Indonesia
- Coordinates: 2.940629°S 104.724311°E
- System: Palembang LRT station
- Owner: Indonesian Railway Company
- Operator: Indonesian Railway Company
- Line: Line 1
- Platforms: 2 side platforms
- Tracks: 2

Construction
- Structure type: Elevated
- Parking: none
- Cycle facilities: none
- Accessible: Available

Other information
- Station code: PUK

History
- Opened: 24 September 2018
- Former names: Telkom Station

Services
Preceding station	Palembang LRT	Following station
Asrama Haji towards SMB II	Line 1	RSUD towards DJKA
Location
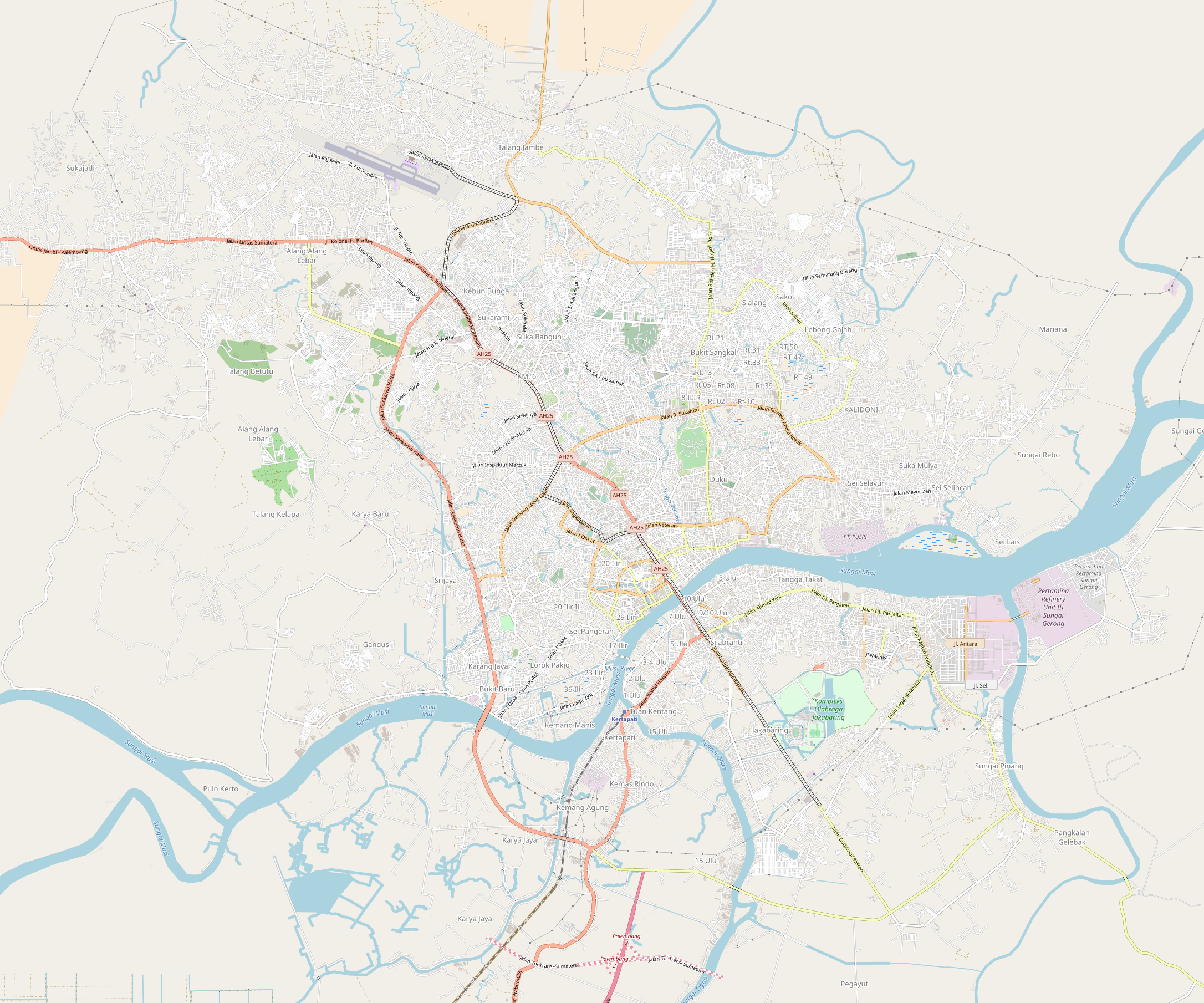
- Location within Palembang

Punti Kayu Station (formerly Telkom Station) is a station of the Palembang LRT Line 1 in Indonesia. The station is located between Asrama Haji station and RSUD station.

The station was opened on 24 September 2018, after the 2018 Asian Games had concluded.

== Station layout ==
2F; Platforms	Side platform, doors will open on the right
2F; Platforms	Platform 1	LRT Line 1 towards DJKA →
2F; Platforms	Platform 2	← LRT Line 1 towards SMB II
2F; Platforms	Side platform, doors will open on the right
1F	Concourse	Faregates, Ticket Booths, Station Control, Shops, Musalla
G	Street Level	Parking (plan)
