= Demang LRT station =

Railway station in Indonesia

P06 Demang
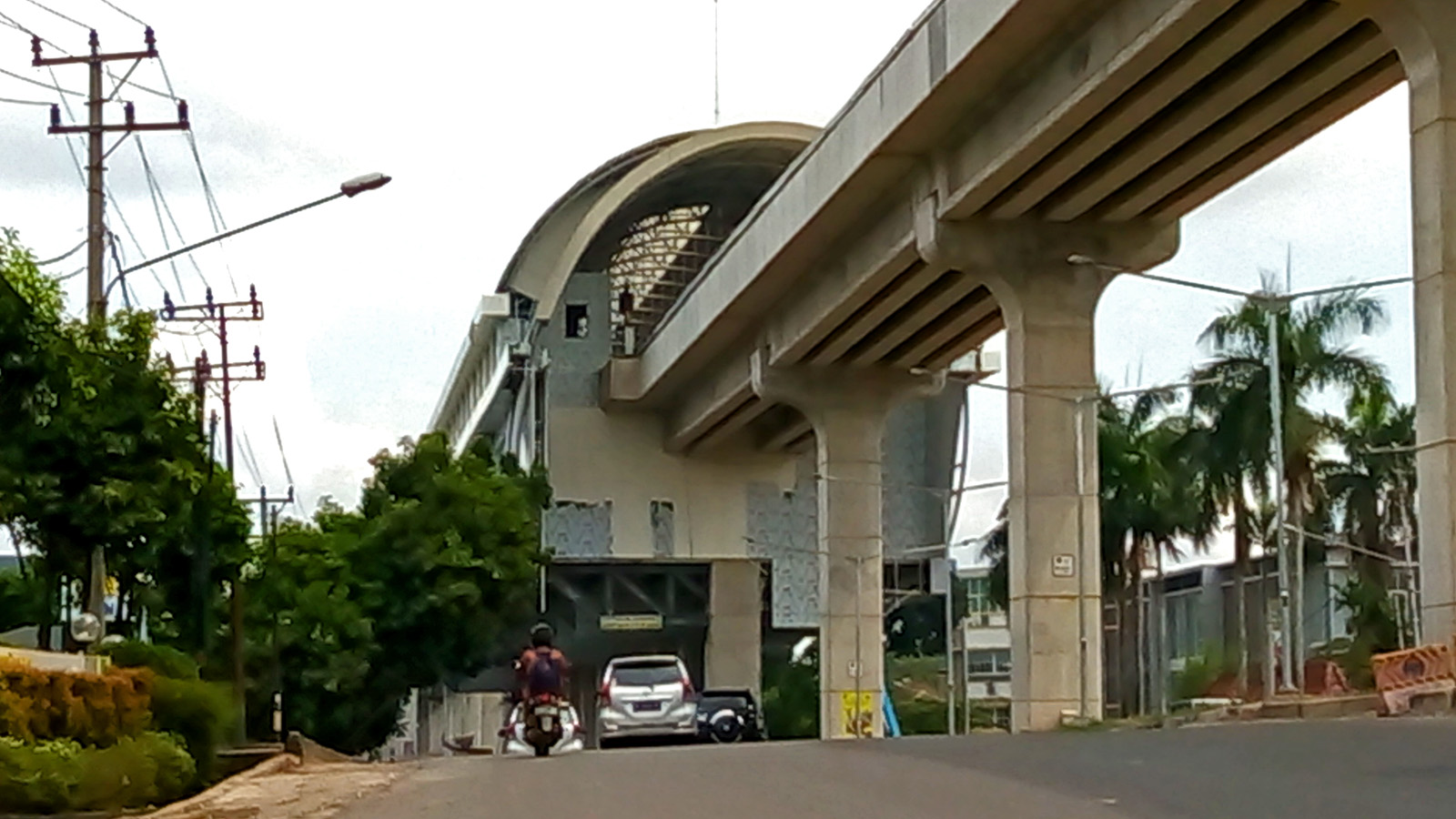
- The station under construction, photo was taken on 19 May 2018

General information
- Location: Jl. Demang Lebar Daun, Demang Lebar Daun, Ilir Barat I, Palembang; South Sumatra; Indonesia
- Coordinates: 2.964415°S 104.73588°E
- System: Palembang LRT station
- Owner: Indonesian Railway Company
- Operator: Indonesian Railway Company
- Line: Line 1
- Platforms: 2 side platforms
- Tracks: 2

Construction
- Structure type: Elevated
- Parking: none
- Cycle facilities: none
- Accessible: Available

Other information
- Station code: DMG

History
- Opened: 6 October 2018

Services
Preceding station	Palembang LRT	Following station
Garuda Dempo towards SMB II	Line 1	Bumi Sriwijaya towards DJKA
Location
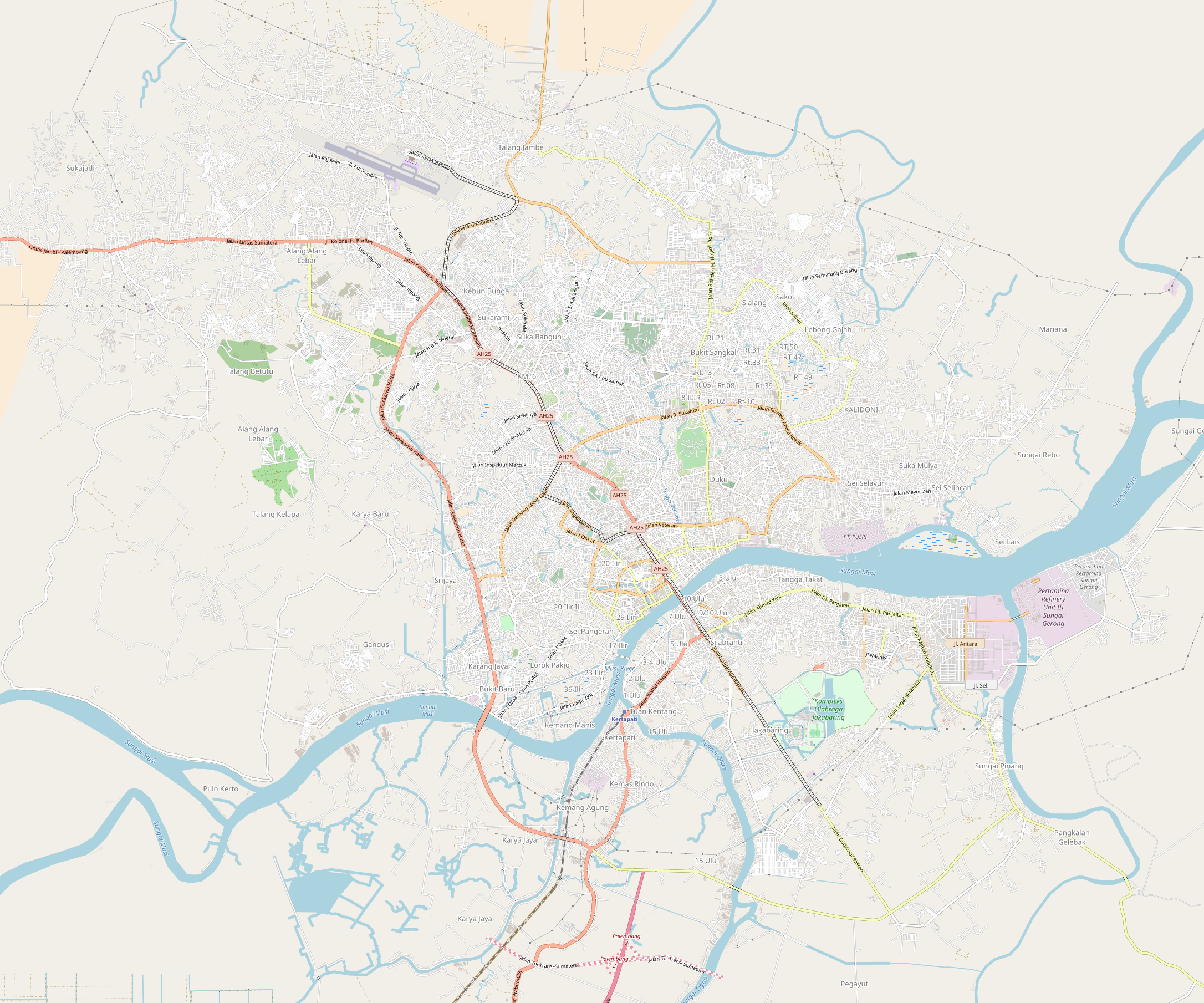
- Location within Palembang

Demang Station is a station of the Palembang LRT Line 1. The station is located between Garuda Dempo station and Bumi Sriwijaya station.

The station was opened on 6 October 2018.

== Station layout ==
2F; Platforms	Side platform, doors will open on the right
2F; Platforms	Platform 1	LRT Line 1 towards DJKA →
2F; Platforms	Platform 2	← LRT Line 1 towards SMB II
2F; Platforms	Side platform, doors will open on the right
1F	Concourse	Faregates, Ticket Booths, Station Control, Shops, Musalla
G	Street Level	Parking (plan)
