= Dishub LRT station =

LRT station in Indonesia

P08 Dishub
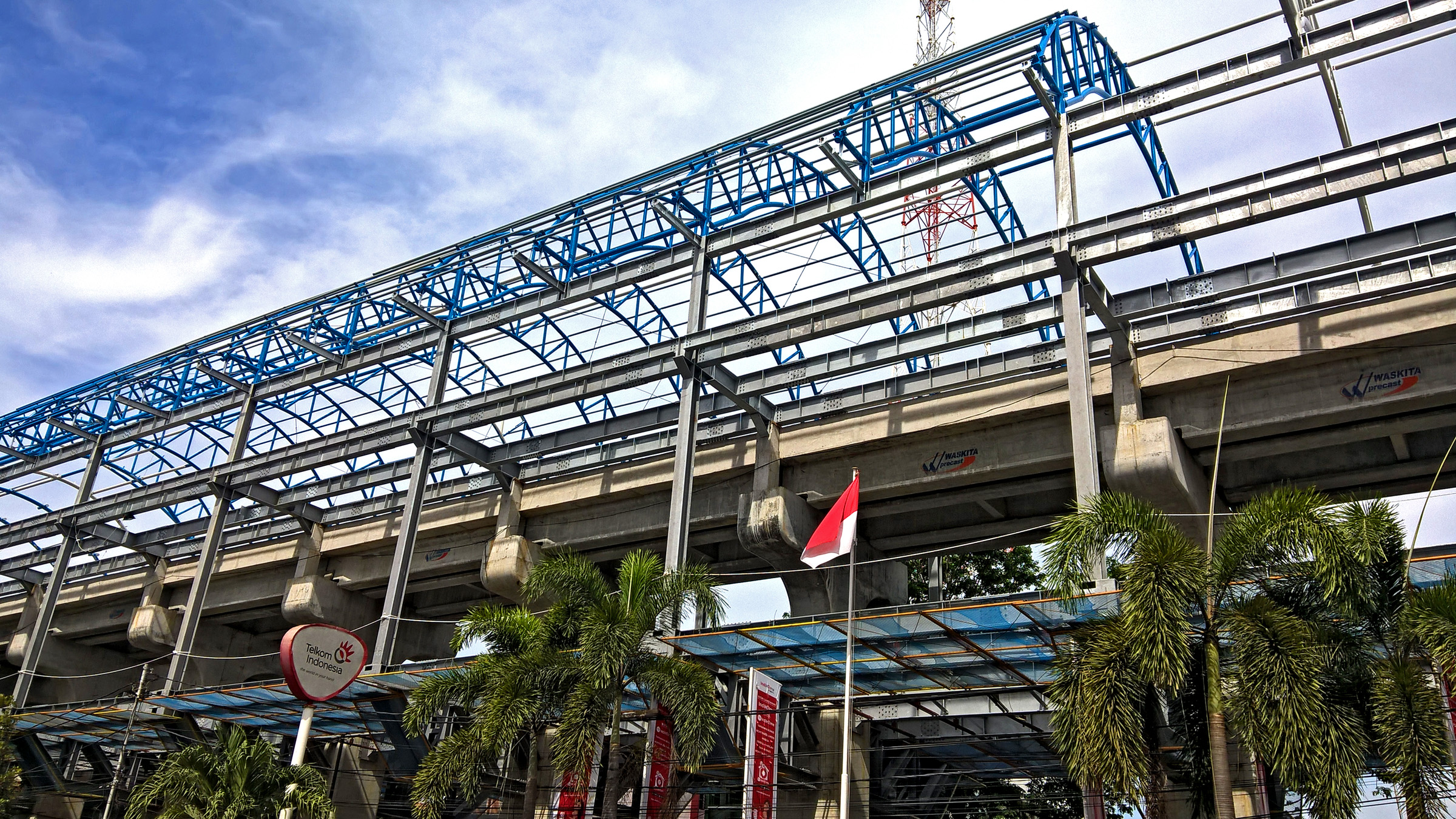
- The station under construction, photo was taken on 19 June 2017

General information
- Location: Jl. Kapten A. Rivai, Sungai Pangeran, Ilir Timur I, Palembang; South Sumatra; Indonesia
- Coordinates: 2.978489°S 104.748939°E
- System: Palembang LRT station
- Owner: Indonesian Railway Company
- Operator: Indonesian Railway Company
- Line: Line 1
- Platforms: 2 side platforms
- Tracks: 2

Construction
- Structure type: Elevated
- Parking: none
- Cycle facilities: none
- Accessible: Available

Other information
- Station code: DIS

History
- Opened: 20 September 2018

Services
Preceding station	Palembang LRT	Following station
Bumi Sriwijaya towards SMB II	Line 1	Cinde towards DJKA
Location
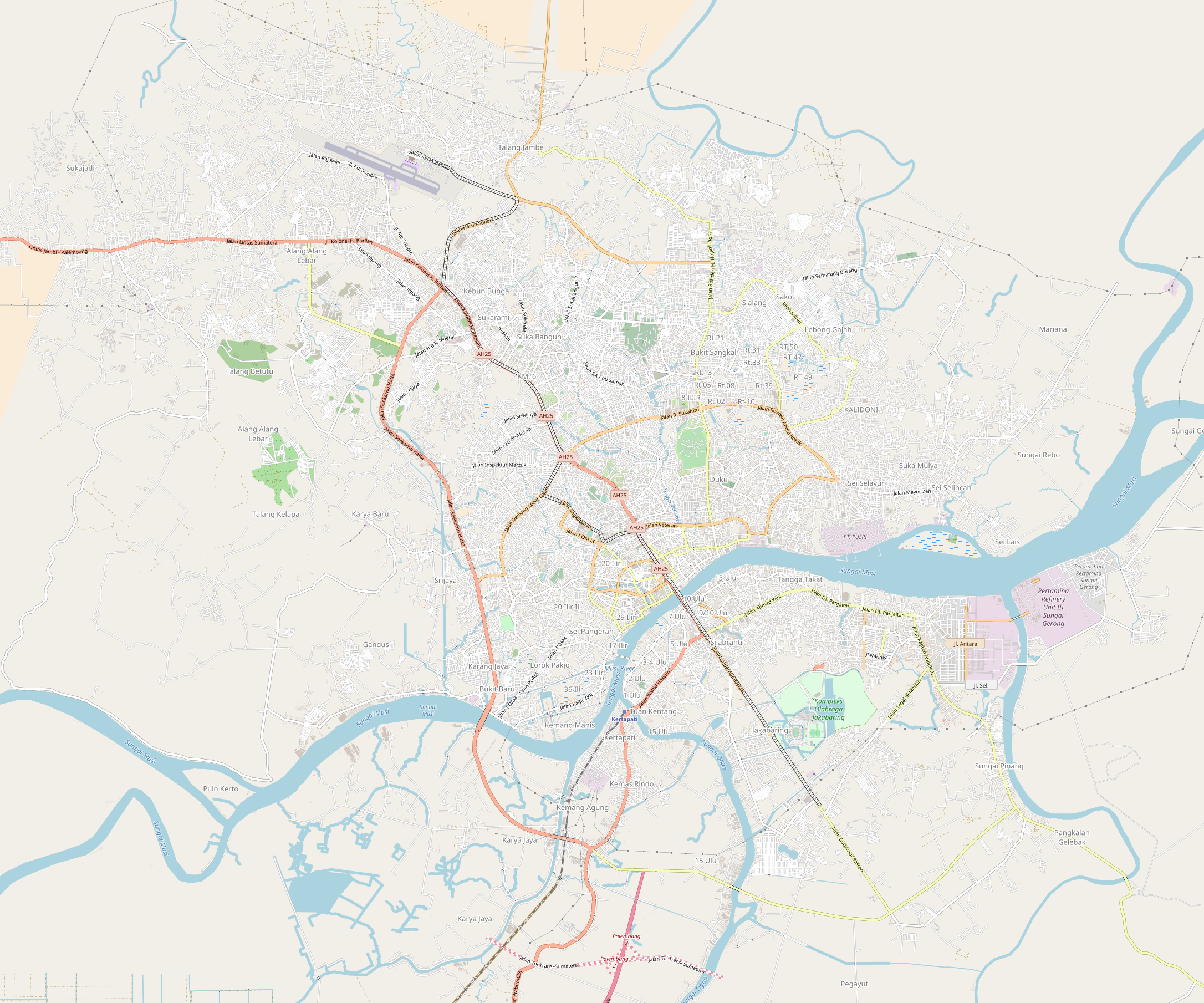
- Location within Palembang

Dishub Station is a station of the Palembang LRT Line 1, in South Sumatra, Indonesia. The station is located between Bumi Sriwijaya station and Cinde station. Located near the station is South Sumatra province's Office of Transportation (Dinas Perhubungan Provinsi Sumatera Selatan, abbreviated as Dishub), hence its name.

The station was opened on 20 September 2018, after the 2018 Asian Games had concluded.

== Station layout ==
2F; Platforms	Side platform, doors will open on the right
2F; Platforms	Platform 1	LRT Line 1 towards DJKA →
2F; Platforms	Platform 2	← LRT Line 1 towards SMB II
2F; Platforms	Side platform, doors will open on the right
1F	Concourse	Faregates, Ticket Booths, Station Control, Shops, Musalla
G	Street Level	Parking (plan)
