= Garuda Dempo LRT station =

Railway station in Palembang, Indonesia

P04 Garuda Dempo

General information
- Location: Jl. Kolonel H. Burlian, Ario Kemuning, Kemuning, Palembang; South Sumatra; Indonesia
- Coordinates: 2.956239°S 104.735833°E
- System: Palembang LRT station
- Owner: Indonesian Railway Company
- Operator: Indonesian Railway Company
- Line: Line 1
- Platforms: 2 side platforms
- Tracks: 2

Construction
- Structure type: Elevated
- Parking: none
- Cycle facilities: none
- Accessible: Available

Other information
- Station code: GAD

History
- Opened: 19 October 2018
- Former names: Polda Station

Services
Preceding station	Palembang LRT	Following station
RSUD towards SMB II	Line 1	Demang towards DJKA
Location
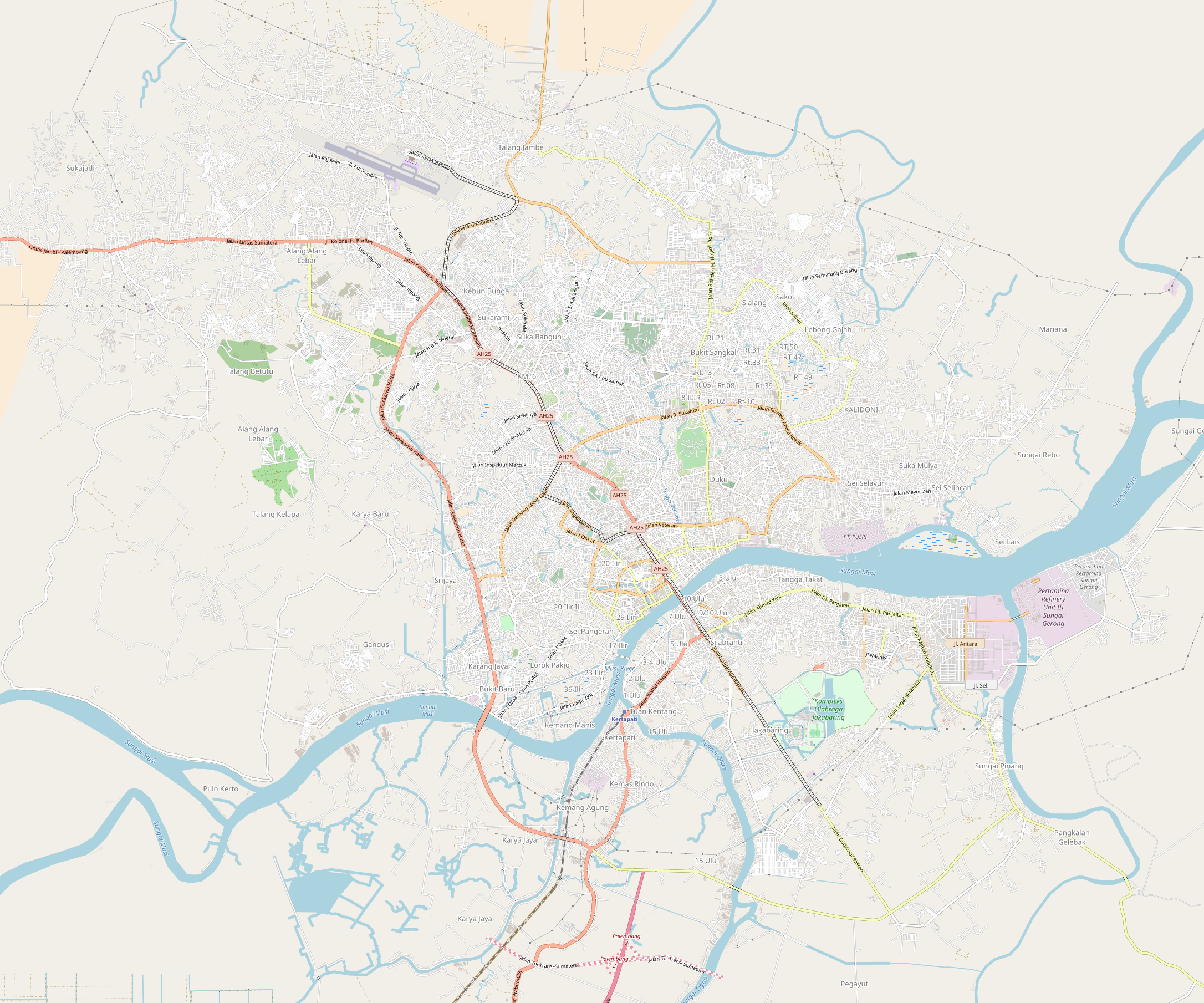
- Location within Palembang

Garuda Dempo Station (formerly Polda Station) is a station of the Palembang Light Rail Transit Line 1 in South Sumatra, Indonesia. The station is located between RSUD station and Demang station.

Garuda Dempo was the last station on Line 1 to be opened to the public after the supporting infrastructure was completed.

== Station layout ==
2F; Platforms	Side platform, doors will open on the right
2F; Platforms	Platform 1	LRT Line 1 towards DJKA →
2F; Platforms	Platform 2	← LRT Line 1 towards SMB II
2F; Platforms	Side platform, doors will open on the right
1F	Concourse	Faregates, Ticket Booths, Station Control, Shops, Musalla
G	Street Level	Parking (plan)
