= RSUD LRT station =

Railway station in Palembang, Indonesia

P04 RSUD
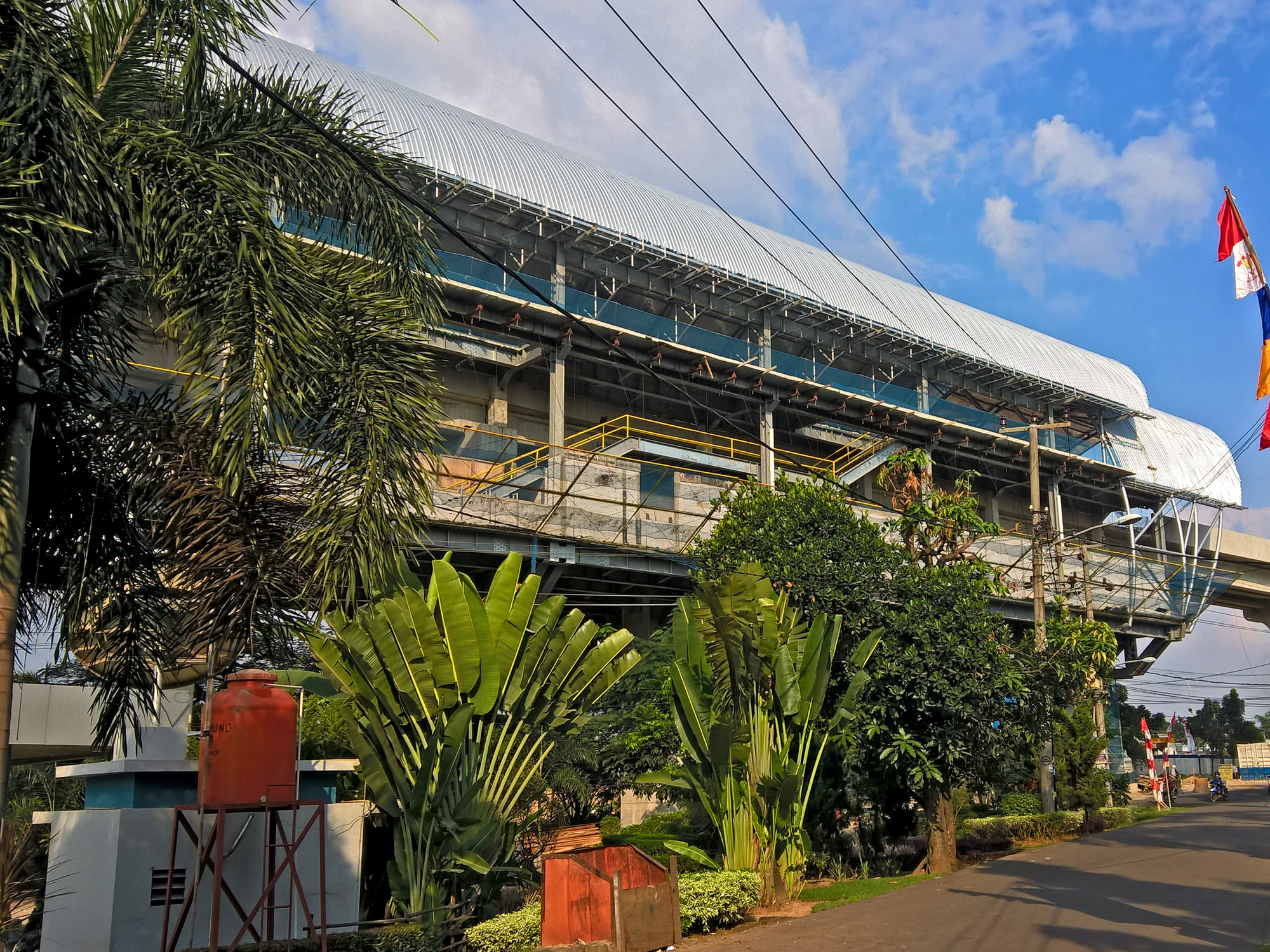
- RSUD station under construction, photo was taken on 22 August 2017

General information
- Location: Jl. Kolonel H. Burlian, Sukabangun, Sukarame, Palembang; South Sumatra; Indonesia
- Coordinates: 2.947647°S 104.732508°E
- System: Palembang LRT station
- Owner: Indonesian Railway Company
- Operator: Indonesian Railway Company
- Line: Line 1
- Platforms: 2 side platforms
- Tracks: 2

Construction
- Structure type: Elevated
- Parking: none
- Cycle facilities: none
- Accessible: Available

Other information
- Station code: RSU

History
- Opened: 25 September 2018

Services
Preceding station	Palembang LRT	Following station
Punti Kayu towards SMB II	Line 1	Garuda Dempo towards DJKA
Location
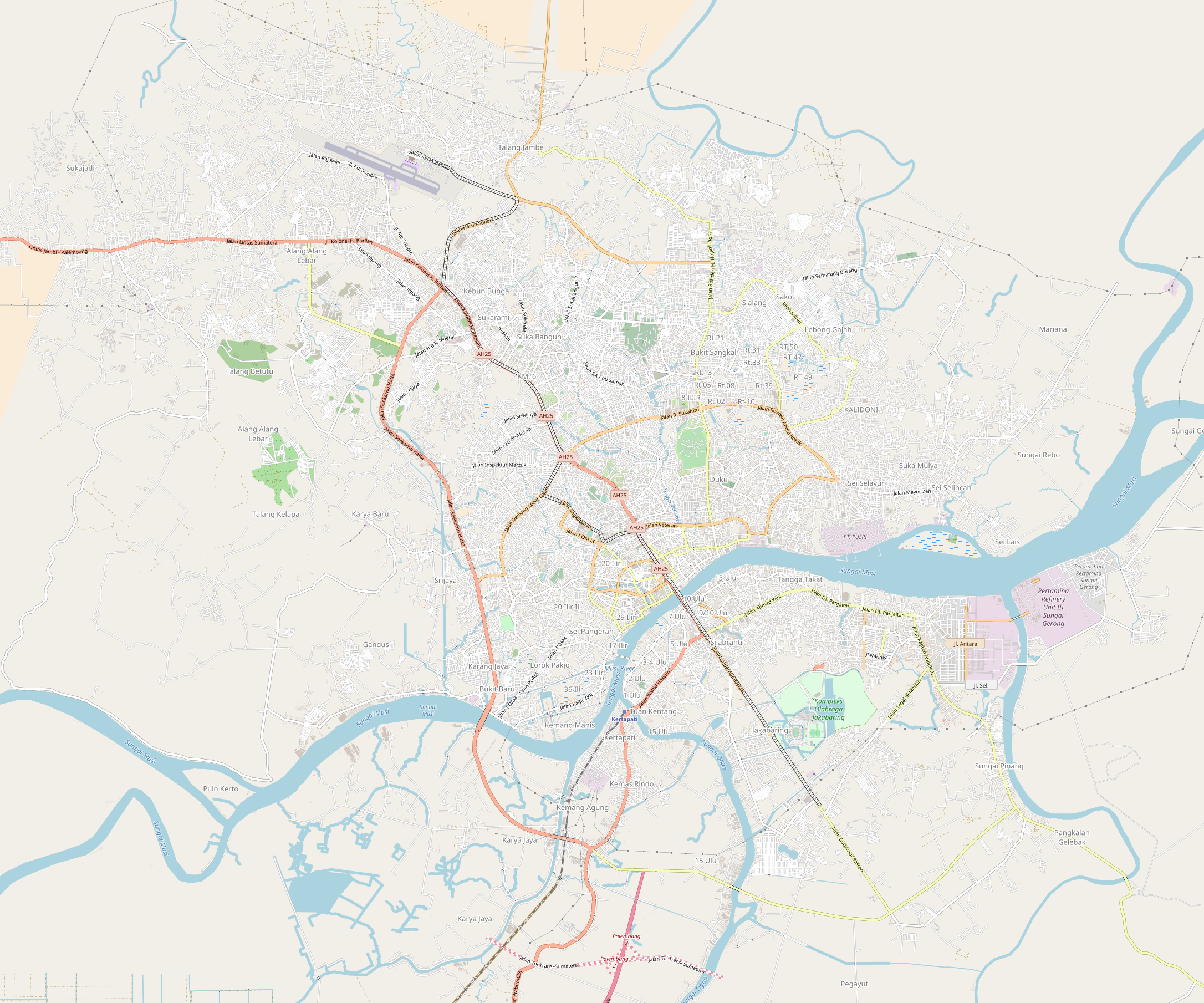
- Location within Palembang

RSUD Station is a station of the Palembang LRT Line 1. The station is located between Punti Kayu and Garuda Dempo station. Near the station is Siti Fatimah Regional General Hospital of Indonesia's South Sumatra Province (RSUD Siti Fatimah Provinsi Sumatera Selatan), hence its name.

The station was opened on 25 September 2018, a day after the opening of Punti Kayu station.

== Station layout ==
2F; Platforms	Side platform, doors will open on the right
2F; Platforms	Platform 1	LRT Line 1 towards DJKA →
2F; Platforms	Platform 2	← LRT Line 1 towards SMB II
2F; Platforms	Side platform, doors will open on the right
1F	Concourse	Faregates, Ticket Booths, Station Control, Shops, Musalla
G	Street Level	Parking (plan)
