= Asrama Haji LRT station =

Light rail station in Palembang, Indonesia

P02 Asrama Haji
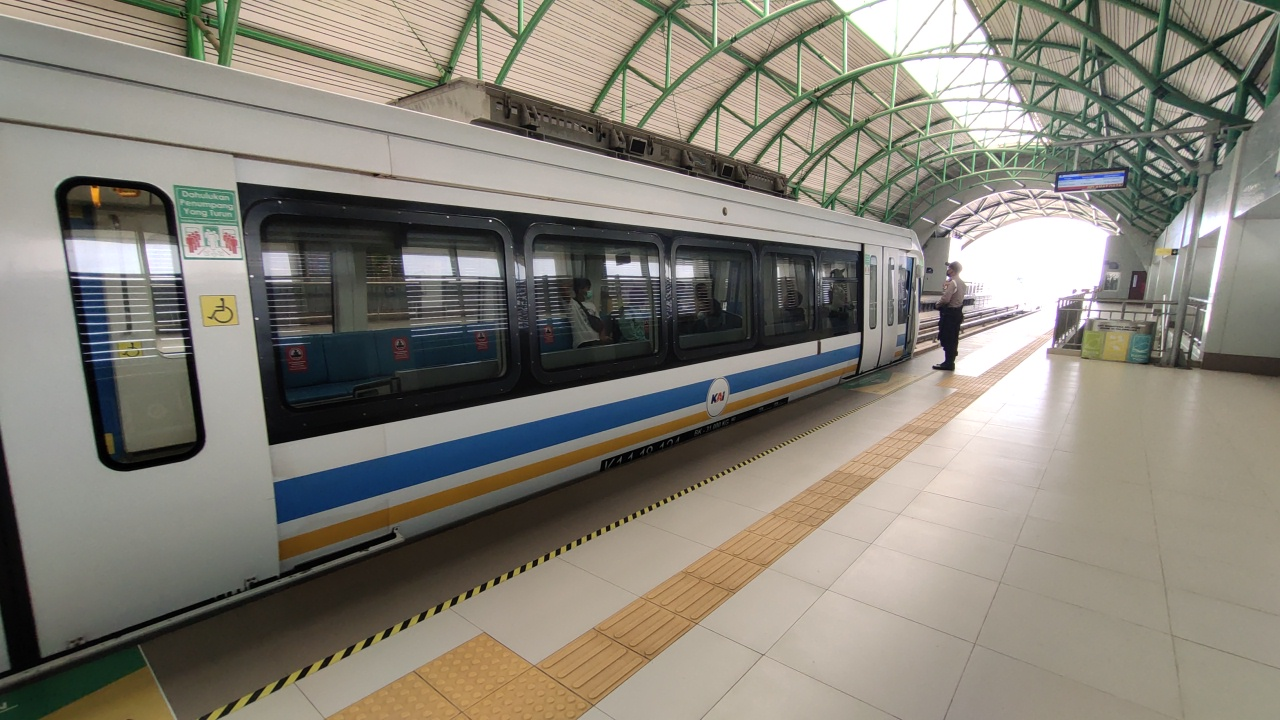
- LRT Palembang departs Asrama Haji station, June 2021

General information
- Location: Jl. Letjen Harun Sohar, Kebun Bunga, Sukarame, Palembang; South Sumatra; Indonesia
- Coordinates: 2°55′10.4″S 104°42′42.6″E
- System: Palembang LRT station
- Owner: Indonesian Railway Company
- Operator: Indonesian Railway Company
- Line: Line 1
- Platforms: 2 side platforms
- Tracks: 2

Construction
- Structure type: Elevated
- Parking: none
- Cycle facilities: none
- Accessible: Available

Other information
- Station code: ASH

History
- Opened: 7 September 2018

Services
Preceding station	Palembang LRT	Following station
SMB II; Terminus	Line 1	Punti Kayu towards DJKA
Location
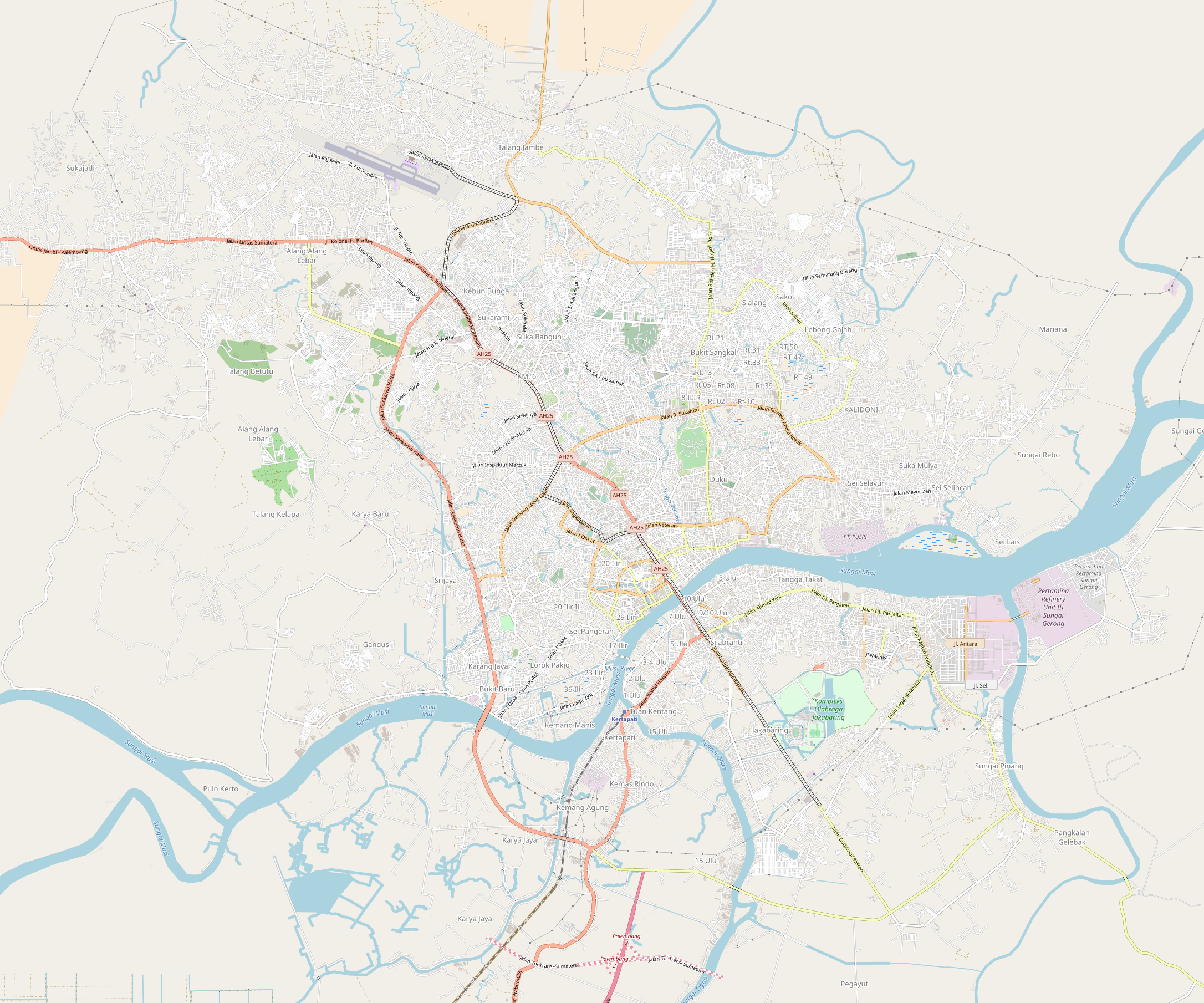
- Location within Palembang

Asrama Haji Station is a station of the Palembang LRT Line 1. The station began operations on 7 September 2018, after the 2018 Asian Games had concluded.

Nearby the station is Palembang Hajj Dormitory (Asrama Haji Palembang), hence its name.

== Station layout ==
2F; Platforms	Side platform, doors will open on the right
2F; Platforms	Platform 1	LRT Line 1 towards DJKA →
2F; Platforms	Platform 2	← LRT Line 1 towards SMB II
2F; Platforms	Side platform, doors will open on the right
1F	Concourse	Faregates, Ticket Booths, Station Control, Shops, Musalla
G	Street Level	Parking (plan)
