= Palembang LRT =

Light rapid transit system in Palembang, Indonesia

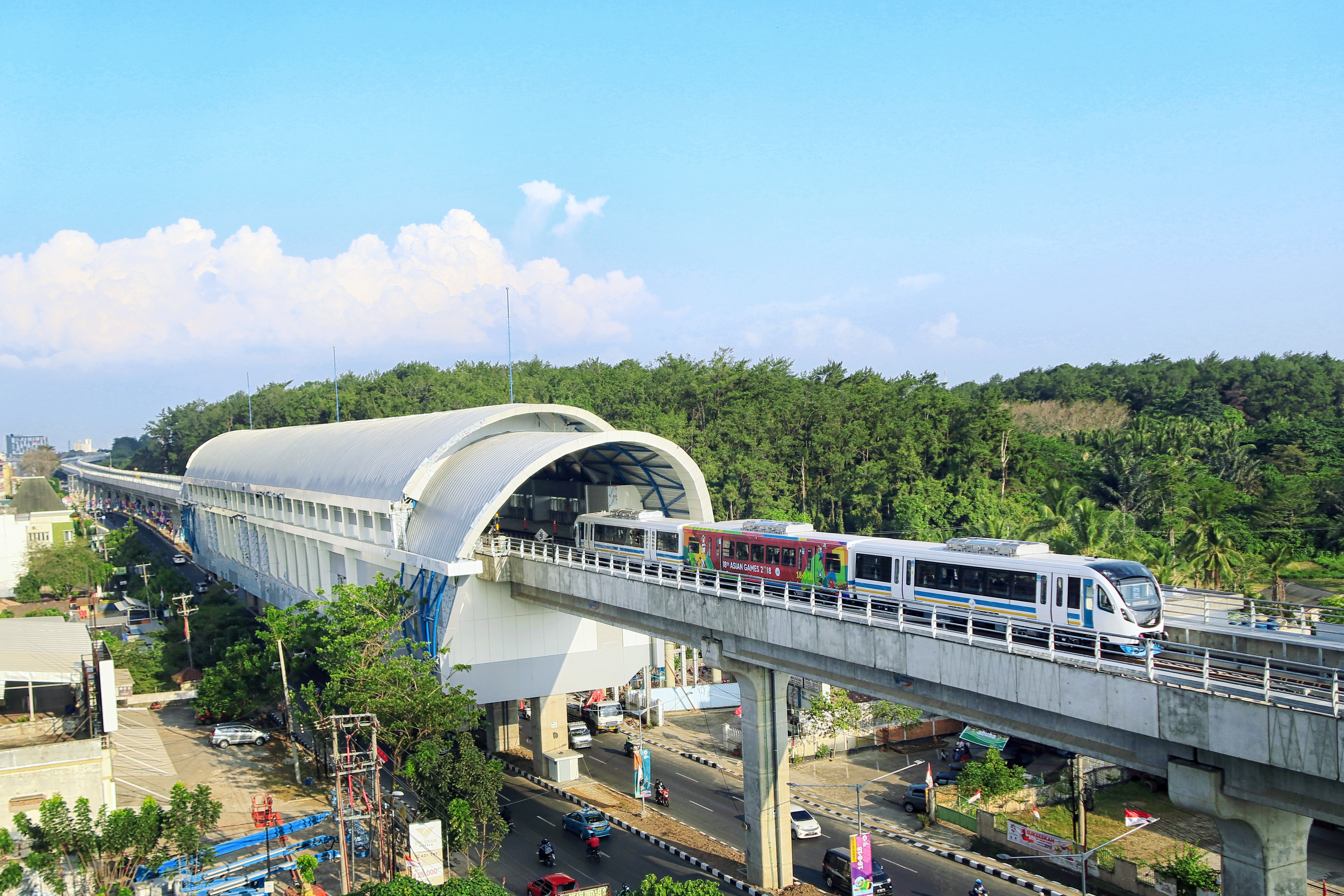
- LRT Palembang train near Punti Kayu Station

Overview
- Owner: Directorate General of Railways (DJKA) of the Ministry of Transportation
- Locale: Palembang, Indonesia
- Transit type: Light rapid transit
- Number of lines: 1
- Number of stations: 13
- Daily ridership: 12,675 (Average, 2025)
- Annual ridership: 4.63 million (2025)

Operation
- Began operation: 1 August 2018; 8 years ago
- Operator: Kereta Api Indonesia
- Character: Elevated
- Number of vehicles: 8
- Train length: 3 carriages
- Headway: 17 minutes

Technical
- System length: 23.4 km (14.5 mi)
- Track gauge: 1,067 mm (3 ft 6 in)
- Electrification: 750 V DC third rail
- Average speed: 40 km/h (25 mph)
- Top speed: 80 km/h (50 mph)

The South Sumatra Light Rapid Transit (Indonesian: Lintas Rel Terpadu Sumatera Selatan, lit. "South Sumatra Integrated Rail Line", shortened to LRT Sumatera Selatan or LRT Sumsel), colloquially known as LRT Palembang or Palembang LRT, is an operational light rapid transit system in Palembang, South Sumatra, Indonesia which connects Sultan Mahmud Badaruddin II International Airport and Jakabaring Sport City. It is the first practical modern light rapid system to operate in Indonesia. (Note: The first light rail system in Indonesia is SHS-23 Aeromovel Indonesia in Jakarta, inaugurated in 1989. However, it is operating inside Taman Mini Indonesia Indah theme park, so it is not a practical urban light rail system.) It was also the first rail line as a rapid transit system in the country.

The system is owned by Directorate General of Railways, Ministry of Transportation of the Republic of Indonesia, Government of South Sumatra, and Government of Palembang; PT Kereta Api Indonesia was appointed to operate the system.

Starting construction in 2015, the project was built to facilitate the 2018 Asian Games and was completed in mid-2018, just a few months before the event. Costing Rp 10.9 trillion for construction, the system utilizes trains made by local manufacturer PT INKA. The system's only line has a total of 13 stations, fully grade-separated by viaduct.

== Construction and costs ==
By 2012, the provincial government already had plans for a transit system in the city, signing a MoU with investors to construct a 25-kilometre-long (16 mi) monorail system connecting the city's airport and Jakabaring Sport City. However, the monorail project was replaced by a higher capacity Light rapid transit (LRT) line in 2015 since Governor of South Sumatra Alex Noerdin thought that LRT is more effective in reducing traffic congestion.

Because Palembang was chosen to host the 2018 Asian Games, the project was pushed to be completed before the event was scheduled to begin. Groundbreaking for the project occurred in November 2015, with state-owned company Waskita Karya being appointed as the primary contractor following the issuance of Presidential Regulation 116 of 2015 on Acceleration of Railway Train Operation in South Sumatera Province. The contract, which was signed in February 2017, was initially valued at Rp 12.5 trillion. Construction was scheduled for completion in February 2018, with commercial service beginning in May 2018. However, the completion date was moved to June 2018 with operations beginning in July, only one month before the Asian Games.

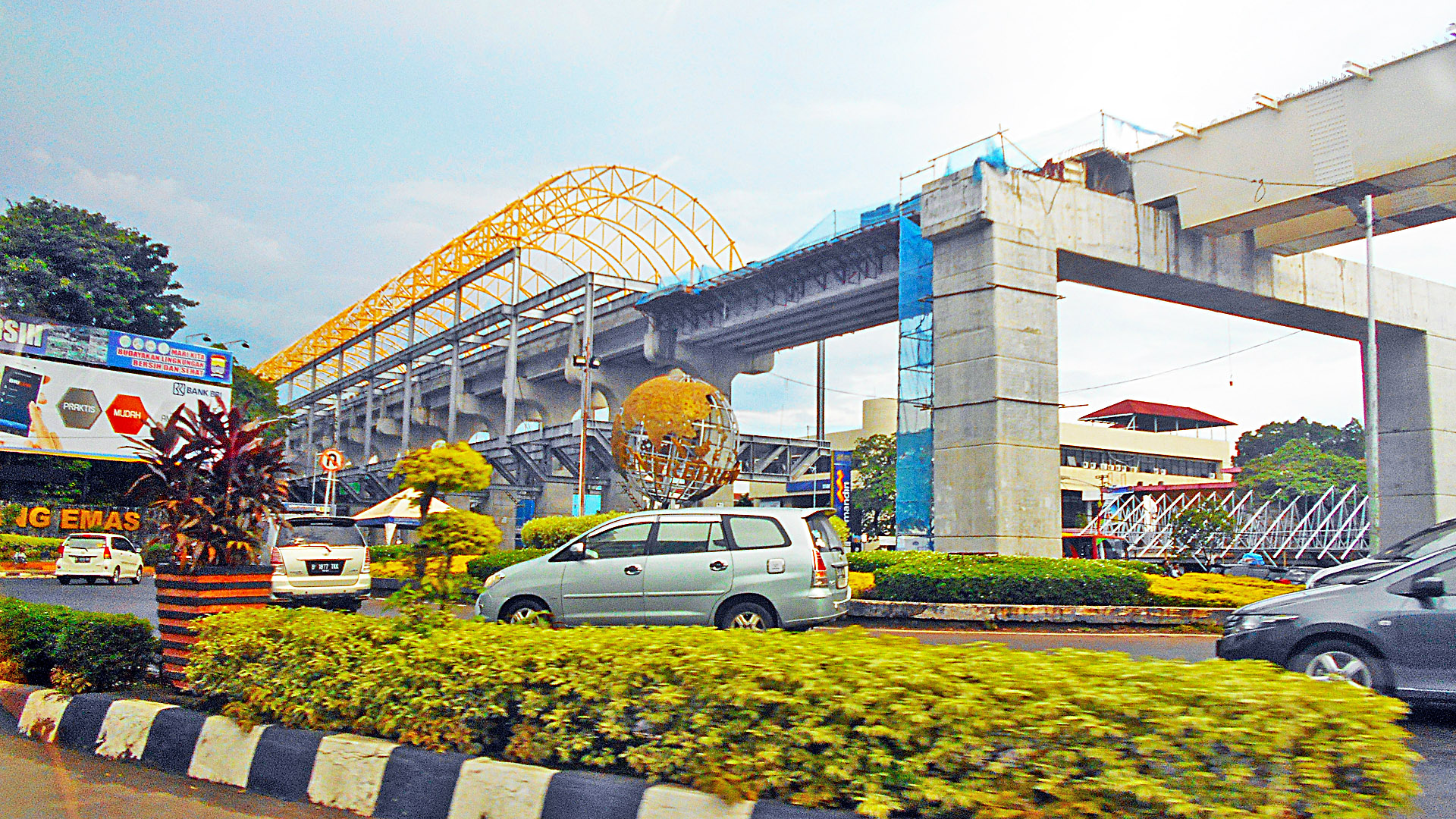
Palembang Light Rapid Transit under construction

A test run was done on 22 May 2018. It was later inaugurated by President Joko Widodo on 15 July 2018. Operations for the LRT started on 1 August, several days before the Jakarta LRT began running, making it the first operational LRT system in the country. The final value of the contract was Rp 10.9 trillion (US$755 million). The reduction in cost was due to a review by supervising consultants from SMEC International. Close to the start of the event, the trains often encountered operational issues. Waskita initially paid for the construction, with the government reimbursing the fees over a four-year period.

Prominent opposition figure and Gerindra leader Prabowo Subianto criticized the cost of construction, claiming that typical LRT lines worldwide cost US$8 million/km to construct while the Palembang LRT cost US$24 million/km. As a comparison, the cancelled Sheppard East LRT in Toronto would have cost US$56.7 million/km. The Palembang LRT project leader compared the higher cost to those of other projects in neighboring countries: the Kelana Jaya line (US$65.52 million/km) and the Manila Light Rail Transit Line 1 extension (US$74.6 million/km).

== Infrastructure ==
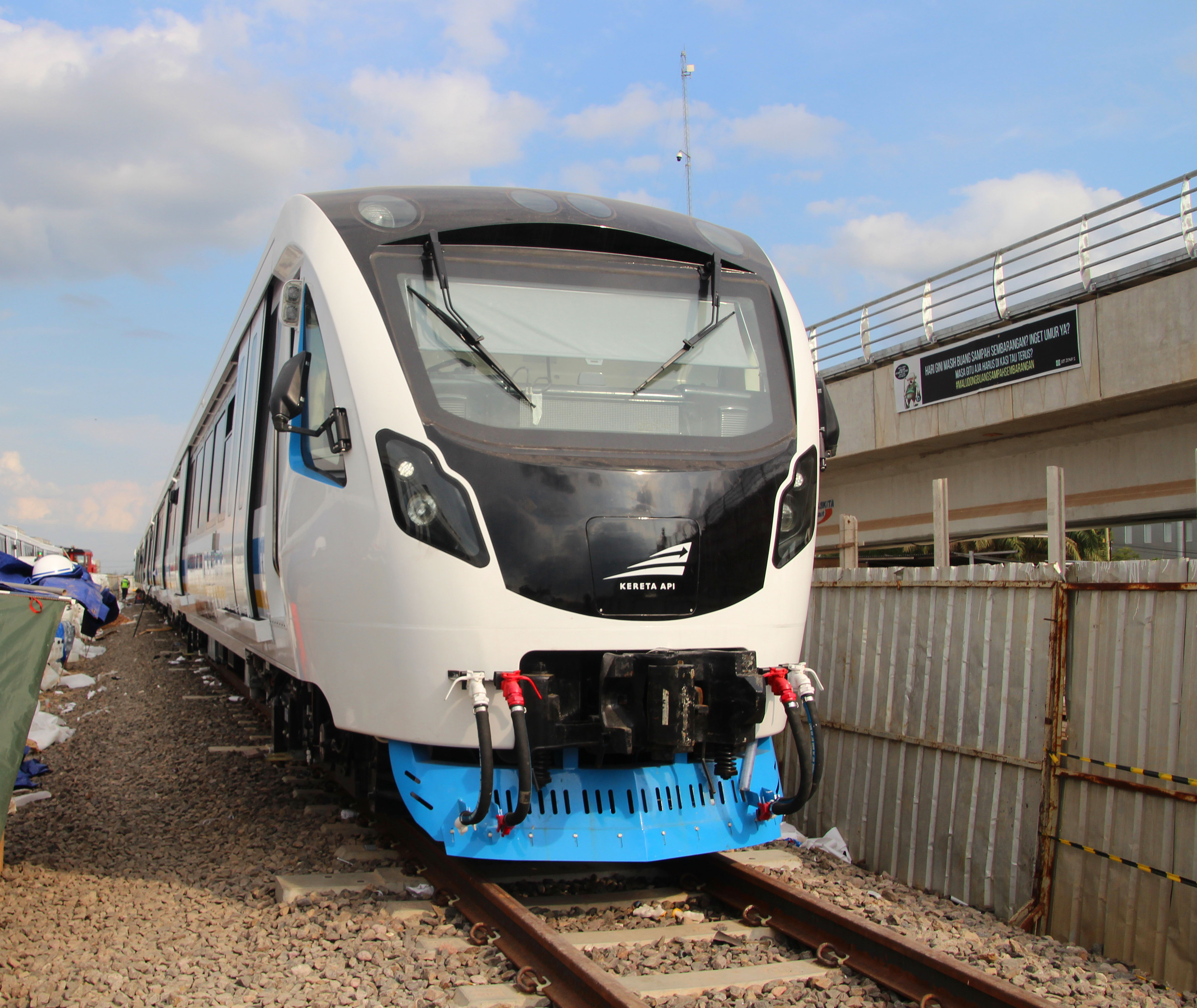
LRT Palembang rolling stock train made by PT Inka, parked at LRT Depo.

=== Rolling stock ===
As of August 2018, the service operates eight sets of trains delivered in April 2018, each with 3 carriages for a total of 24 carriages. Weighing 88 tons per carriage, a full train has a total capacity of 722 passengers, 231 in the first and third carriages, with the remaining 260 in the center carriage. Of this, the seating capacity is 78.

The electrical trains operate on 750 V DC voltage. Individual carriages, made from stainless steel, have a roof height of 3.7 m (12 ft 2 in) and a floor height of 1,025 mm (40.4 in). The gap between bogies is 11.5 m (37 ft 9 in), with the total length of the current trains (3 carriages) at 51,800 millimetres (169 ft 11 in). The trains are assembled by PT INKA, with around half of the components manufactured locally.

=== Stations ===
The only line of the system serves 13 stations, all elevated. Six stations were initially opened to public in August 2018, with the rest gradually opening in the following months.

| Station name | Opening |
|---|---|
| Bandara SMB II | 1 August 2018 |
| Asrama Haji | 7 September 2018 |
| Puntikayu | 24 September 2018 |
| RSUD | 25 September 2018 |
| Garuda Dempo | 19 October 2018 |
| Demang | 6 October 2018 |
| Bumi Sriwijaya | 1 August 2018 |
| Dishub | 20 September 2018 |
| Cinde | 1 August 2018 |
| Ampera | 1 August 2018 |
| Polresta | 27 September 2018 |
| Jakabaring | 1 August 2018 |
| DJKA | 1 August 2018 |

=== Track ===
The train uses a 1,067 mm (3 ft 6.0 in) ballastless, elevated track. The signalling for the track uses fixed-block signalling. Stretching 23.4 kilometres (14.5 mi) between the airport in the northwest and train depot in the southeast, the track is supported by 9 electrical substations and a third rail. After passing Ampera station, the train crosses the Musi River next to the Ampera Bridge.

== Operation ==
The train runs from 05:05 am to 08:43 pm, with 94 trips per day and a headway of 17 minutes. A full trip of the only line takes up to 49 minutes. In each station, the trains have a transit time of approximately 1 minute, except for the two terminuses at the depot and airport, where they stop for 10 minutes.

=== Fares ===
The fare separates passengers riding to and from the airport and those who do not, with the former paying a higher fare of Rp10,000 while the latter paying Rp5,000. Students can apply for unlimited-ride transit passes with the low price of Rp25,000/month. The fares are subsidized by the central government, which spent Rp120–180 billion annually to cover the operating cost of the system.

=== Ridership ===
The government targets a daily ridership of 96,000 with an increased figure of 110,000 by 2030. Between July 2018 and February 2019, around 1 million passengers travelled on the LRT. In November 2019, the operating company reported around 6,000 daily riders on weekdays and 10,000 on weekends, and that by October 2019 3 million trips had been completed. Daily ridership declined sharply in 2020 and 2021 due to the COVID-19 pandemic. However, by the first half of 2022, daily ridership had risen to exceed the pre-pandemic number.

Throughout the first half of 2025, the service had 2.2 million passengers.
