= Sultan Mahmud Badaruddin II International Airport =

Airport serving Palembang, South Sumatra, Indonesia

Sultan Mahmud Badaruddin II International Airport Bandar Udara Internasional Sultan Mahmud Badaruddin II
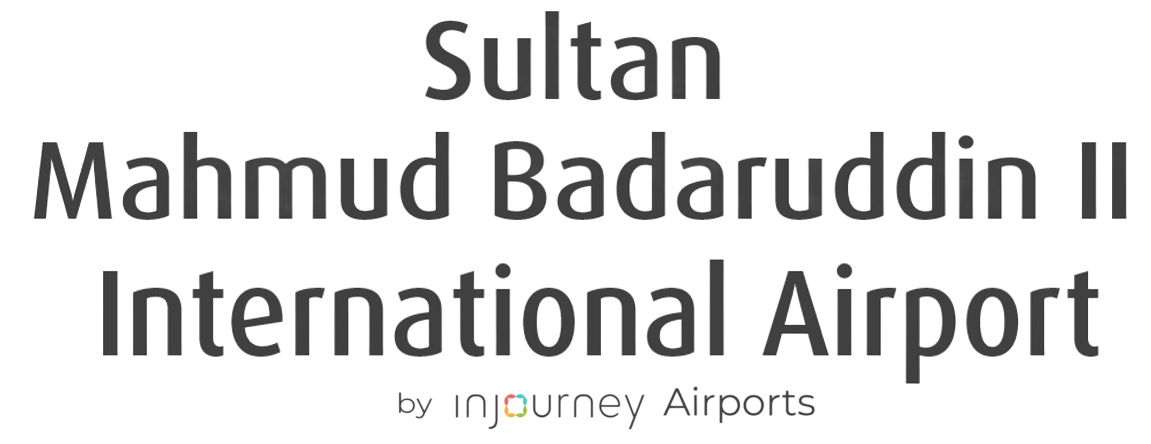

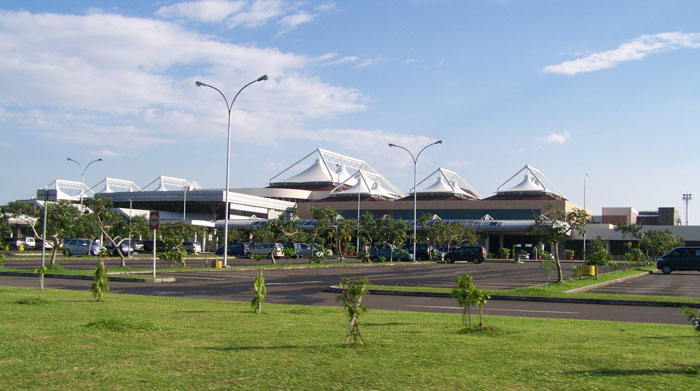
- IATA: PLM; ICAO: WIPP; WMO: 96221

Summary
- Airport type: Public / Military
- Owner: Government of Indonesia
- Operator: InJourney Airports
- Serves: Palembang
- Location: Talang Betutu, Palembang, South Sumatra, Indonesia
- Operating base for: Lion Air
- Time zone: WIB (UTC+07:00)
- Elevation AMSL: 121 ft (37 m)
- Coordinates: 02°54′01″S 104°42′00″E
- Website: www.smbadaruddin2-airport.co.id

Maps
- Sumatra region in Indonesia

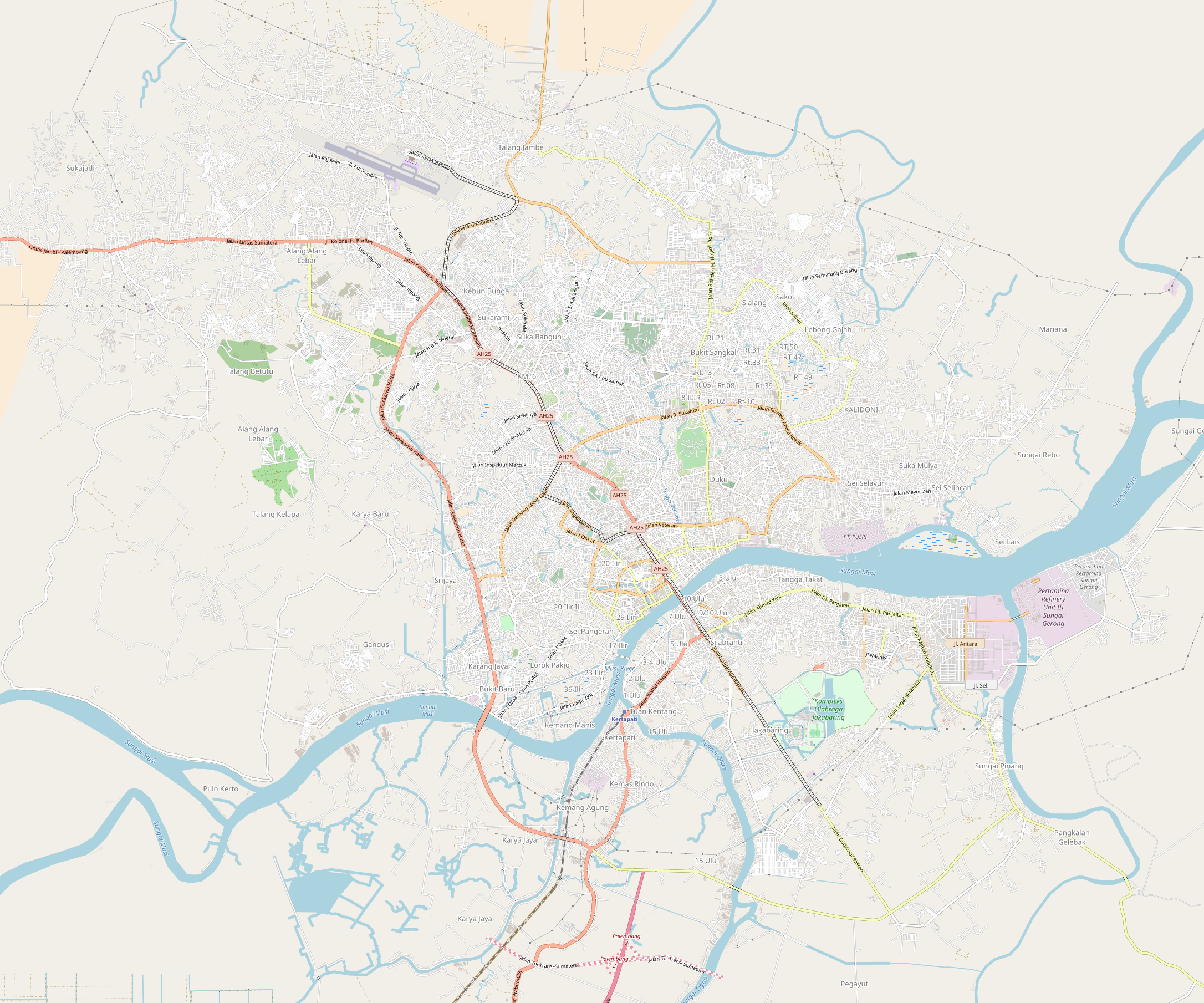
- Location in Palembang Location in Sumatra Location in Indonesia

Runways
Direction	Length		Surface
Direction	ft	m	Surface
11/29	9,843	3,000	Asphalt

Statistics (2024)
- Passengers: 2,858,042 (▲3.4%)
- Cargo (tonnes): 7,234 (▲42.0%)
- Aircraft movements: 19,094 (▼1.9%)
- Source: DGCA

Sultan Mahmud Badaruddin II International Airport (IATA: PLM, ICAO: WIPP) is an international airport serving the city of Palembang, the capital and largest city of South Sumatra, Indonesia, as well as its surrounding areas. The airport is located in the Talang Betutu district, approximately 10 km from the city center. Formerly known as Talang Betutu Airport, it was later renamed in honor of Sultan Mahmud Badaruddin II (1767–1852), the last sultan of Palembang and a revered Indonesian national hero. The airport is the primary gateway to Palembang and South Sumatra, offering flights to key cities across Indonesia, including Jakarta, Surabaya, Medan, and Yogyakarta. The airport also offers international flights to Kuala Lumpur, Malaysia, and Singapore. These services were suspended during the COVID-19 pandemic in 2020, and in 2024 the airport’s international status was temporarily revoked due to the absence of international operations. The status was reinstated the following year.

In addition of handling commercial/general aviation flights, the airport also hosts the Sri Mulyono Herlambang Air Force Base, a Type B class facility of the Indonesian Air Force. The airbase is situated directly across the runway from the passenger terminal. This airbase would usually host the annual Super Garuda Shield military exercise that is conducted yearly between Indonesia and the United States.

== History ==
=== Colonial era ===
Long before Indonesia's independence, in 1920, the land that now houses Sultan Mahmud Badaruddin II Airport was an empty plot, once part of a native plantation. At that time, the Dutch East Indies government acquired the land through the Palembang Maatschappij. Around the same period, a Dutch pilot was reported to be flying to Indonesia and intended to land in Palembang. The former plantation land was then transformed into the city's first airfield, known as Talang Betutu Airfield. The Dutch pilot, Jan Pieterszoon, subsequently landed a small Fokker plane from Europe in Palembang.

The airport played a crucial role in the war efforts during World War II. In January 1942, the American-British-Dutch-Australian Command (ABDACOM) decided to consolidate Allied air forces in Sumatra, establishing two key airfields near Palembang: Pangkalan Benteng, also known as 'P1' (the current airport), and a secret airbase at Prabumulih (then Praboemoelih), referred to as 'P2'. The airport was a significant strategic asset for both the Allies and the Japanese, who considered it a primary target alongside the Royal Dutch Shell oil refineries at Pladju (Pladjoe), located just miles from Palembang. The Japanese viewed the airport as essential for reinforcing and resupplying their forces, and as a base for further advancing into northern Sumatra and Java.

In February 1942, during the Battle of Palembang, Japanese forces captured the airfield as part of their broader invasion of the Dutch East Indies. The Royal Netherlands East Indies Army (KNIL) defenders in Palembang were relatively weak. Commanded by Lieutenant Colonel N.W. Vogelsang, they numbered only around 2,000 personnel, including a single battalion stationed at Talang Betutu Airfield. Their primary objective was to secure the two strategically vital oil refineries at Pladju and Sungai Gerong, owned respectively by BPM and Stanvac. However, only about 300 KNIL troops were actually deployed within Palembang itself. Japanese fighter aircraft repeatedly bombed Talang Betutu airfield, while coordinated assaults were launched by land and naval forces. Paratroopers under Colonel Seiichi Kume were deployed to seize key targets, including Talang Betutu airfield and the oil refineries. Approximately 180 paratroopers were assigned to capture the airfield, with a further 90 tasked with securing the refineries at Plaju and Sungai Gerong. Meanwhile, the KNIL Manado Battalion, originally stationed in Prabumulih, was redeployed to reinforce the defense of the oil installations. Despite these efforts, the Japanese assault—executed rapidly and in coordination across air, land, and sea—overwhelmed the outnumbered and dispersed KNIL forces, leaving them unable to mount effective resistance.

Following the takeover of the airfield, the Imperial Japanese Army undertook reconstruction works between 1942 and 1943, including extending the runway. These efforts relied in part on Allied prisoners of war, who were subjected to harsh and inhumane treatment by their captors. Throughout the remainder of the war, the airfield was frequently targeted by Allied aircraft.

After the Japanese surrender in 1945, control of the airfield was handed over to the returning Dutch authorities. It subsequently became a Dutch stronghold during the Indonesian National Revolution and served as a major supply base for Dutch forces in Palembang. In 1947, during clashes between Dutch forces and Indonesian fighters, Indonesian forces sought to capture or neutralize the airfield. Indonesian fighters harassed Dutch forces at the airfield in an effort to disrupt reinforcements and prevent supplies from reaching Palembang.

=== Independence era ===
On 1 January 1950, following Dutch recognition of Indonesia’s sovereignty, Dutch forces withdrew from the airfield. It was subsequently opened by the Indonesian authorities for civilian use as Talang Betutu Airport, serving as a gateway to the region by air. During the PRRI rebellion in the 1950s, the airfield served as a major base for the Indonesian Air Force.

In 1967, the airport was later renamed Sultan Mahmud Badaruddin II International Airport. The name was chosen in honor of the Indonesian hero Sultan Mahmud Badaruddin II, who led the Sultanate of Palembang Darussalam from 1803 to 1819. During his leadership, Badaruddin II played a pivotal role in resisting the Dutch East India Company (VOC), which was invading Palembang at the time. The airport gained international status in 1970.

Effective 1 April 1991, the airport came under the management of Angkasa Pura II, which later rebranded as InJourney Airports. When South Sumatra was selected to host PON XVI in 2004, the government initiated plans to expand the airport’s capacity and upgrade its status to an international airport. The current terminal building was inaugurated on 27 September 2005 by then-President Susilo Bambang Yudhoyono. The airport underwent further expansion in 2017 in preparation for the 2018 Asian Games.

In 2024, the Indonesian Ministry of Transportation briefly revoked the airport's international status due to the absence of international flights; however, it was reinstated in 2025. Following the restoration of its international status, the airport resumed international flights to neighboring countries such as Singapore and Malaysia.

== Facilities and development ==
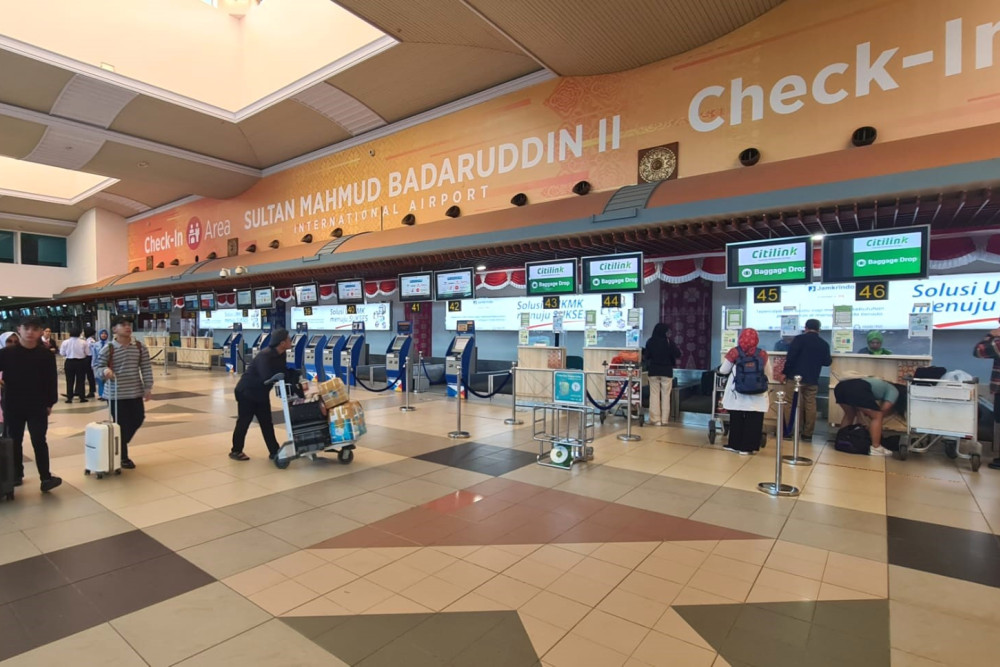
Check-in area

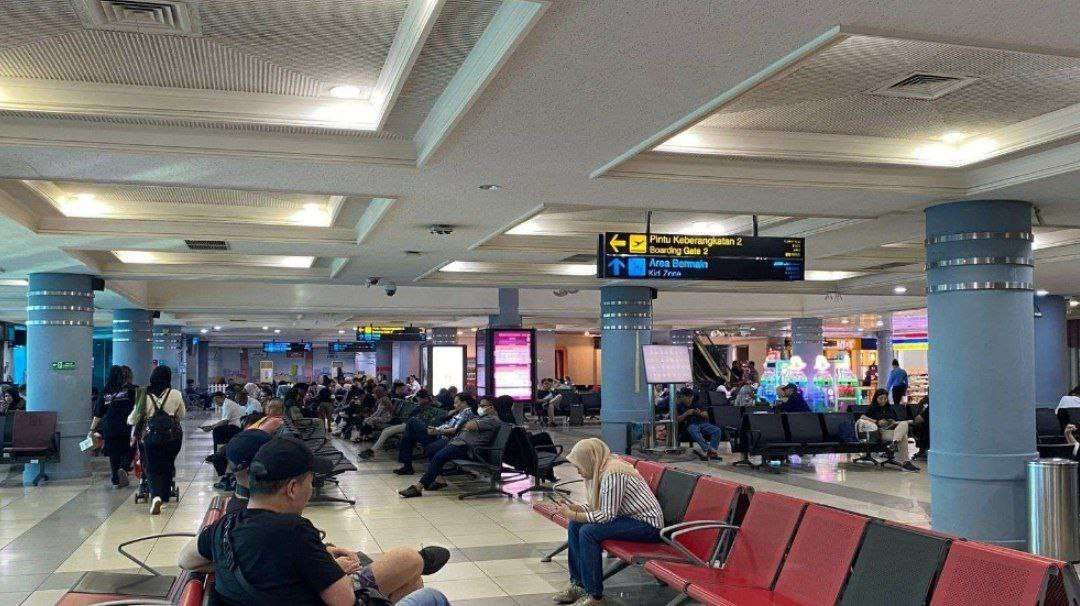
Boarding gate

Following its redevelopment, the airport was upgraded to an international hub capable of accommodating wide-body aircraft, officially commencing such operations on 27 September 2005. The project began on 18 September 2003, with a total cost of 366.7 billion rupiah, financed through a loan from the Japan Bank for International Cooperation (JBIC) amounting to 251.9 billion rupiah, along with 114.8 billion rupiah in matching funds from the state budget. The development included the extension of the runway to 3,000 by 45 meters, as well as the construction of a 20,000-square-meter parking area with a capacity of 1,000 vehicles. A three-storey passenger terminal was also built, covering 13,000 square meters and designed to accommodate up to 1,250 passengers daily. Additional facilities included aerobridges, a cargo terminal, and supporting buildings with a total area of 1,900 square meters. As a result of these upgrades, Sultan Mahmud Badaruddin II International Airport became capable of handling wide-body aircraft such as the Airbus A330, Boeing 747, and Boeing 777, thus enabling the airport to begin accommodating Hajj flights to Saudi Arabia.

In preparation for the 2011 SEA Games, a minor expansion was carried out at the airport. The terminal area was increased from 23,000 to 26,500 square meters, raising its capacity from 1 million passengers per year—already exceeded, as the airport handled about 2.1 million passengers in 2010—to 2 million passengers annually, at a cost of approximately 43 billion rupiah. The development included, among other works, the expansion of the check-in area, domestic and international boarding lounges, the addition of aerobridges, departure corridors, and other supporting facilities. A further expansion was undertaken in 2012, increasing the terminal area to 34,000 square meters and boosting capacity to around 3 million passengers annually, at a cost of approximately 130 billion rupiah.

The airport was further developed in preparation for the 2018 Asian Games, with construction beginning in late 2016 and completed by 2017. The terminal’s passenger capacity increased from 3.4 million to 4.6 million passengers annually, while the number of check-in counters rose to 43. In addition, the airport terminal layout was reconfigured, with the works including the utilization of previously unused space for the installation of self check-in and bag drop facilities, the widening of corridors, the addition of toilets, and the expansion of conveyor areas. The expansion also included an increase in jet bridges from five to eight. The terminal area was enlarged from 34,000 to 46,000 square meters. In total, the expansion cost approximately 130 billion rupiah. Parallel to the airport’s development, the Palembang Light Rail Transit (LRT) system was constructed, providing a direct connection between the airport and downtown Palembang. In addition, a skybridge was built to seamlessly link the terminal with the LRT station.

Further expansion is planned, with the terminal projected to reach up to 115,000 square meters and passenger capacity gradually increased to accommodate up to 9 million passengers annually. The existing apron, which currently accommodates 13 aircraft, will also be expanded to handle up to 19 aircraft.

== Airlines and destinations ==
=== Passenger ===
Airlines	Destinations
AirAsia	Kuala Lumpur–International
Batik Air	Jakarta–Halim Perdanakusuma, Jakarta–Soekarno-Hatta
Citilink	Bandung–Husein Sastranegara, Batam, Jakarta–Soekarno-Hatta, Yogyakarta–International
Garuda Indonesia	Jakarta–Soekarno-Hatta
Lion Air	Batam, Jakarta–Soekarno-Hatta, Surabaya
Pelita Air	Jakarta–Soekarno-Hatta
Saudia	Seasonal: Medina
Scoot	Singapore
Super Air Jet	Jakarta–Soekarno-Hatta, Medan, Pangkal Pinang, Yogyakarta–International
Susi Air	Pagar Alam
Wings Air	Pangkal Pinang

== Statistics ==
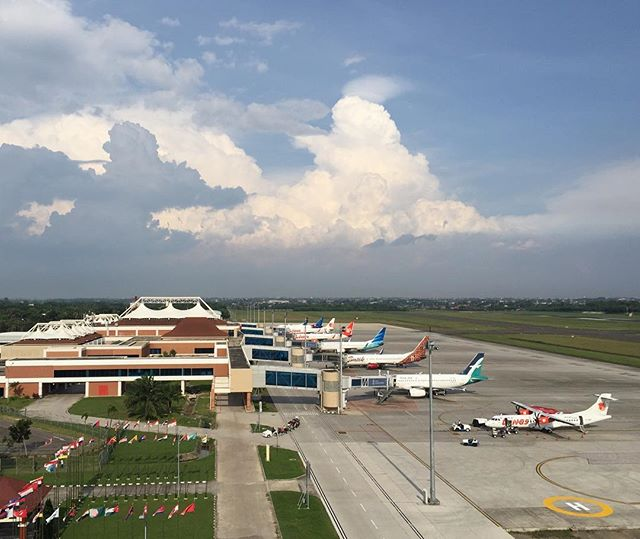
Apron view of the airport

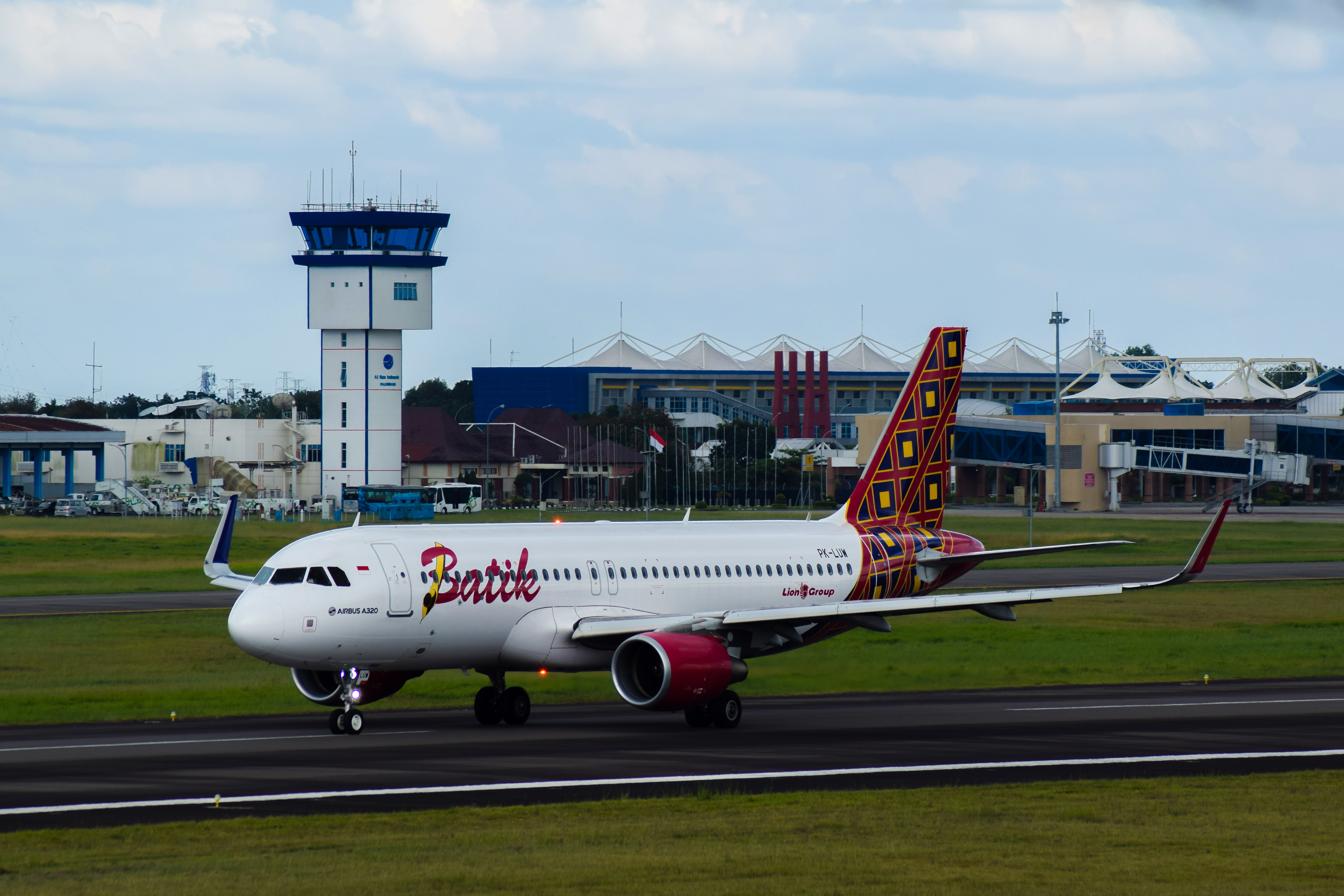
A Batik Air Airbus A320-200 landing in Sultan Mahmud Badaruddin II International Airport

Annual passenger numbers and aircraft statistics
Year	Passengers handled	Passenger % change	Cargo (tonnes)	Cargo % change	Aircraft movements	Aircraft % change
2006	1,476,687	Steady	6,003	Steady	15,457	Steady
2007	1,659,205	▲12.4	7,364	▲22.7	16,899	▲9.3
2008	1,611,206	▼2.9	9,216	▲25.1	8,735	▼48.3
2009	1,810,822	▲12.4	8,121	▼11.9	15,380	▲76.1
2010	2,106,146	▲16.3	9,790	▲20.6	16,484	▲7.2
2011	2,597,433	▲23.3	11,965	▲22.2	19,576	▲18.8
2012	2,902,749	▲11.8	13,584	▲13.5	20,644	▲5.5
2013	3,032,629	▲4.5	14,298	▲5.3	22,288	▲8.0
2014	3,130,688	▲3.2	15,067	▲5.4	23,300	▲4.5
2015	3,384,464	▲8.1	14,408	▼4.4	26,586	▲14.1
2016	3,899,018	▲15.2	15,015	▲4.2	33,852	▲27.3
2017	4,623,696	▲18.6	16,705	▲11.3	41,755	▲23.3
2018	5,167,436	▲11.8	19,745	▲18.2	45,559	▲9.1
2019	4,019,815	▼22.2	14,049	▼28.8	37,254	▼18.2
2020	1,445,328	▼64.0	6,287	▼55.2	17,670	▼52.6
2021	1,033,195	▼38.5	5,687	▼9.5	11,160	▼36.8
2022	2,063,260	▲99.7	5,297	▼6.9	17,373	▲55.7
2023	2,765,010	▲34.0	5,093	▼3.9	19,463	▲12.0
2024	2,858,042	▲3.4	7,234	▲42.0	19,094	▼1.9
^{Source: DGCA, BPS}

== Ground transportation ==
=== Bus ===
DAMRI intercity buses operate from the airport, providing connections to various cities in South Sumatra, including Baturaja, Prabumulih, and Muara Enim.

=== Taxi ===
Various taxi services are available at Sultan Mahmud Badaruddin II International Airport to transport passengers to destinations in Palembang and nearby cities. Official airport taxi operators include Balido Taxi, Blue Bird, Primkopau Taxi, and Starcab Taxi. The initial fare (flag fall) is Rp 7,000, with an additional charge of Rp 5,000 per kilometer. These taxi services operate 24 hours a day. In addition, passengers can also opt for ride-hailing services such as Grab and Gojek. Fares for these online taxis vary depending on the travel distance.

=== Rail ===
Anticipating traffic congestion during the period of 2018 Asian Games, the local government built the Palembang Light Rail Transit, which connects the airport to Jakabaring Sport City. Only some of the stations were opened in time for the games. The remaining stations opened on 18 October 2017. It is the first practical modern light rapid system to operate in Indonesia.

The Sultan Mahmud Badaruddin II International Airport LRT station serves the airport, which is connected to the airport terminal by a skybridfe. The LRT's fare separates passengers who ride to and from the airport and those who do not, with the former paying a higher fare of Rp 10,000 while the latter pay Rp 5,000.

== Accidents and incidents ==
- October 6, 1937 - The KLM Douglas DC-3, named "Specht" with registration PH-ALS from Palembang to Singapore, crashed immediately after takeoff at Palembang Airport, Netherlands East Indies. Three crew members and one passenger died. The co-pilot and seven passengers survived. A connecting rod in the No. 1 engine had failed, causing a fuel-fed fire. The pilot cut the fuel flow to the engine, but the aircraft was unable to gain height on one engine, leading to its crash.
- On September 24, 1975, Garuda Indonesia Flight 150 crashed on approach to Talang Betutu Airport. The accident, which was attributed to poor weather and fog, killed 25 of the 61 passengers and one person on the ground.
