= Thomas Wilkinson (VC 1942) =

Recipient of the Victoria Cross

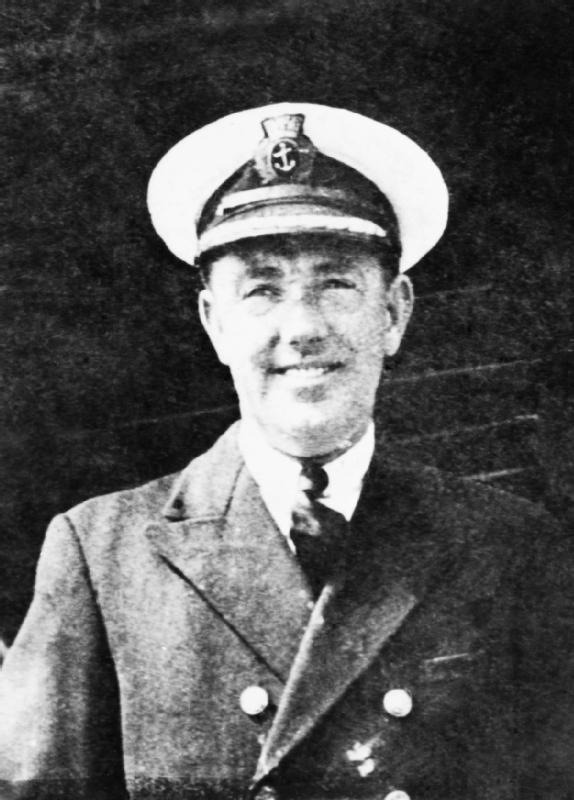
- Born: 1 August 1898; Widnes, Lancashire, England
- Died: 14 February 1942 (aged 43); HMS Li Wo, Java Sea
- Military career
- Allegiance: United Kingdom
- Branch: Royal Naval Reserve
- Rank: Lieutenant
- Commands: HMS Li Wo
- Conflicts: First World War; Second World War: Pacific War; Sinking of HMS Li Wo †
- Awards: Victoria Cross

Thomas Wilkinson, VC (1 August 1898 – 14 February 1942) was a Royal Navy sailor and a recipient of the Victoria Cross, the highest award for gallantry in the face of the enemy that can be awarded to British and Commonwealth forces.

Wilkinson was 43 years old, and a temporary lieutenant in the Royal Naval Reserve during the Second World War when the following deed took place for which he was awarded the VC:

On 14 February 1942 in the Java Sea, off Malaya, HMS Li Wo, a patrol vessel, formerly a passenger steamer, commanded by Lieutenant Wilkinson, sighted two enemy convoys, one escorted by Japanese warships, The lieutenant told his crew he had decided to engage the convoy and fight to the last in the hope of inflicting some damage, a decision that drew resolute support from the whole ship's crew. In the action that followed, a Japanese transport was set on fire and abandoned, and Li Wo engaged a heavy cruiser for over an hour before being hit at point-blank range and sunk. Lieutenant Wilkinson ordered his crew to abandon ship, but he went down with Li Wo.

His VC is in the Imperial War Museum.

== Gallery ==
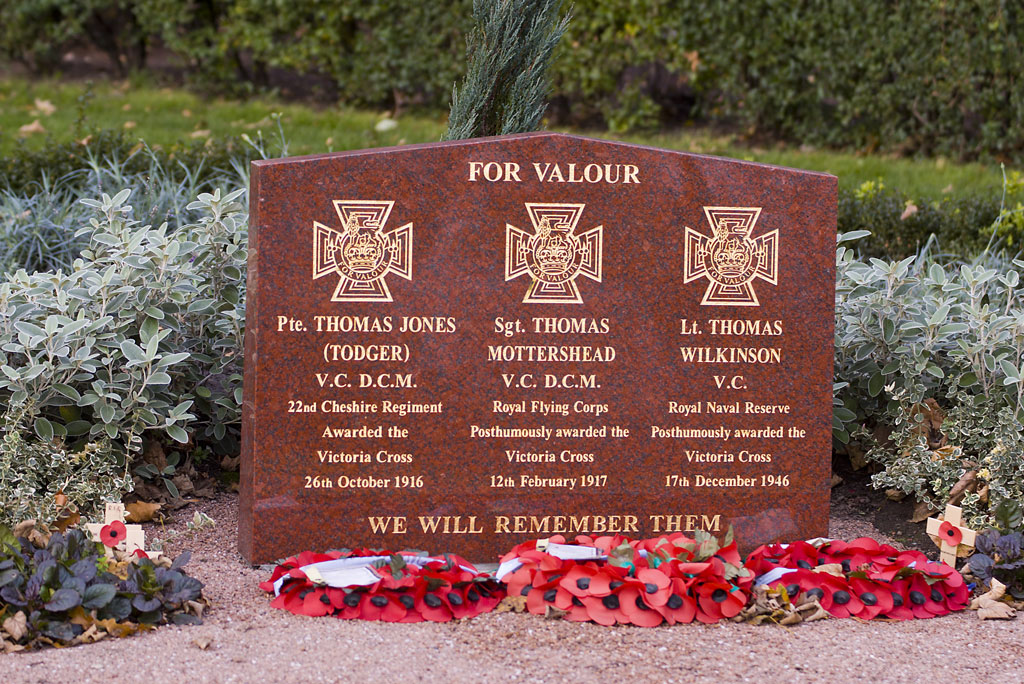
Memorial in Victoria Park, Widnes

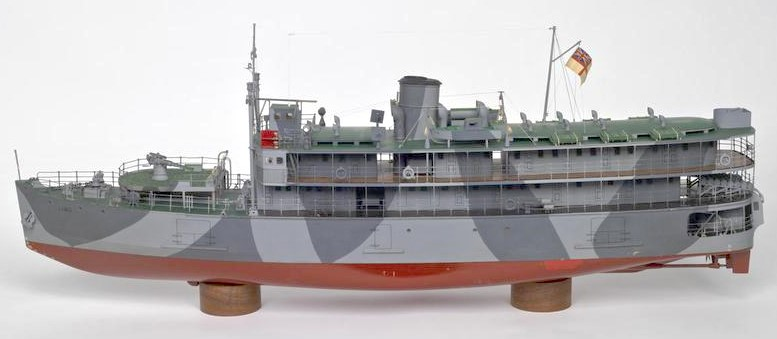
Scale model of HMS Li Wo
