= HMS Li Wo =

Auxiliary patrol vessel of the British Royal Navy

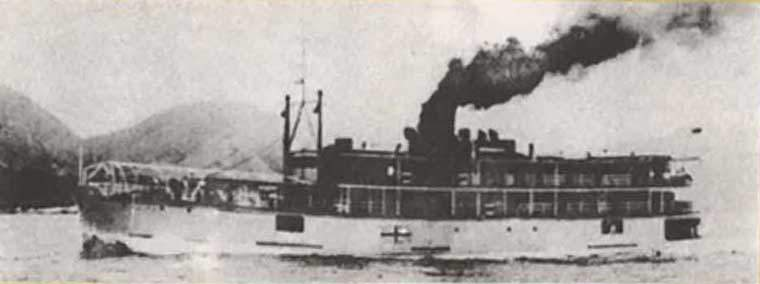

History

Hong Kong
- Name: SS Li Wo
- Owner: Indo-China Steam Navigation
- Builder: Hong Kong and Whampoa Dock, Hong Kong
- Yard number: 778
- Launched: 1938
- Sponsored by: Mrs Henry Lo
- Fate: Requisitioned by the Royal Navy, 1940

United Kingdom
- Name: HMS Li Wo
- Acquired: By requisition, 1940
- Nickname(s): Li-Wo
- Fate: Sunk by ramming into Japanese transport ship, 14 February 1942

General characteristics (in RN service)
- Type: Auxiliary patrol vessel
- Tonnage: 707 GRT
- Length: 49.9 m (164 ft)
- Beam: 9.2 m (30 ft)
- Draught: 2.8 m (9 ft 2 in)
- Propulsion: 2 × triple expansion steam engines; 278 nhp; 2 screws
- Complement: 84
- Armament: 1 × 4 in (100 mm) gun; 2 × Lewis guns

HMS Li Wo was an auxiliary patrol vessel of the British Royal Navy, which was sunk on 14 February 1942 by Japanese warships as she single-handedly attacked an enemy convoy during the Malayan Campaign.

== Ship history ==
The Li Wo was a passenger riverboat built by the Hong Kong & Whampoa Dock Company for the Indo-China Steam Navigation Company Ltd. for service on the Yangtze River. In 1940 she was requisitioned and commissioned into the Royal Navy at Singapore.

Shortly before the British surrender, Li Wo was ordered to head for the safety of Batavia in the Dutch East Indies. Her crew consisted of 84 men, mostly naval reservists, but also included several survivors from the Prince of Wales and Repulse, five men from the Army, two from the RAF, ten Malayans, and six Chinese.

She left Singapore at dawn on 13 February 1942, and was attacked several times from the air, suffering some damage. The next day while passing north of the Bangka Strait, she encountered a convoy of Japanese transport ships accompanied by a squadron of warships launching "Operation L", the invasion of Sumatra. The commander of Li Wo, Temporary Lieutenant Thomas Wilkinson RNR, informed the ship's company that he intended to close and attack the enemy.

Li Wo altered course towards the leading transport ship of the convoy at full speed, unfurling her battle ensign, and opening fire with her four-inch gun (for which she had only 13 shells, plus three practice rounds). She scored a number of direct hits on the transport, starting fires aboard, and causing the troops aboard to abandon ship. She then attacked another transport ship with machine gun fire.

Li Wo was then heavily shelled by the light cruiser Yura and the destroyers Fubuki and Asagiri. Out of ammunition and now sinking, she rammed the first enemy transport, which later sank, before finally sinking herself. Of the 84 crew, only 7 survived to be taken prisoner.

== Awards ==
Lieutenant Wilkinson, the captain, posthumously received the Victoria Cross, while his first lieutenant, Temporary Sub-Lieutenant Ronald George Gladstone Stanton RNR was awarded the Distinguished Service Order. The Conspicuous Gallantry Medal was awarded to Acting Petty Officer Arthur William Thompson and the Distinguished Service Medal to Leading Seaman Victor Spencer and Able Seaman Albert Spendlove. A further six crew were mentioned in dispatches, three of them posthumously.

== Oral Account ==
Petty Officer Arthur William Thompson survived the sinking and later recorded an oral account of the incident for the Imperial War Museum in which he described the attempts by Chief Petty Officer Charles "Lofty" Rogers to fight off attacking Japanese aircraft.
