= HNLMS Pro Patria =

Minelayer of the Royal Netherlands Navy

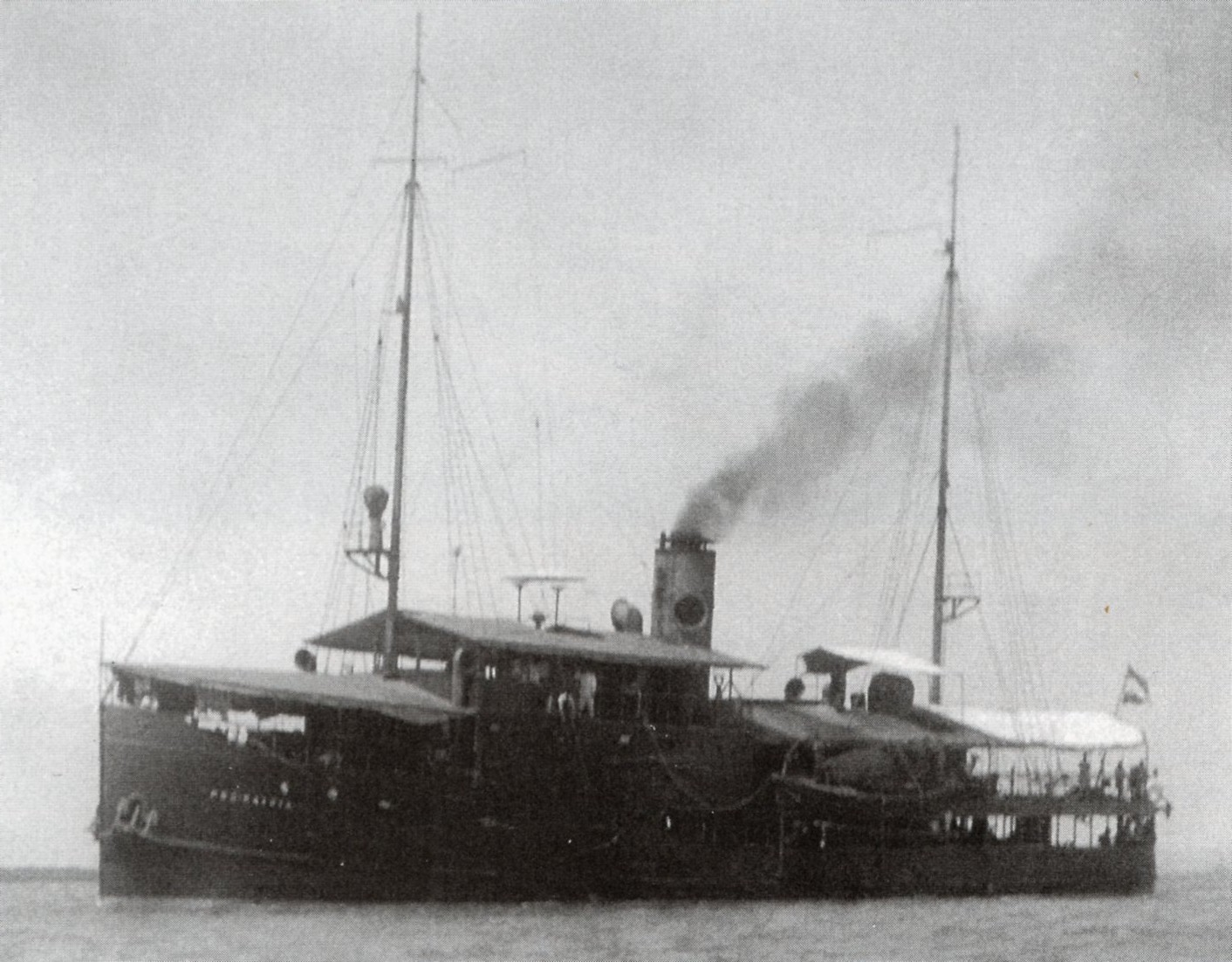
- Pro Patria

History

Netherlands
- Name: Pro Patria
- Operator: Royal Netherlands Navy
- Builder: Marine Etablissement te Soerabaja
- Laid down: 1920
- Launched: 17 July 1922
- Commissioned: 20 August 1923
- Fate: Scuttled on 15 February 1942

General characteristics
- Type: Minelayer
- Displacement: 537 t (529 long tons) (standard)
- Length: 47 m (154 ft 2 in) (p/p}
- Beam: 8.6 m (28 ft 3 in)
- Draught: 2.3 m (7 ft 7 in)
- Installed power: 650 hp (480 kW)
- Propulsion: 1 propeller; 1 xtriple-expansion steam engine
- Speed: 10 knots (19 km/h; 12 mph)
- Crew: 61
- Armament: 2 × single 7.5 cm (3 in) AA guns; 2 × single 12.7 mm (0.50 in) machine guns; 80 mines

HNLMS Pro Patria was a minelayer built for the Royal Netherlands Navy (RNN) in the Dutch East Indies during the 1920s. Completed in 1923, she played a minor role in the first year of the Pacific War. The ship was scuttled by her crew in early 1942 to prevent her capture by the Japanese.

== Description ==
Pro Patria had a standard displacement of 537 long tons (546 t) and 612 t (602 long tons) at normal load. She measured 47 metres (154 ft 2 in) long between perpendiculars with a beam of 8.6 m (28 ft 3 in) and a draught of 2.3 m (7 ft 7 in). The minelayer was powered by a vertical triple expansion engine that turned a single propeller shaft. The engine received enough steam to make 485 kilowatts (650 ihp) and give it a speed of 10 knots (19 km/h; 12 mph). The Pro Patria had a complement of 61 officers and ratings. The ship was armed with two 75-millimetre (3 in) anti-aircraft guns and two single-mounted 12.7 millimetres (0.50 in) machine guns. She carried 80 naval mines.

== Construction and career ==
Pro Patria was laid down in 1920 and launched on 17 July 1922 at the Marine Etablissement te Soerabaja (MES) in the Dutch East Indies. The ship was commissioned on 20 August 1923. It was the first warship to be fully built at the MES. After being commissioned the ship was also used as listening school and as torpedo work ship (Dutch: Torpedowerkschip).

During the Second World War the ship mined several bodies of waters in the Dutch East Indies. On 15 February 1942. Pro Patria was scuttled in the Moesi River above Palembang by its crew.
