= Sultan Mahmud Badaruddin II International Airport LRT station =

Airport railway station in Indonesia

P01 Sultan Mahmud Badaruddin II International Airport
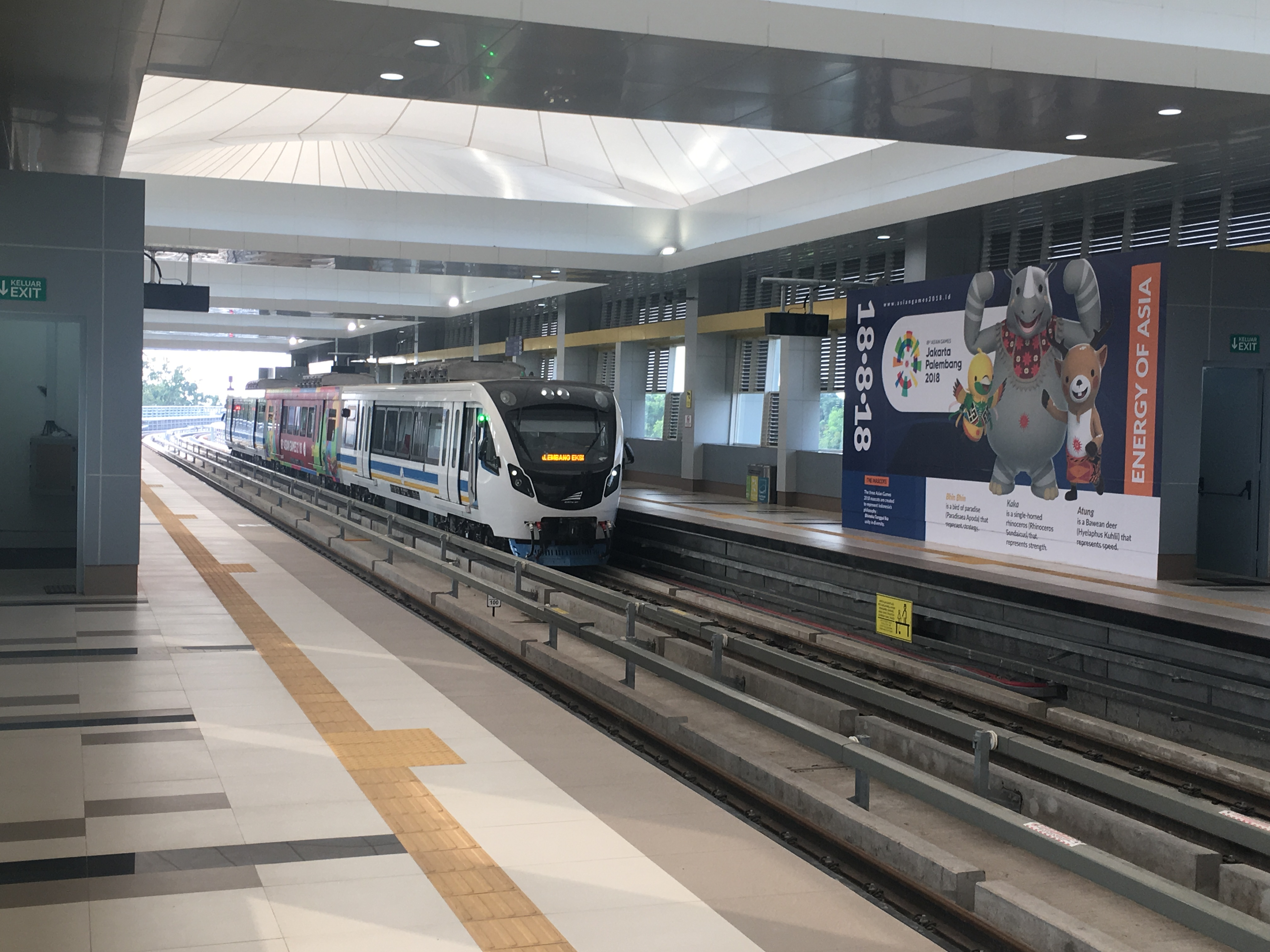
- A train arriving at Sultan Mahmud Badaruddin II International Airport Station, Photo was taken on 12 August 2018

General information
- Other names: SMB II International Airport Station
- Location: Jl. Bandara Sultan Mahmud Badaruddin II, Talang Betutu, Sukarame, Palembang; South Sumatra; Indonesia
- Coordinates: 2.894095°S 104.705593°E
- System: Palembang LRT station
- Owner: Kereta Api Indonesia
- Operator: Kereta Api Indonesia
- Line: Line 1
- Platforms: 2 side platforms
- Tracks: 2

Construction
- Structure type: Elevated
- Parking: Available
- Cycle facilities: None
- Accessible: Available

Other information
- Station code: BDR
- IATA code: PLM

History
- Opened: 23 July 2018 trial 1 August 2018 full

Services
Preceding station	Palembang LRT	Following station
Terminus	Line 1	Asrama Haji towards DJKA
Location
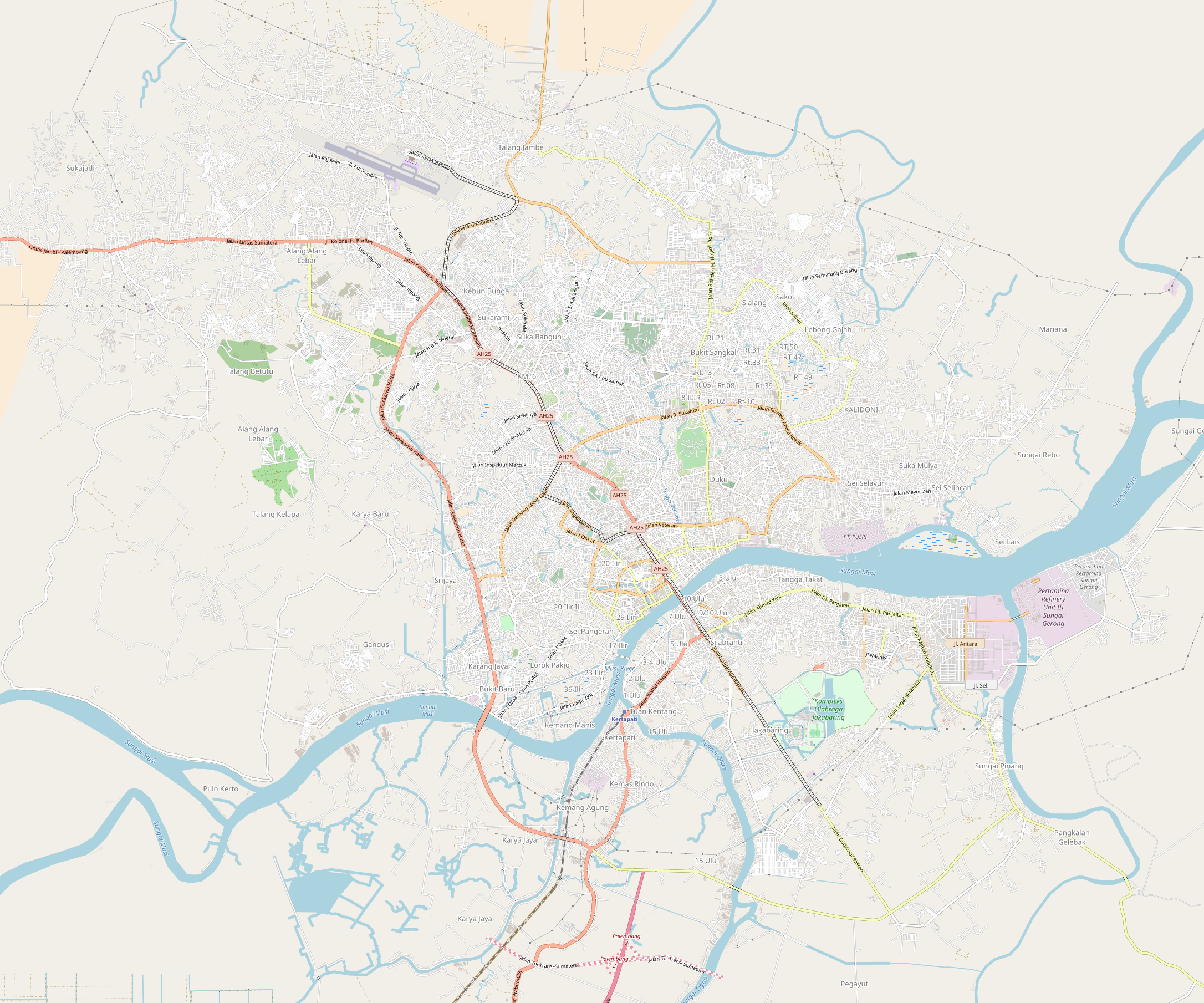
- Location within Palembang

Sultan Mahmud Badaruddin II International Airport Station or SMB II International Airport Station is a station of the Palembang LRT Line 1 in Indonesia. It is located within the airport complex.

The station is one of six that opened at the Palembang LRT launch on 1 August 2018.

== Station layout ==
2F; Platforms	Side platform, doors will open on the right
2F; Platforms	Platform 1	→ LRT Line 1 towards DJKA →
2F; Platforms	Platform 2	→ LRT Line 1 towards DJKA →
2F; Platforms	Side platform, doors will open on the right
1F	Concourse	Fare gates, ticket booths, station control, shops, musalla
G	Street Level	Parking
