= DJKA LRT station =

LRT station in Indonesia

P13 DJKA
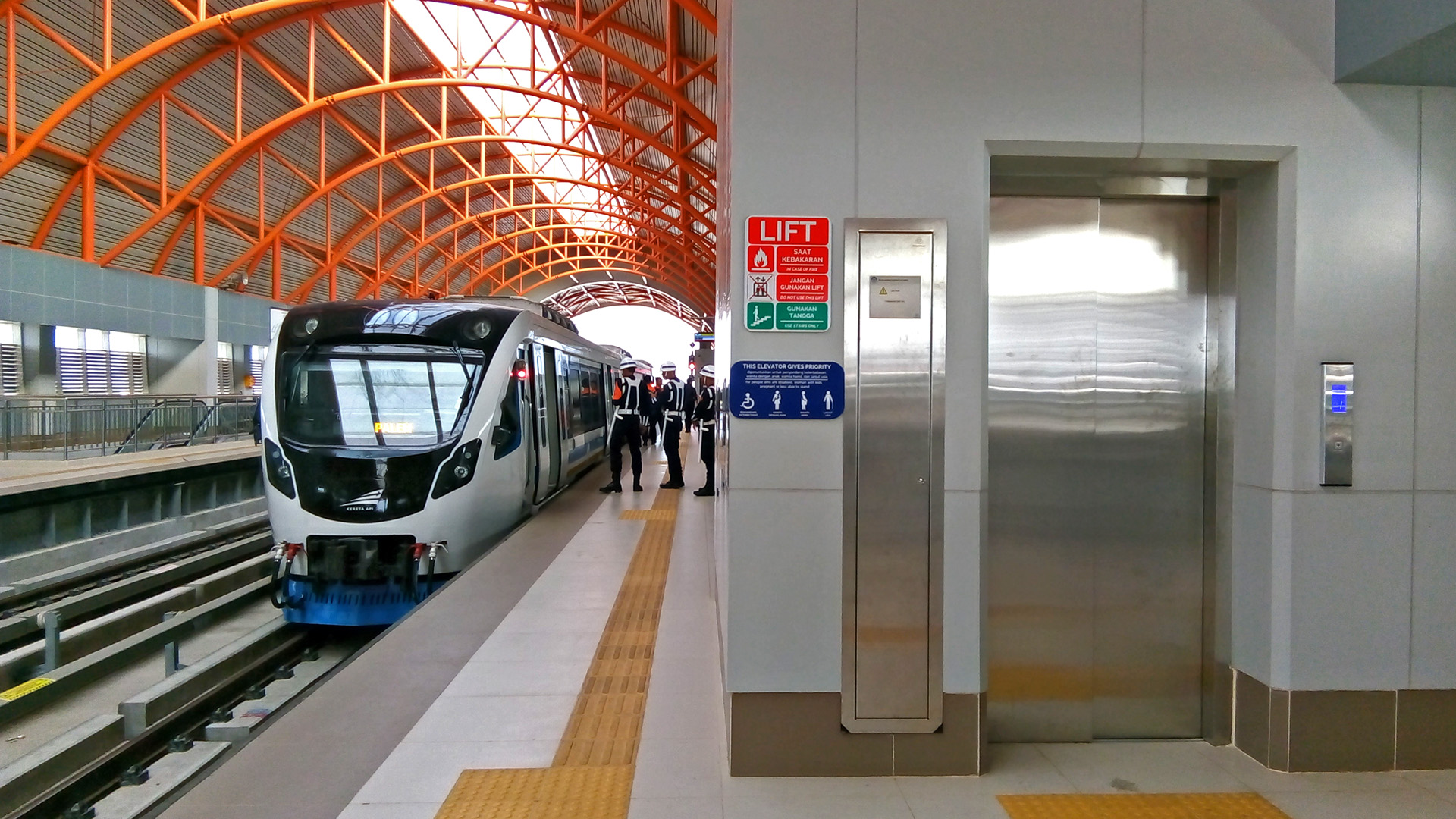
- A train arriving at DJKA Station, photo was taken on 14 August 2018

General information
- Location: Jl. Gubernur H. A Bastari, Sungai Kedukan, Rambutan, Banyuasin Regency; South Sumatra; Indonesia
- Coordinates: 3.031516°S 104.790323°E
- System: Palembang LRT station
- Owner: Indonesian Railway Company
- Operator: Indonesian Railway Company
- Line: Line 1
- Platforms: 2 side platforms
- Tracks: 2

Construction
- Structure type: Elevated
- Parking: none
- Cycle facilities: none
- Accessible: Available

Other information
- Station code: BTP

History
- Opened: 23 July 2018 trial 1 August 2018 full

Services
Preceding station	Palembang LRT	Following station
Jakabaring towards SMB II	Line 1	Terminus
Location
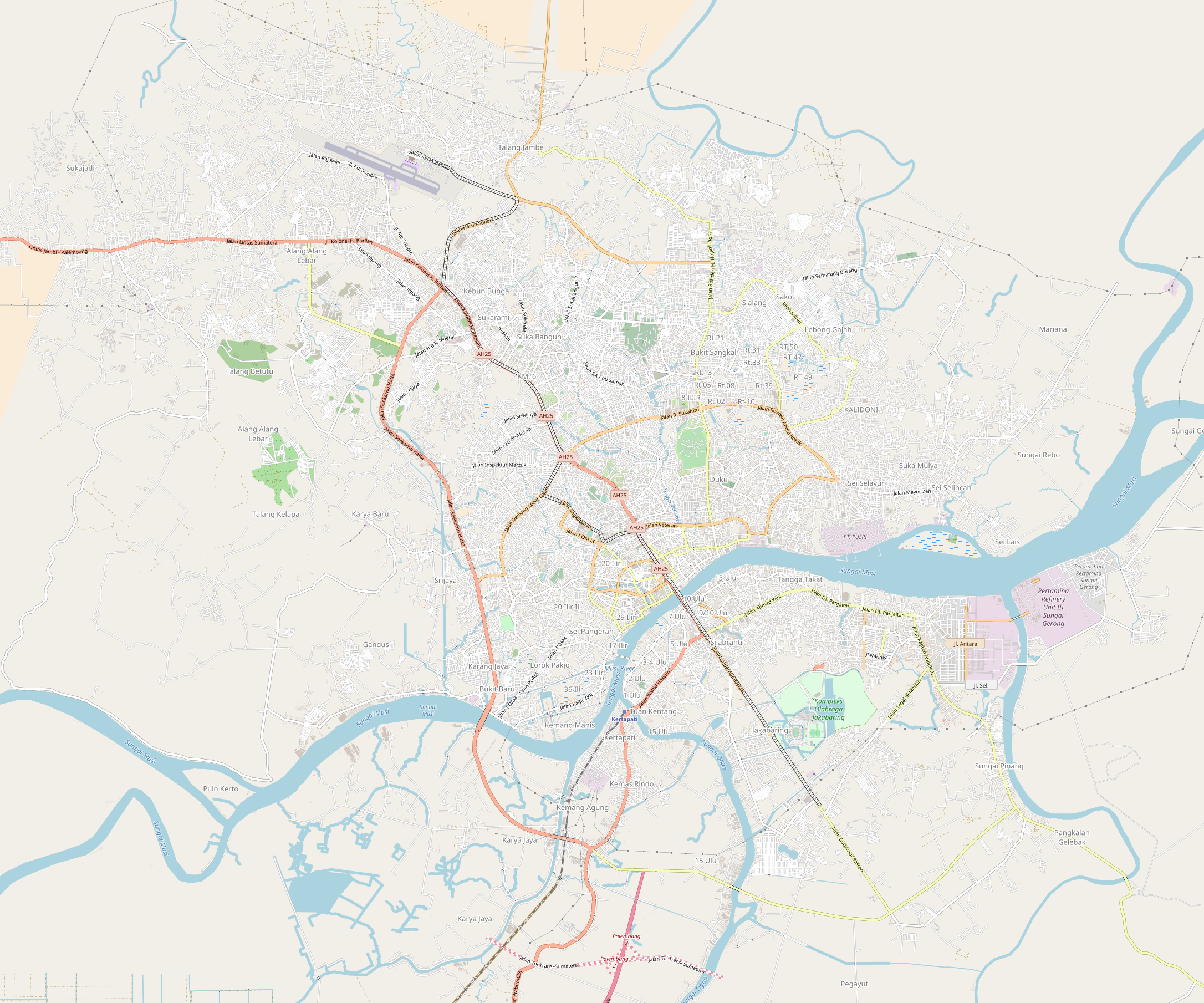
- Location within Palembang

DJKA Station is a station of the Palembang LRT Line 1. located in the town of Rambutan, Banyuasin Regency.

The station is close to the Ogan Permata Indah Mall. The station became one of six stations that opened at the Palembang LRT launch on 1 August 2018.

The station is probably named after Directorate General of Railways (Indonesian: Direktorat Jenderal Perkeretaapian, abbreviated as DJKA) of Ministry of Transportation, one of the co-owners of the system's track.

== Station layout ==
2F; Platforms	Side platform, doors will open on the right
2F; Platforms	Platform 1	← LRT Line 1 towards SMB II
2F; Platforms	Platform 2	← LRT Line 1 towards SMB II
2F; Platforms	Side platform, doors will open on the right
1F	Concourse	Faregates, Ticket Booths, Station Control, Shops, Musalla
G	Street Level	Parking (plan)
