= Cholil Aziz =

Indonesian politician and civil servant

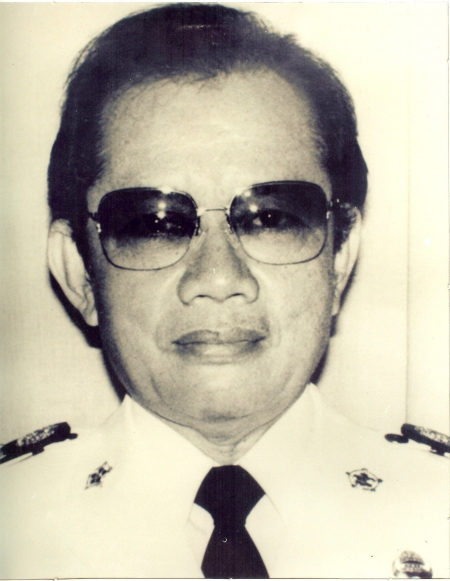

Mayor of Palembang
- In office July 1983 – July 1993
- Preceded by: H. A. Dahlan
- Succeeded by: Husni

Acting Regent of Musi Rawas
- In office 1978–1980
- Preceded by: Mochtar Aman
- Succeeded by: M Syueb Tamat

Personal details
- Born: 3 October 1932; Lahat, Dutch East Indies
- Died: 8 January 2011 (aged 78)

Cholil Aziz (3 October 1932 – 8 January 2011) or Kholil Aziz was an Indonesian politician and civil servant who was the mayor of Palembang, South Sumatra for two terms between 1983 and 1993.

== Early life ==
Cholil Aziz was born in the village of Gunung Meraksa in Lahat Regency on 3 October 1932. He obtained his bachelor's degree in law at Gadjah Mada University in Yogyakarta.

== Career ==
After completing his law degree, he became the city secretary of Palembang from 1961 to 1970. He then became director of a home government academy in Palembang (APDN) until 1978. His next position was as the acting regent of Musi Rawas Regency until 1980, between the regencies of Mochtar Aman and M Syueb Tamat. He was that assistant to the governor of South Sumatra for the Bangka Belitung Islands region until 1983.

In July 1983, he became mayor of Palembang. He was reelected in 1988, winning 38 of the 45 votes cast by the Palembang city council. During his mayoralship, the city government demolished private buildings in a rebuilding effort after a fire in the city, which resulted in a lawsuit where the city government loss and had to pay a fine. Aziz's city government created a spatial planning master plan for the city. He also planned a project to improve the Great Mosque of Palembang with the participation of architects from the Bandung Institute of Technology, but the project was cancelled due to lack of funding.

He died on 8 January 2011.
