= Husni (Indonesian politician) =

Indonesian politician

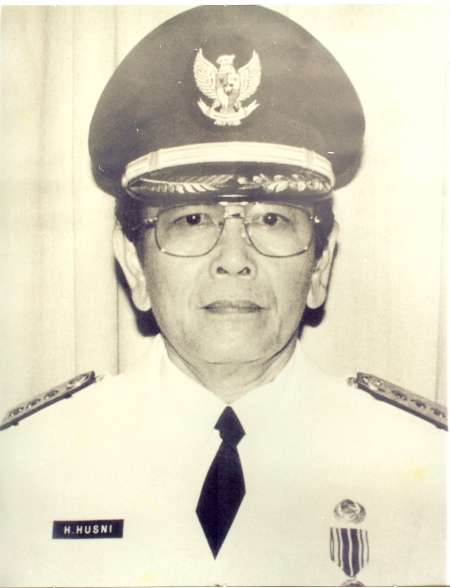

Mayor of Palembang
- In office 17 July 1993 – 2003
- Preceded by: Kholil Aziz
- Succeeded by: Eddy Santana Putra

Personal details
- Born: 26 July 1936 Lahat, Dutch East Indies
- Died: 11 January 2022 (aged 85) Palembang, South Sumatra, Indonesia

Husni (26 July 1936 – 11 January 2022) was an Indonesian politician and civil servant who served as the mayor of Palembang, South Sumatra between 1993 and 2003. Prior to becoming mayor, he worked in various positions in the bureaucracy of South Sumatra's provincial government.

== Early life ==
Husni was born on 26 July 1936 in Bandar Agung, today part of Lahat Regency in South Sumatra. He was the son of Zainal and Siti Maimunah. Zainal was a retired government employee. He studied in Lahat for a time, moving to Jakarta for high school and later obtained a bachelor's degree from Gadjah Mada University in 1963.

== Career ==
Husni worked as a government official, and before becoming mayor of Palembang he had been assistant to the provincial secretary of South Sumatra, and he also served as the regional secretary of Ogan Komering Ulu Regency. In 1990 and 1992, he received civil service awards from president Suharto and the Ministry of Home Affairs, respectively.

On 19 June 1993, the Palembang city council elected him as mayor, with Husni winning 26 of 45 cast votes, defeating the city secretary who won 16. He was sworn in on 17 July 1993. His election for a second term occurred during the civil unrest following the fall of Suharto.

== Family and death ==
Husni married Ailuny Husni (d. 28 January 2022) in 1963, and the couple had seven children. Their second child Febrita Lusia married Herman Deru, who was later elected as governor of South Sumatra.

He died on 11 January 2022 in Palembang, and was buried on the same day in his family's cemetery within the city.
