= Palembang City Regional House of Representatives =

Municipal legislature of the city of Palembang, South Sumatra, Indonesia

Coordinates: 03°00′04″S 104°46′16″E

Palembang City Regional House of Representatives Dewan Perwakilan Rakyat Daerah Kota Palembang
- 2024–2029 period

Type
- Type: Unicameral

Leadership
- Speaker: Ali Subri, Nasdem since 14 October 2024
- Deputy Speaker: Hari Apriansyah, Gerindra since 14 October 2024
- Deputy Speaker: M. Hidayat, Golkar since 14 October 2024
- Deputy Speaker: Zainal Abidin, Democratic since 14 October 2024

Structure
- Seats: 50
- Political groups: Government (45): Nasdem (9); Golkar (8); Gerindra (8); Democratic (6); PKS (5); PAN (5); PKB (4); Opposition (5): PDI-P (5)

Elections
- Voting system: Open list
- Last general election: 14 February 2024
- Next general election: 2029

Website
- dprdkota.palembang.go.id

The Palembang City Regional House of Representatives (Indonesian: Dewan Perwakilan Rakyat Daerah Kota Palembang abbreviated to DPRD Palembang) is the unicameral municipal legislature of the city of Palembang, South Sumatra, Indonesia. It has 50 members, who are elected every five years, simultaneously with the national legislative election.

== History ==
While under Dutch control since 1821, Palembang did not have a colonial municipal government until 1906, with the city being run by the Palembang Residency. The city council (Gemeenteraad) was created in 1906, and it initially had 13 members – eight Europeans, 3 Native Indonesians, and 2 representatives of other Asian communities. These initial 13 members would serve until 1919, when Palembang's mayor was appointed and he took leadership of the city council. After 1919, five-year terms were introduced. Membership of the council was gradually increased, with 15 members in 1919 and 19 in 1923.

Early in the Indonesian National Revolution, Republican authorities in Palembang formed a regional house of representatives with 30 members. Returning Dutch forces took control of Palembang, and in 1948 incorporated it within the federal State of South Sumatra. In 1956, an emergency law gave Palembang the status of a "large city", and set the number of legislators in the regional house of representatives to 25. There were 40 councillors after the 1971 election, including six representatives of the Indonesian National Armed Forces, and 45 councillors after the 1977 election.

== Building ==
During the Dutch colonial period, the city council was based in what is today the Palembang Mayoral Office. In 1977, the council moved into a purpose built legislative building, and moved again in 2010 into a newer building. The newer building, built on a 2-hectare plot at a cost of Rp 66.8 billion, was claimed to be the "most luxurious" of Indonesian municipal legislature buildings. By 2011, local media outlet Sriwijaya Post had reported significant deterioration to the building's interior.

== Composition ==
For the 2024 Indonesian legislative election, 50 members were elected into the legislature from six multi-member electoral districts. The current speaker is Ali Subri of the NasDem Party, who was sworn in on 14 October 2024.

| Legislative period | Nasdem | Demokrat | Gerindra | PDI-P | PAN | PKB | Golkar | PKS | PPP | Hanura | PBB | Barnas | PBR | PPRN | Total |
| 2009–2014 | | 11 | 5 | 7 | 2 | 2 | 7 | 5 | 3 | 5 | – | 1 | 1 | 1 | 50 |
| 2014–2019 | 5 | 7 | 5 | 9 | 3 | 5 | 6 | 3 | 2 | 3 | 2 | | | | 50 |
| 2019–2024 | 3 | 9 | 8 | 7 | 6 | 6 | 5 | 5 | 1 | – | – | | | | 50 |
| 2024–2029 | 9 | 6 | 8 | 5 | 5 | 4 | 8 | 5 | – | – | – | | | | 50 |
