= Palembang =

Capital and largest city of South Sumatra, Indonesia

- City
- City of Palembang; Kota Palembang

Other transcription(s)
  - Jawi: ڤليمبڠ
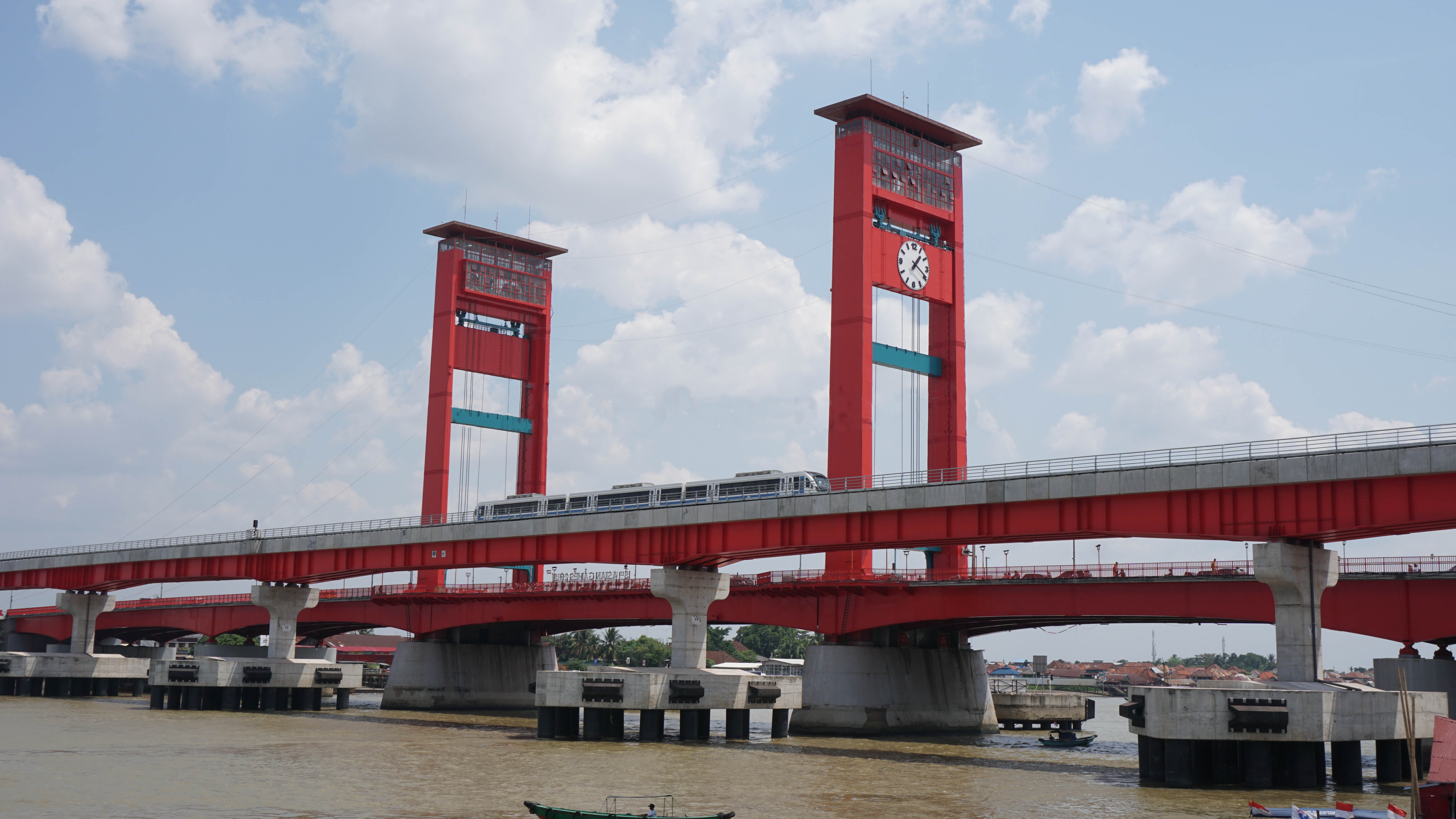
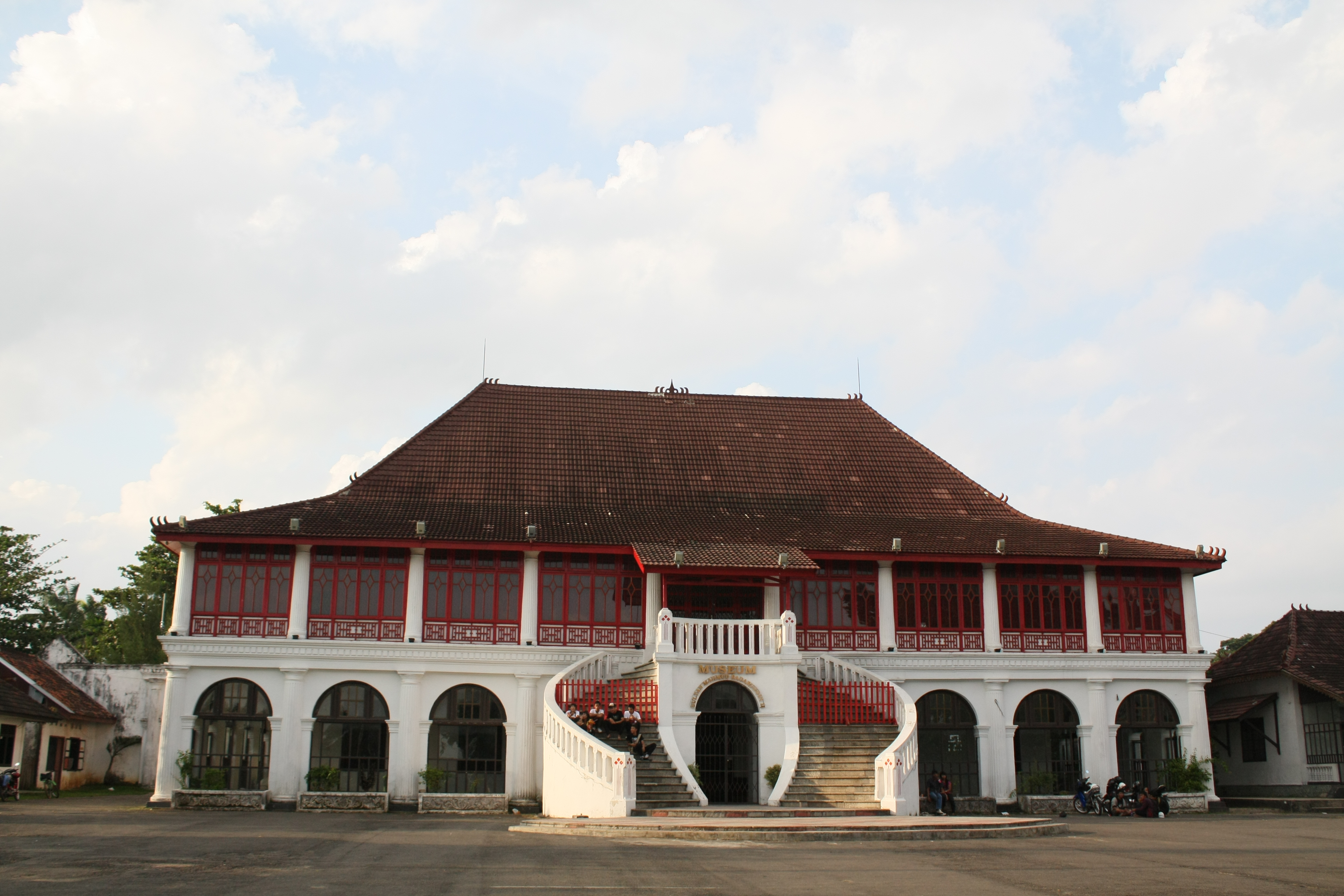
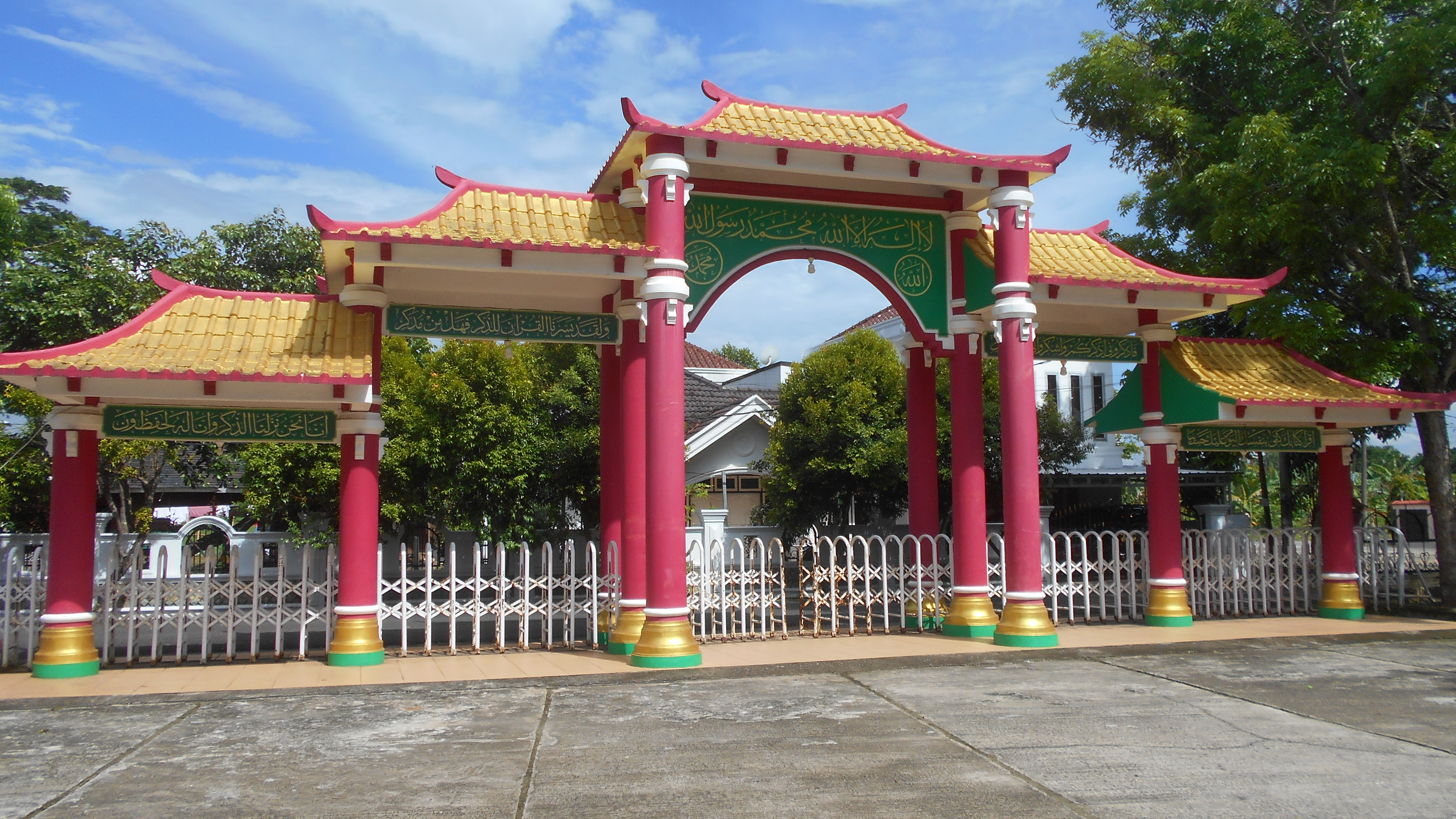
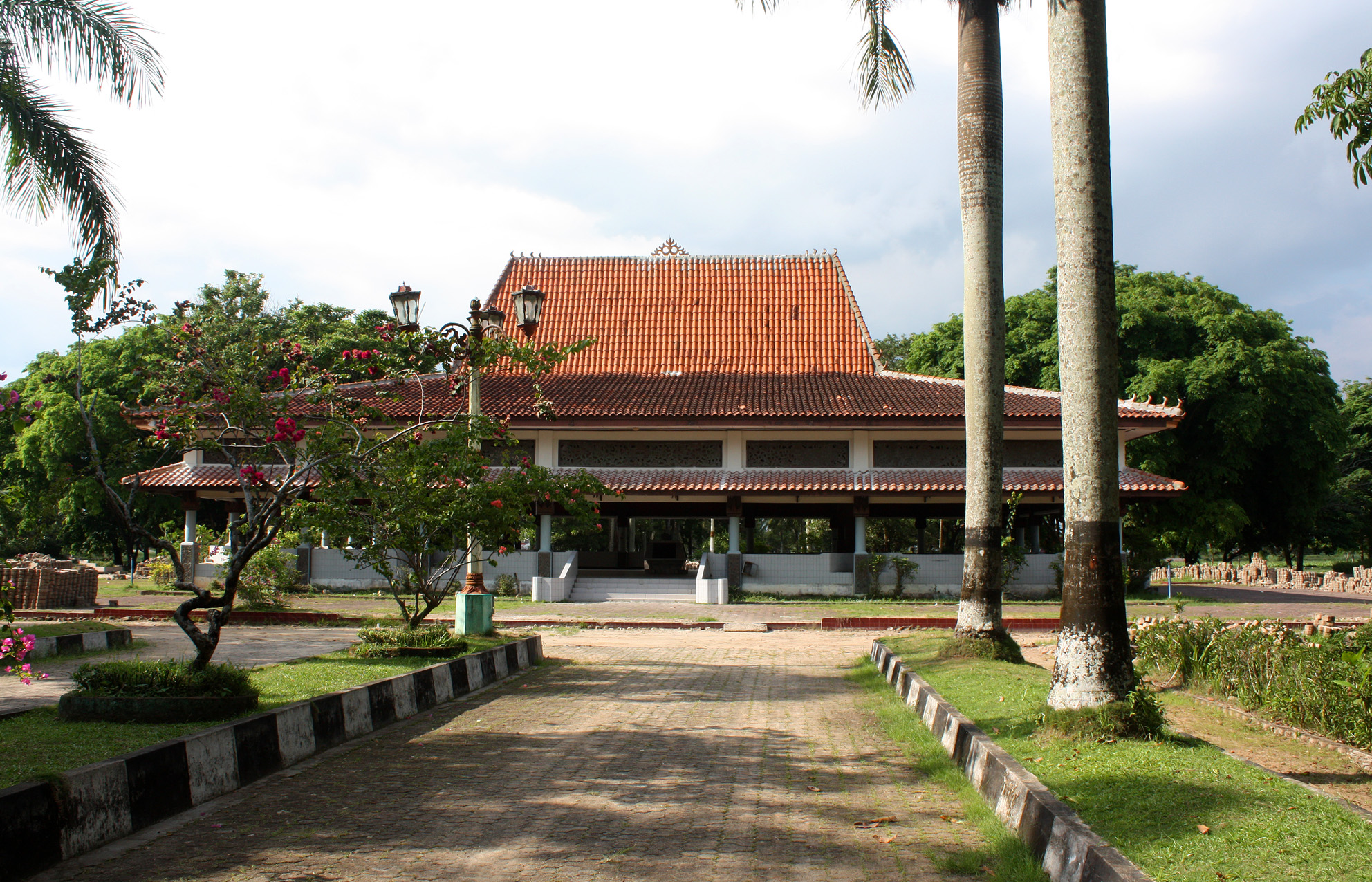
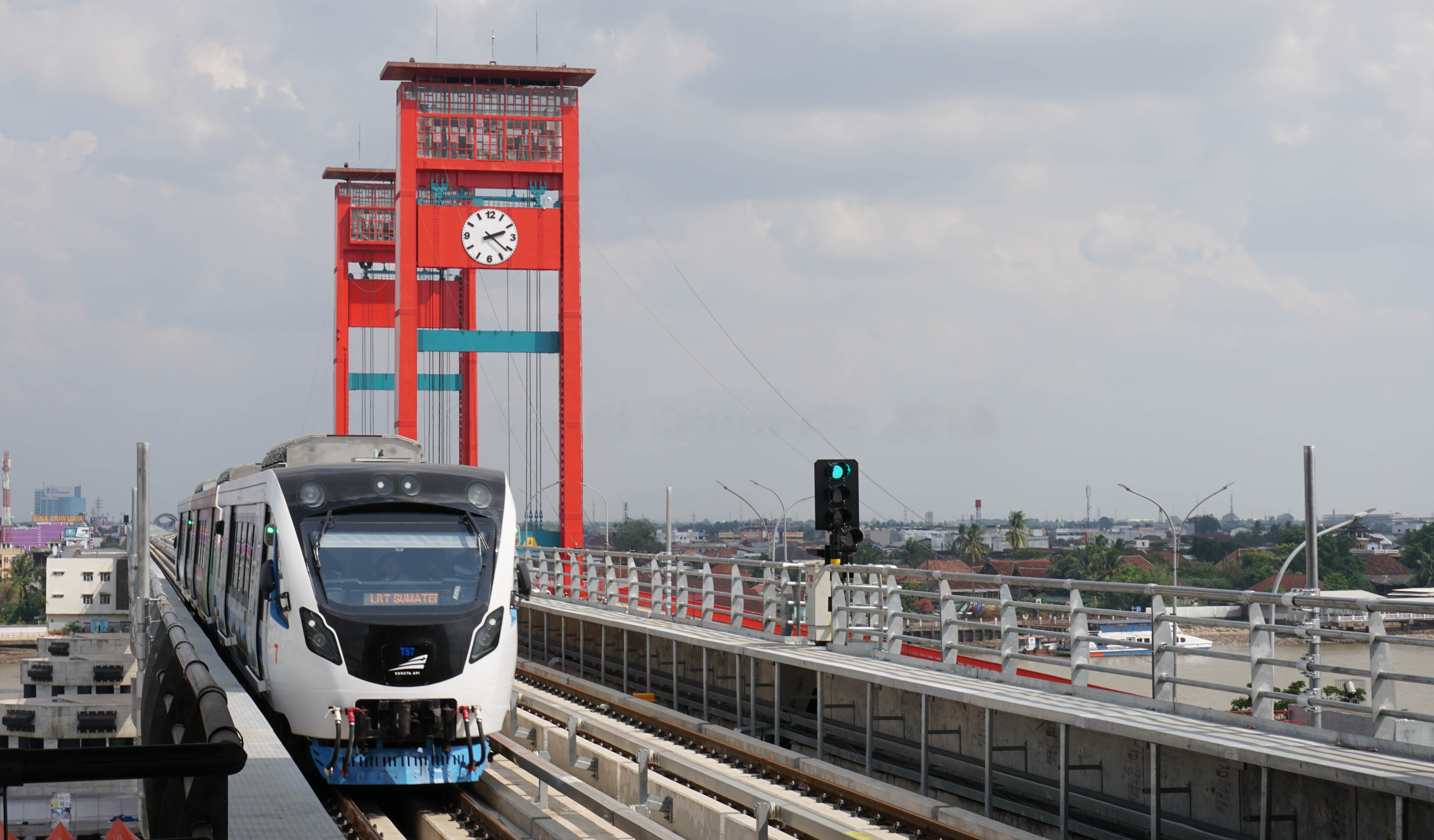
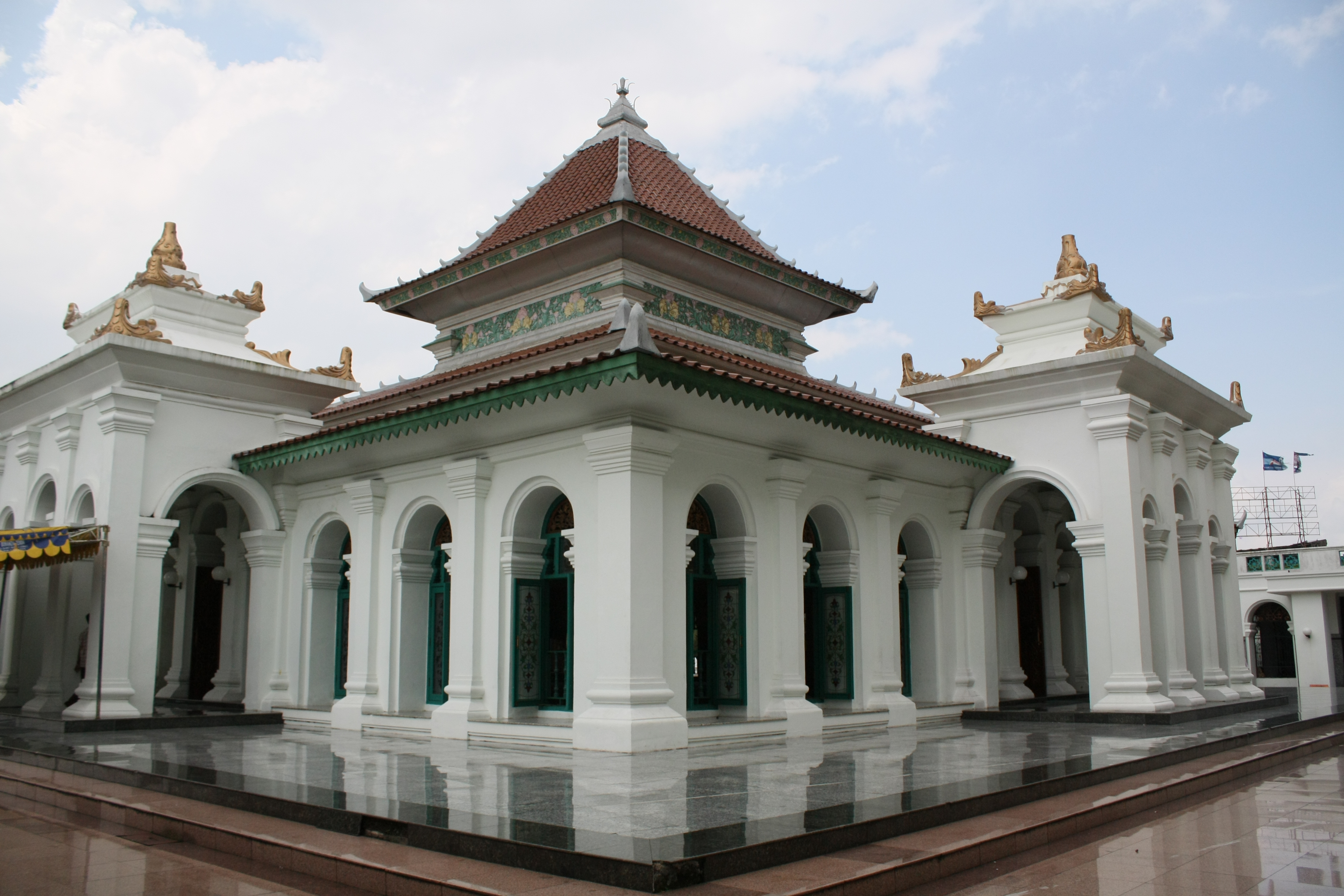
- Ampera Bridge Sultan Mahmud Badaruddin II Museum Gateway to the Cheng Ho Mosque Sriwijaya Kingdom Archaeological Park LRT Palembang Great Mosque of Palembang

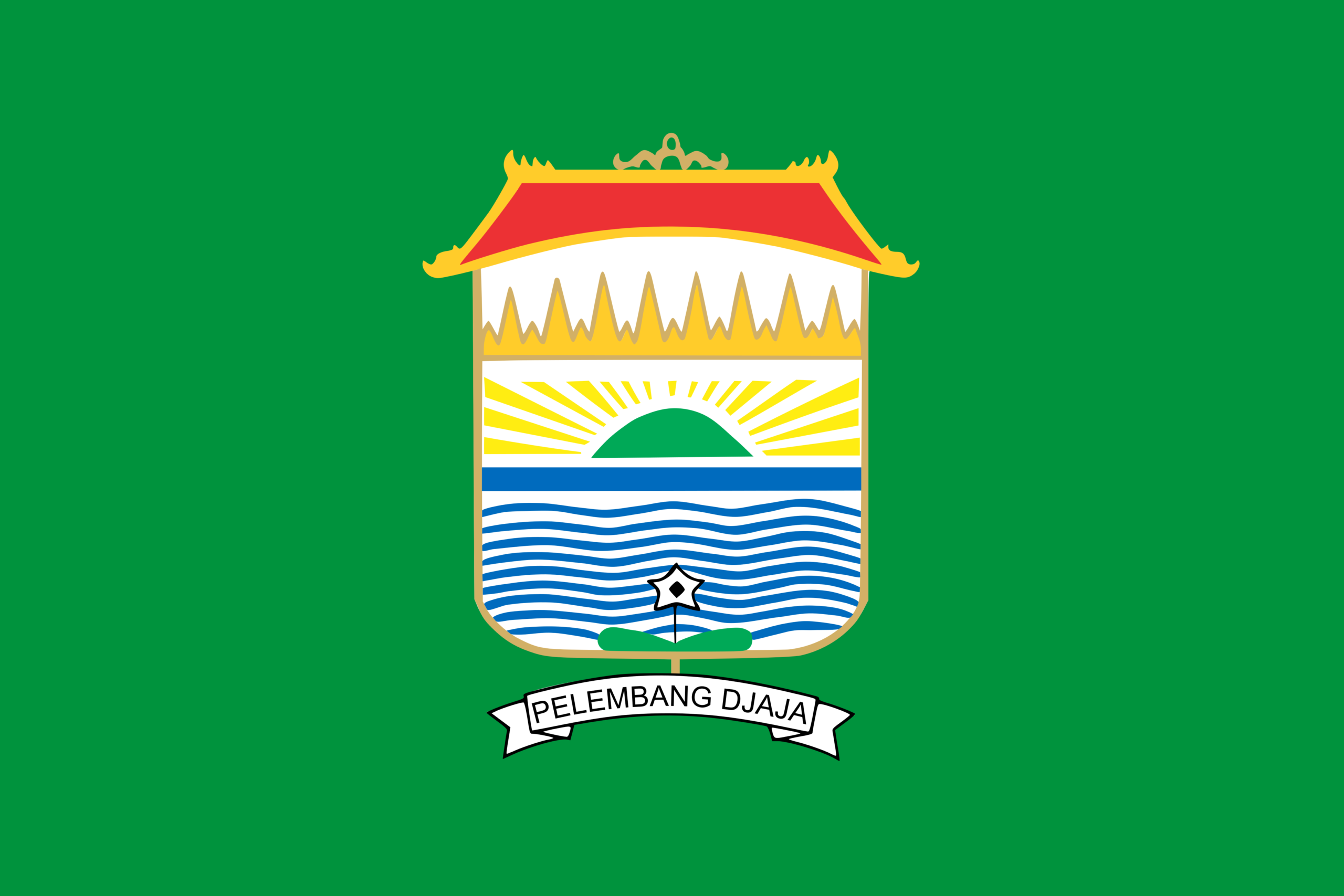
- Flag Coat of arms
- Nickname(s): Kota Pempek "City of Pempek"
- Motto: Palembang Bersih, Aman, Rapi, Indah "Palembang Clean, Safe, Neat, and Beautiful"
- Location within South Sumatra

- Location in Sumatra and Indonesia Palembang (Indonesia)
- Coordinates: 2°59′10″S 104°45′20″E
- Country: Indonesia
- Province: South Sumatra
- Metropolitan area: Patungraya Agung
- Founded: 16 June 683 (Kedukan Bukit Inscription)
- Incorporated (gemeente): 1 April 1906 (Staatsblad 1906:126)
- Incorporated (city): 26 June 1959 (Act No. 28 of 1959)

Government
  - Type: Mayor–council
  - Body: Palembang City Government
  - Mayor: Ratu Dewa (Golkar)
  - Vice Mayor: Prima Salam
  - Legislature: Palembang City Regional House of Representatives (DPRD)

Area
  - City: 348.34 km^{2} (134.49 sq mi)
  - Metro: 9,886.66 km^{2} (3,817.26 sq mi)
- Elevation: 8 m (26 ft)

Population (mid 2025 estimate)
  - City: 1,829,745
  - Rank: 8th
  - Density: 5,252.8/km^{2} (13,605/sq mi)
  - Metro: 2,706,835
  - Metro density: 273.787/km^{2} (709.104/sq mi)

Nominal GDP (nominal, 2023)
  - Total: Rp 194.570 trillion US$ 12.765 billion
  - Per capita: Rp 114.025 million US$ 7,481
- Time zone: UTC+7 (Indonesia Western Time)
- Postal code: 301xx, 302xx
- Area code: (+62) 711
- HDI (2023): ▲0.817 (34th) Very High
- Website: palembang.go.id

Palembang (Indonesian pronunciation: [paˈlɛmbaŋ], Palembang: Pelémbang, Jawi: ڤليمبڠ) is the capital city of the Indonesian province of South Sumatra. The city proper covers 348.34 square kilometres (134.49 square miles) on both banks of the Musi River in the eastern lowlands of southern Sumatra. It had a population of 1,668,848 at the 2020 Census; the official estimate as at mid 2025 was 1,829,745 (comprising 915,952 males and 913,793 females). Palembang is the second most populous city in Sumatra, after Medan, and the twelfth most populous city in Indonesia.

The Palembang metropolitan area had an estimated population of more than 2.7 million in 2025. It comprises the city and parts of regencies surrounding the city, including Banyuasin Regency (11 administrative districts), Ogan Ilir Regency (seven districts), and Ogan Komering Ilir Regency (four districts).

Palembang was the capital of Srivijaya, a Buddhist kingdom that ruled much of the western Indonesian archipelago and controlled many maritime trade routes, including the Strait of Malacca.

Palembang was incorporated into the Dutch East Indies in 1825 after the abolition of the Palembang Sultanate. It was chartered as a city on 1 April 1906.

Palembang was the host city of the 2011 Southeast Asian Games and the 2018 Asian Games along with Jakarta. The first light rail system in Indonesia was operated in Palembang in July 2018.

The city attracted 2,011,417 tourists in 2017, including 9,850 foreign tourists. Traffic jams, floods, slums, pollution, and peatland fire are problems in Palembang.

The city of Neiva in Colombia is the antipode of Palembang. Palembang and Neiva are the only pair of antipodal cities in the world where both cities have a population of above 300,000 people.

== Etymology ==
Some believe that the name "Palembang" is derived from the word limbang in Malay. By adding the prefix pe- which indicates a place or situation, the city's name means "a place to pan gold and diamond ores". It is said that during antiquity, the ruler ordered gold and diamond miners to pan their ores in the city for security and surveillance reasons.

Others say that the name comes from the word lembang in Malay. By adding the same prefix, the city's name means "a place where the water leaks". It also means "a place which was constantly inundated by water". It refers to the geographical features of Palembang, which is a wetland.

Some say that the name was given by four brothers who survived a shipwreck near Musi River during the Majapahit reign. It is said that on their way to a new colony in eastern Sumatra when their ship was wrecked, all belongings in the ship sunk into the sea except a broken wooden box which the survivor used as rafts. The rafts were wobbled (limbang-limbang) by the waves until they drifted ashore to a land which was later named Palimbang by them.

Palembang also has a special Chinese character rendition like several cities in Indonesia. In modern Chinese, Palembang is written as Jùgǎng (Chinese: 巨港; lit. 'giant port'). 巨 here is a sound-borrowing at Hokkien. Palembang is called Kū-káng (舊港) in Hokkien, meaning "Old Port"; 巨 is read as kū in certain dominant dialects of Hokkien and was thus borrowed to use in place of 舊.

== History ==
=== Srivijaya period ===
Srivijaya Archaeological Park located southwest from Palembang city centre (green). The site forms an axis connecting Bukit Seguntang and Musi River.

The Kedukan Bukit Inscription, which is dated 682 AD, is the oldest inscription found in Palembang. The inscription tells of a king who acquires magical powers and leads a large military force over water and land, setting out from Tamvan delta, arriving at a place called "Matajap," and (in the interpretation of some scholars) founding the polity of Srivijaya. The "Matajap" of the inscription is believed to be Mukha Upang, a district of Palembang.

According to George Coedes, "in the second half of the 9th century Java and Sumatra were united under the rule of a Sailendra reigning in Java...its centre at Palembang."

As the capital of the Srivijaya kingdom, this second oldest city in Southeast Asia has been an important trading centre in maritime Southeast Asia for more than a millennium. The kingdom flourished by controlling the international trade through the Strait of Malacca from the seventh to thirteenth century, establishing hegemony over polities in Sumatra and the Malay Peninsula. Sanskrit inscriptions and Chinese travelogues report that the kingdom prospered as an intermediary in the international trade between China and India. Because of the Monsoon, or biannual seasonal wind, after getting to Srivijaya, traders from China or India had to stay there for several months waiting the direction of the wind changes, or had to go back to China or India. Thus, Srivijaya grew to be the biggest international trade centre, and not only the market, but also infrastructures for traders such as lodging and entertainment also developed. It functioned as a cultural centre as well. Yijing, a Chinese Buddhist pilgrim who stayed in today's Palembang and Jambi in 671, recorded that there were more than a thousand Buddhist monks and learned scholars, sponsored by the kingdom to study religion in Palembang. He also recorded that there were many "states" under the kingdom called Srivijaya (Shili Foshi).

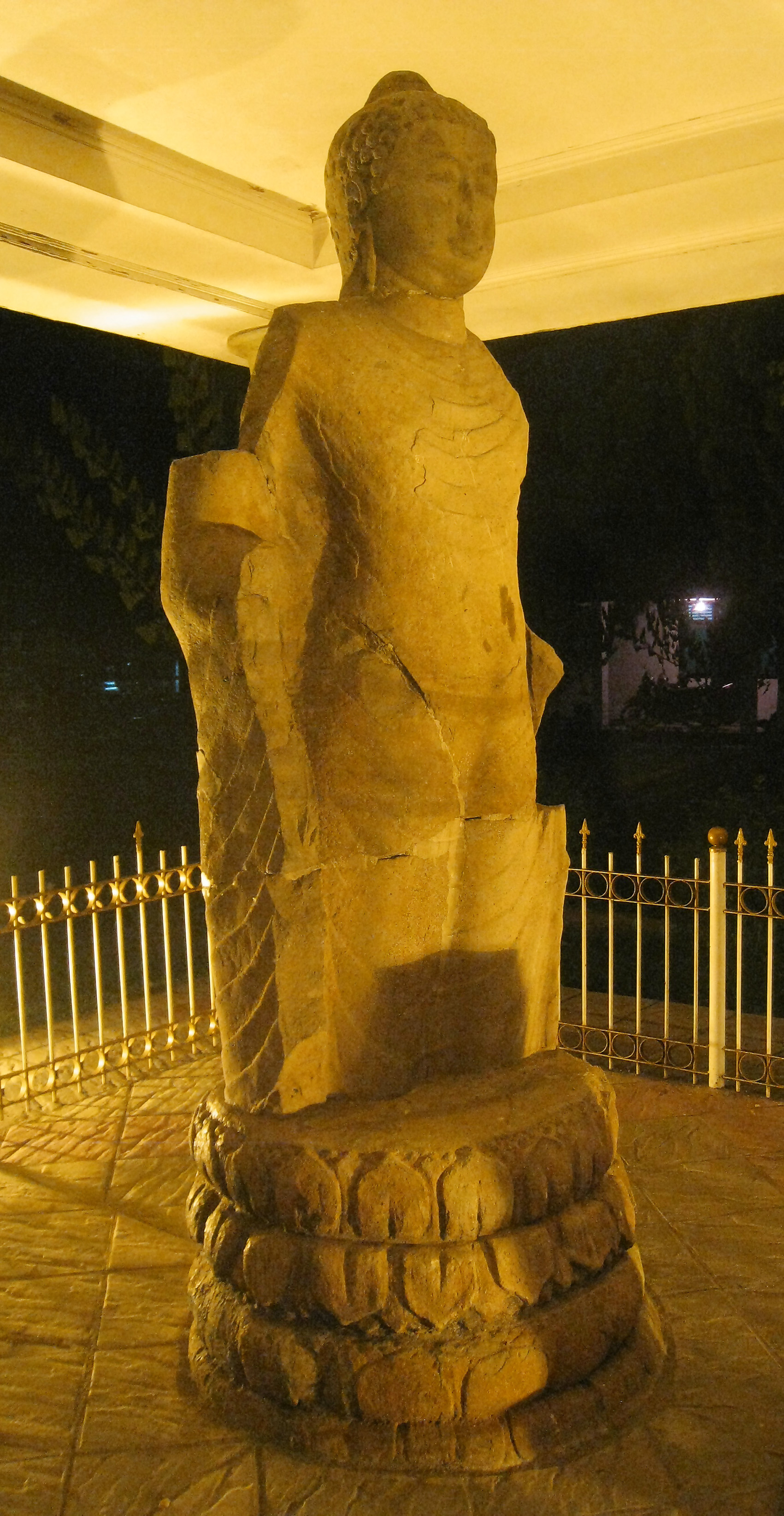
A statue of Buddha, discovered in Bukit Seguntang archaeological site, today displayed in Sultan Mahmud Badaruddin II Museum Palembang

In 990, an army from the Kingdom of Mataram in Java attacked Srivijaya. Palembang was sacked and the palace was looted. Cudamani Warmadewa, however, requested protection from China. By 1006, the invasion was finally repelled. In retaliation, Srivijaya king sent his troops to assist King Wurawari of Luaram in his revolt against Mataram. In subsequent battles, Mataram Palace was destroyed and the royal family of Mataram executed.

In 1068, King Virarajendra Chola of the Chola Dynasty of India conquered what is now Kedah from Srivijaya. Having lost many soldiers in the war and with its coffers almost empty due to the 20-year disruption of trade, the reach of Srivijaya was diminished. Its territories began to free themselves from the suzerainty of Palembang and to establish many small kingdoms all over the former empire. Srivijaya finally declined with the military expedition by Javanese kingdoms in the thirteenth century.

=== Post-Srivijaya period ===
Prince Parameswara fled from Palembang after being crushed by Javanese forces. The city was then plagued by pirates, notably Chen Zuyi and Liang Daoming. In 1407, Chen was confronted at Palembang by the returning imperial treasure fleet under Admiral Zheng He. Zheng made the opening gambit, demanding Chen's surrender and the pirate quickly signalled agreement while preparing for a surprise pre-emptive strike. But details of his plan had been provided to Zheng by a local Chinese informant, and in the fierce battle that ensued, the Ming soldiers and Ming superior armada finally destroyed the pirate fleet and killed 5,000 of its men. Chen was captured and held for public execution in Nanjing in 1407. Peace was finally restored to the Strait of Malacca as Shi Jinqing was installed as Palembang's new ruler and incorporated into what would become a far-flung system of allies who acknowledged Ming supremacy in return for diplomatic recognition, military protection, and trading rights.

=== Palembang Sultanate ===
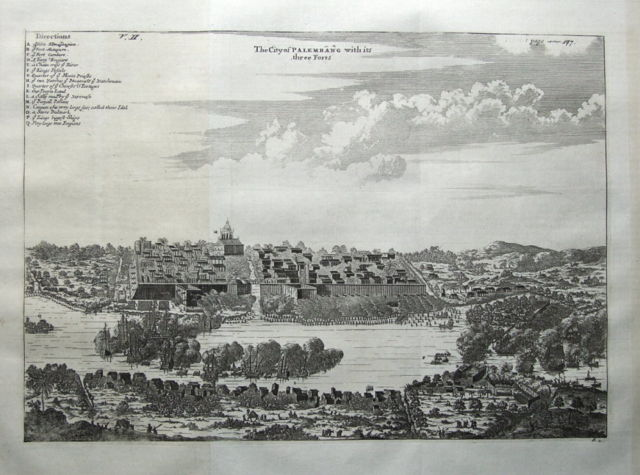
The walled city of Palembang with its three fortresses in 1682

After the Demak Sultanate fell under Kingdom of Pajang, a Demak nobleman, Geding Suro with his followers fled to Palembang and established a new dynasty. It is from this period, that Islam became the dominant religion in Palembang. The Sultanate of Palembang was proclaimed in 1659. The Grand Mosque of Palembang was built in 1738 under the reign of Sultan Mahmud Badaruddin I Jaya Wikrama, and was completed in 1748. Settlements grew along the Musi River, with some houses built on rafts. The Sultanate legislated only citizens of Palembang could reside downstream of Seberang Ilir where the palace was located, whereas non-citizens were required to reside on the opposite bank known as Seberang Ulu.

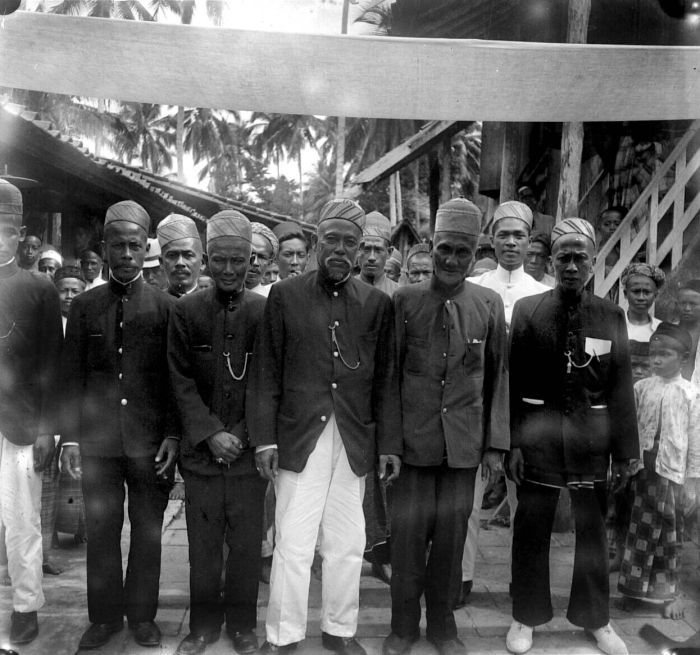
Local elders of Palembang during the Dutch colonial period

Several local rivals, such as Banten, Jambi, and Aceh threatened the existence of the Sultanate. The Dutch East India Company established a trade post in Palembang in 1619. In 1642, the company obtained monopoly over the ports pepper trade. Tensions mounted between the Dutch and locals, peaking in 1657 when a Dutch ship was attacked in Palembang. This provided opportunity for the company to launch a punitive expedition in 1659, in which the city was burnt to the ground.

During the Napoleonic Wars in 1812, Sultan Mahmud Badaruddin II repudiated British claims to suzerainty. The British responded by mounting a military expedition that captured Palembang and deposed the sultan. His younger brother, the pro-British Najamudinn, was installed onto the throne instead. The Dutch colonial government attempted to recover their influence at the court in 1816, but Sultan Najamuddin was uncooperative. An expedition launched by the Dutch in 1818 captured Sultan Najamudin and he was exiled to Batavia. A Dutch Army garrison was established in 1821, but Najamuddin attempted an attack and a mass poisoning of the garrison, which was intervened by the Dutch. Mahmud Badaruddin II was exiled to Ternate, and his palace was burned to the ground. The Sultanate was later abolished by the Dutch and direct colonial rule was established.

=== Dutch colonial period ===
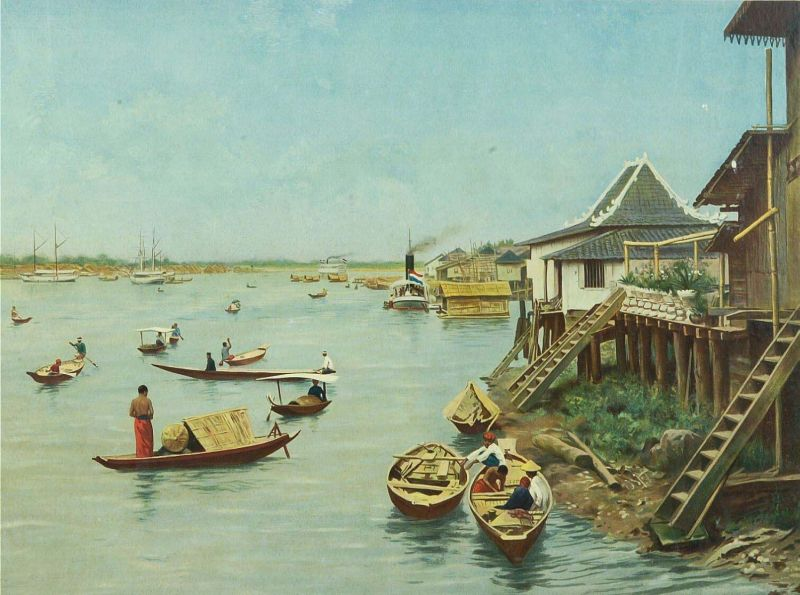
A painting of Palembang during Dutch rule

Following the Dutch abolition of the Palembang Sultanate in 1825, Palembang became the capital of the Residency of Palembang, encompassing the territory that would become the South Sumatra province after Indonesian independence. Its first resident was Jan Izaäk van Sevenhoven.

Coat of arms of Palembang during colonial era, adopted in 1925

From the late nineteenth century, with the Dutch introduction of new export crops including robusta coffee, Palembang rose as an economic centre. During the early 20th century, the development of the petroleum and rubber industries in Palembang Residency drove the city's economic growth. This saw a growth in migrants, an increase in urbanisation, and development of the socioeconomic infrastructure.In 1913, the Post and Telegraph Office opened its doors. A year later, a station was built at Kertapati on the railway line that has been constructed connecting Palembang with Telukbetung and Lahat. Many bank buildings were established in Palembang such as; Javasche Bank (1922), Nederlandsche-Handelmaatschappij Netherlands Trading Society (1937), Escomptobank (1938), Volkscrediet bank (1938). (These disappeared in the 1960s when the Ampera Bridge was built.) In 1931, the town hall with its remarkable water tower was built. Schools and hospitals followed including the modern Charitas Hospital (1938). In 1940, the first plane landed at Palembang's airport in Talang Betutu. Palembang became the most populous urban centre outside Java.

=== Japanese occupation ===
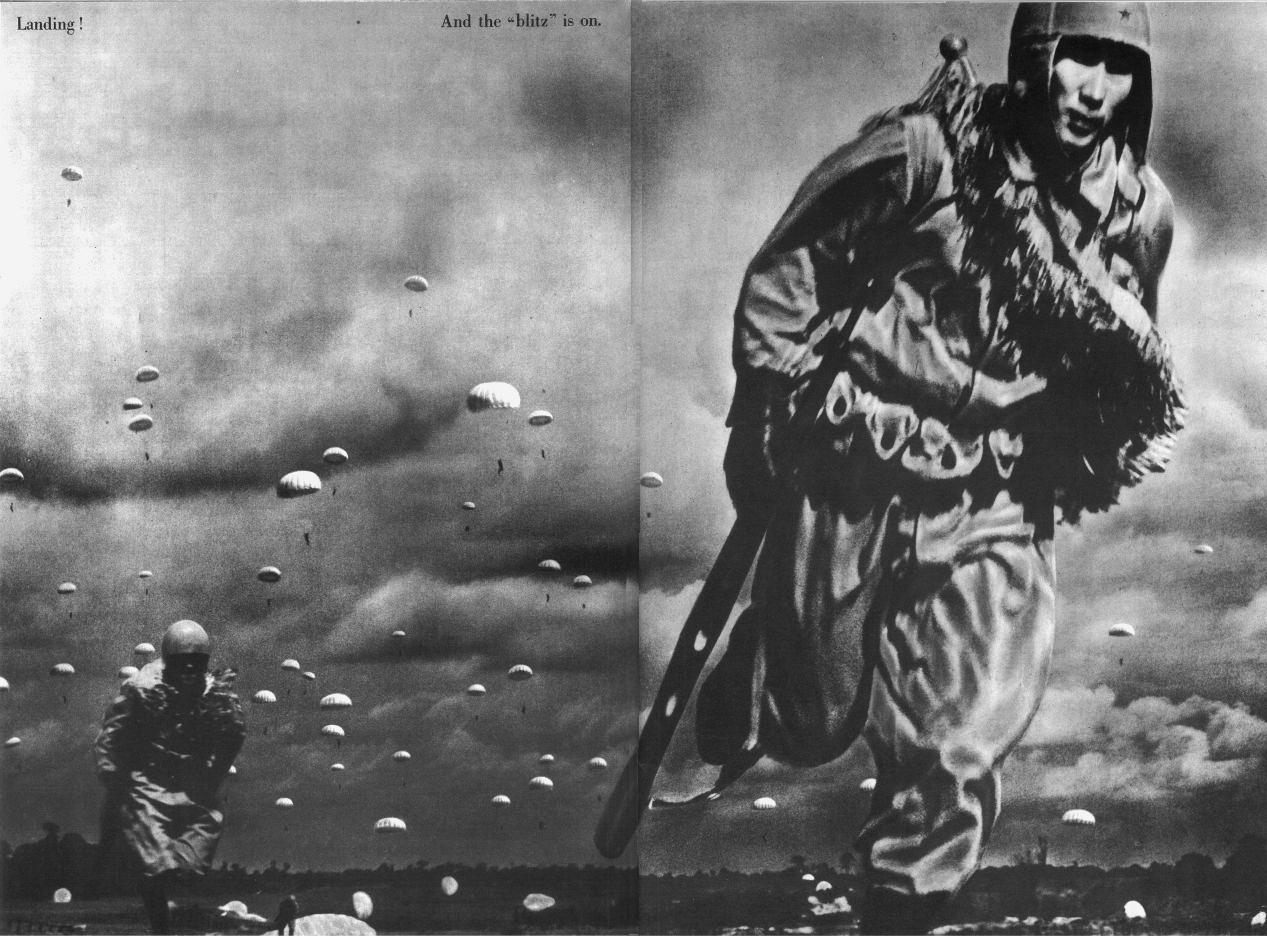
Imperial Japanese Army paratroopers landing during the battle of Palembang, 13 February 1942

An oil embargo had been imposed on Japan by the United States, the Netherlands, and the United Kingdom, and due to its oil refineries, Palembang was a high priority objective for Japanese forces. With the area's fuel supply and airfield, Palembang offered potential as a military base area, to both the Allies and the Japanese.

The main battle occurred during 13–16 February 1942. While the Allied planes were attacking Japanese shipping on 13 February, Kawasaki Ki-56 transport planes of the 1st, 2nd and 3rd Chutai, Imperial Japanese Army Air Force (IJAAF), dropped Teishin Shudan (Raiding Group) paratroopers over Pangkalan Benteng airfield. At the same time Mitsubishi Ki-21 bombers from the 98th Sentai dropped supplies for paratroopers. The formation was escorted by a large force of Nakajima Ki-43 fighters from the 59th and 64th Sentai. As many as 180 men from the Japanese 2nd Parachute Regiment, under Colonel Seiichi Kume, dropped between Palembang and Pangkalan Benteng, and more than 90 men came down west of the refineries at Plaju.

Although the Japanese paratroopers failed to capture the Pangkalan Benteng airfield, they managed to gain undamaged possession of the Plaju oil refinery. However, the second oil refinery in Sungai Gerong was demolished by the Allies. A counter-attack by Landstorm troops and anti-aircraft gunners from Prabumulih managed to retake the complex but took heavy losses. The planned demolition failed to do any serious damage to the refinery, but the oil stores were set ablaze. Two hours after the first drop, another 60 Japanese paratroopers were dropped near Pangkalan Benteng airfield.

As the Japanese landing force approached Sumatra, the remaining Allied aircraft attacked it, and the Japanese transport ship Otawa Maru was sunk. Hurricanes flew up the rivers, machine-gunning Japanese landing craft. However, on the afternoon of 15 February, all Allied aircraft were ordered to Java, where a major Japanese attack was anticipated, and the Allied air units had withdrawn from southern Sumatra by the evening of 16 February 1942. Other personnel were evacuated via Oosthaven (now Bandar Lampung) by ships to Java or India.

The Japanese managed to restore production at both main refineries, and these petroleum products were significant in their war effort. Despite Allied air raids, production was largely maintained. The city was defended from air attacks by the Imperial Japanese Army's Palembang Defense Unit.

In August 1944, USAAF B-29 bombers flying from India, raided the Palembang refineries in what was the longest range regular bombing mission of the war.

In January 1945, in Operation Meridian I and II, the British Royal Navy's Fleet Air Arm launched two major attacks on the two refinery complexes, against determined Japanese defence. The aviation fuel output was reduced by 75% for the loss of 32 aircraft to combat and landings.

=== National revolution ===
On 8 October 1945, the Resident of South Sumatra, Adnan Kapau Gani, and Gunseibu officers raised the Indonesian flag during a ceremony. It was declared that Palembang Residency was under control of Republicans.

Palembang was occupied by the Dutch after an urban battle with Republicans on 1–5 January 1947, which is nicknamed Pertempuran Lima Hari Lima Malam (Five Days and Nights Battle). The battle ended with a ceasefire and the Republican forces retreated as far as 20 kilometres (12 miles) from Palembang.

During the occupation, the Dutch formed the federal state of South Sumatra in September 1948. After the transfer of sovereignty on 27 December 1949, South Sumatra State, along with other federal states and the Republic formed a short-lived United States of Indonesia before the states were abolished and integrated back into the form of Republic on 17 August 1950.

=== Old Order and New Order period ===
During PRRI/Permesta rebellion, the rebel faction established Dewan Garuda (Garuda Council) in South Sumatra on 15 January 1957 under Lieutenant Colonel Barlian took over the local government of South Sumatra.

In April 1962, Indonesian government started the construction of Ampera Bridge which was completed and officially opened for public on 30 September 1965 by Minister/Commander of the Army Lieutenant General Ahmad Yani on 30 September 1965, only hours before he was killed by troops belonging to the 30 September Movement. At first, the bridge was known as the Bung Karno Bridge, after the president, but following his fall, it was renamed the Ampera Bridge. A second bridge in Palembang which crosses Musi River, Musi II Bridge was built on 4 August 1992.

On 6 December 1988, Indonesia government expanded Palembang's administrative area as far as 12 kilometers from the city center, with nine villages from Musi Banyuasin integrated into two new districts of Palembang and one village from Ogan Komering Ilir integrated into Seberang Ulu I District.

During May 1998 riots of Indonesia, Palembang was also ravaged by riots with 10 burned shops, more than a dozen burned cars, and several injured people inflicted by rioters as students marching to the Provincial People's Representative Council office of South Sumatra. Thousands of police and soldiers were put on guard at various points in the city. The Volunteer Team for Humanity (Indonesian: Tim Relawan untuk Manusia, or TRUK) reported that cases of sexual assault also took place.

=== Reform period ===
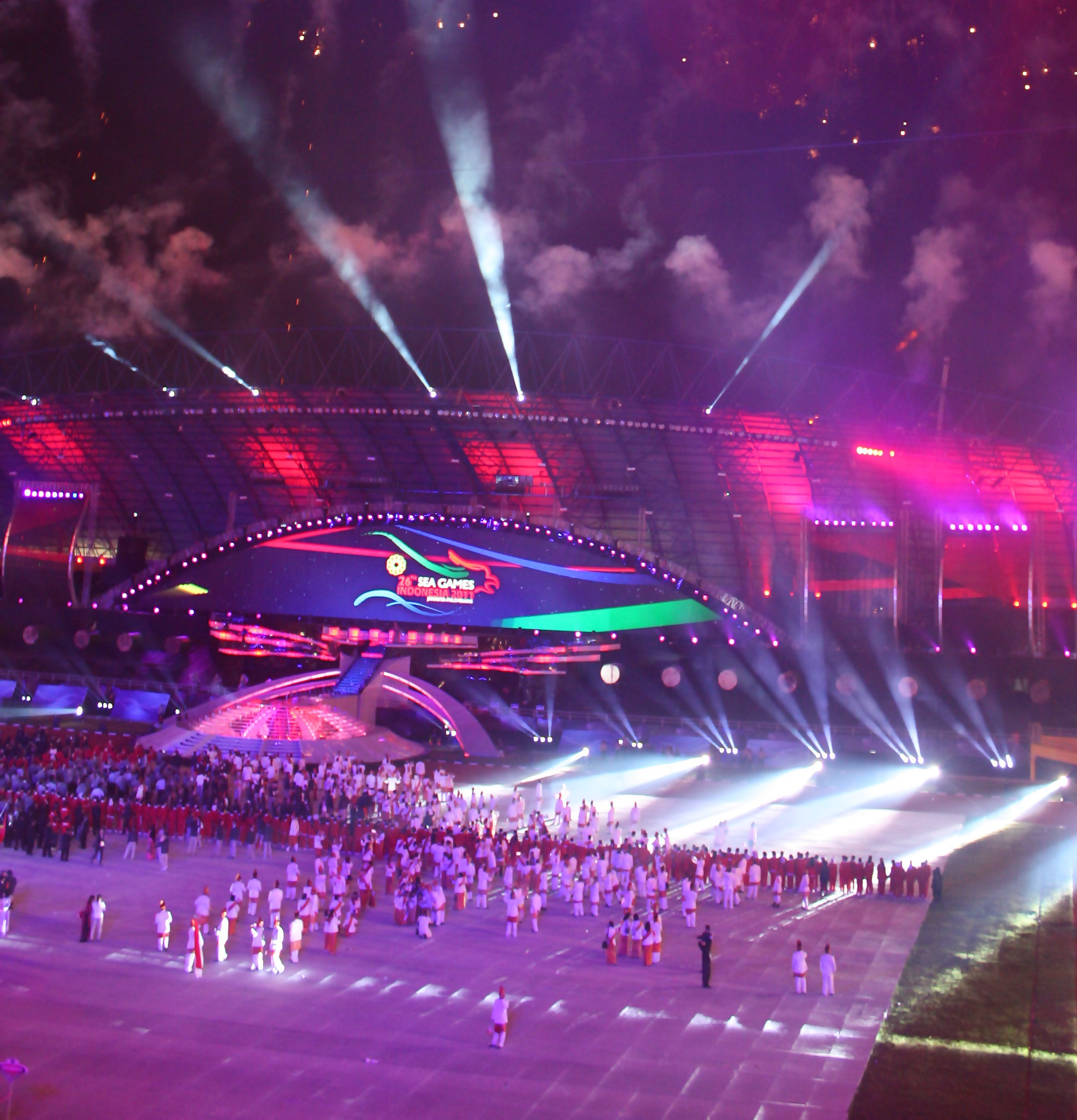
The opening ceremony of the 2011 Southeast Asian Games in Jakabaring Stadium, Palembang, 11 November 2011

A sports complex, including Gelora Sriwijaya Stadium, was built in Palembang's southern district of Jakabaring over 1998-2004. Palembang then hosted the 2004 National Games, 47 years after the games were last held outside Java and 51 years since held in Sumatra. Palembang went on to co-host the 2011 Southeast Asian Games with Jakarta. Two years later, Palembang replaced Riau province's capital Pekanbaru as host city of the 2013 Islamic Solidarity Games after Riau Governor Rusli Zainal was implicated in a corruption case. Palembang and Jakarta co-hosted the 2018 Asian Games.

President Susilo Bambang Yudhoyono in 2005 declared Palembang a "Water Tourism City". Further tourism promotions were launched by Yudhoyono's administration in 2008 amid criticism that souvenirs promoting local culture for the campaign were actually imported from China.

Palembang's first flyover was completed at Simpang Polda in September 2008. A second flyover, in Jakabaring, was completed in 2015 and a third flyover was completed in 2024 at Sekip Ujung. In 2010, Palembang launched its bus transit system, Transmusi. In 2015, the central government began upgrading Palembang's transportation with the construction of a light rail transit system from Sultan Mahmud Badaruddin II International Airport to Jakabaring, followed by toll roads, two Musi River bridges, and two flyovers, ahead of the 2018 Asian Games. The city's main toll road commenced operation in October 2017.

== Geography and climate ==
=== Geography ===
At 2°59′10″S 104°45′20″E, Palembang occupies 400.61 km^{2} of vast lowland area east of Bukit Barisan Mountains in southern Sumatra with average elevation of 8 metres (26 feet), approximately 105 kilometres (65 miles) from nearby coast at Bangka Strait. One of the largest rivers in Sumatra, the Musi River, runs through the city, dividing the city area into two major parts which are Seberang Ilir in the north (comprising 13 of the 18 city districts) and Seberang Ulu in the south (comprising Seberang Ulu Satu, Kertapati, Jakabaring, Seberang Ulu Dua and Plaju Districts). Palembang is also located on the confluence of two major tributaries of Musi River, which are Ogan River and Komering River. The river's water level is influenced by tidal cycle. In rainy season, many areas on the city are inundated by the river's tide.

Palembang's topography is quite different between the Seberang Ilir and Seberang Ulu areas. Seberang Ulu's topography is relatively flat. Seberang Ilir's topography is more rugged with altitude variation between 4 and 20 metres (13 and 66 feet).

=== Climate ===
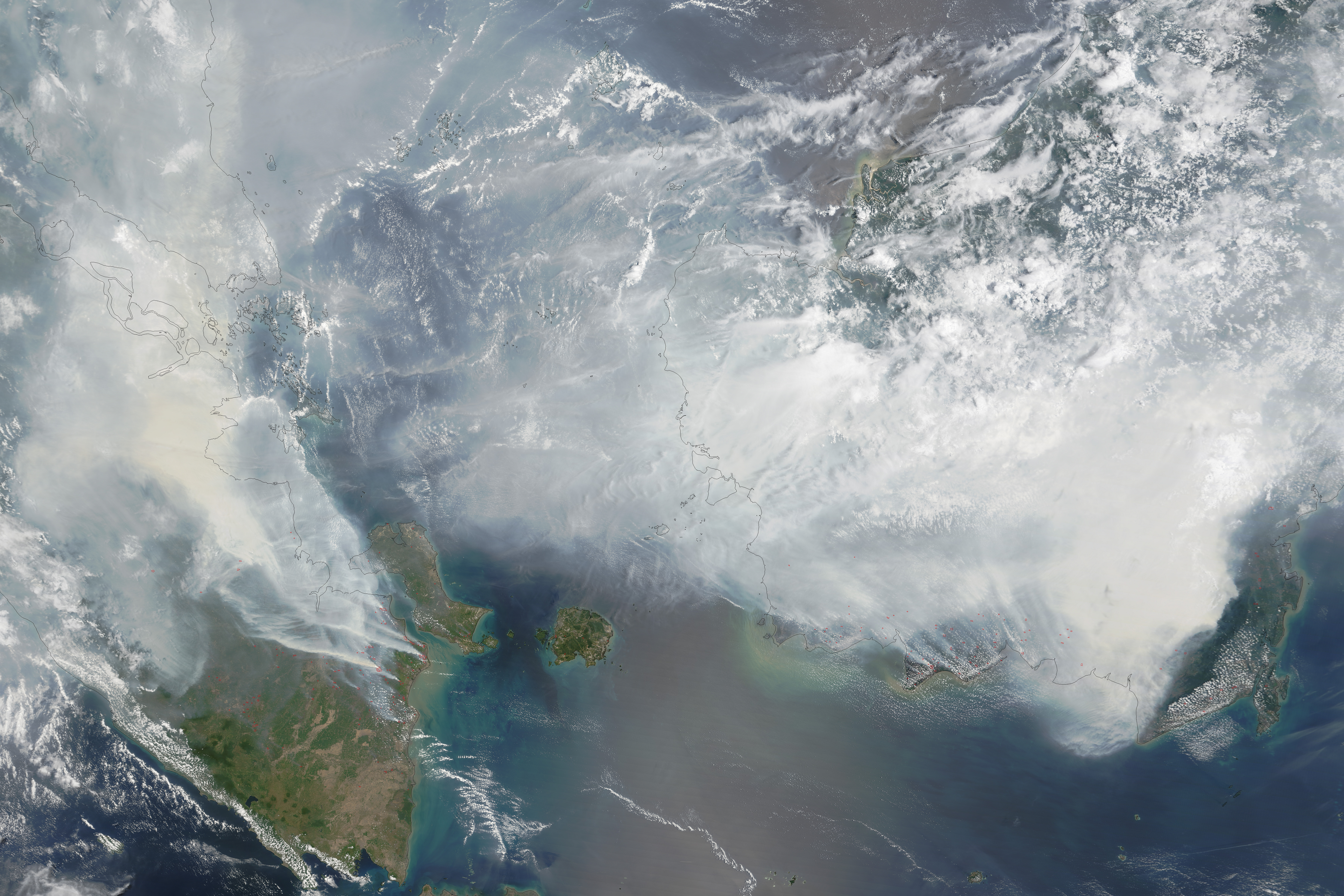
A NASA satellite image showing the extent of the haze on 24 September 2015. Palembang was directly affected by the haze during this time, disrupting air travels and worsening the health of its residents.

Palembang is located in the tropical rainforest climate (Köppen Af) zone with significant rainfall even in its driest months. The climate in Palembang is often described as a "hot, humid climate with a lot of rainfall throughout the year". The annual average temperature is around 27.3 °C (81.1 °F). Within this tropical climate, except for precipitation and monsoonal wind direction, the city experiences no other seasonal change throughout the year. Average rainfall annually is 2,623 millimetres or 103 inches. During its wettest months, the city's lowlands are frequently inundated by torrential rains. However, in its driest months, many peatlands around the city dried, making them more vulnerable to wildfires, causing prolonged haze in the city. Due to the city's very low latitude, the typhoon risk of the city is nearly absent.

Climate data for Palembang (Sultan Mahmud Badaruddin II International Airport) (1991–2020 normals)
Month	Jan	Feb	Mar	Apr	May	Jun	Jul	Aug	Sep	Oct	Nov	Dec	Year
Mean daily maximum °C (°F)	30.9 (87.6)	31.4 (88.5)	32.1 (89.8)	32.5 (90.5)	32.6 (90.7)	32.3 (90.1)	32.2 (90.0)	32.8 (91.0)	33.2 (91.8)	33.0 (91.4)	32.3 (90.1)	31.3 (88.3)	32.2 (90.0)
Daily mean °C (°F)	26.5 (79.7)	26.5 (79.7)	26.9 (80.4)	27.2 (81.0)	27.5 (81.5)	27.3 (81.1)	27 (81)	27.2 (81.0)	27.3 (81.1)	27.3 (81.1)	27.1 (80.8)	26.7 (80.1)	27.0 (80.6)
Mean daily minimum °C (°F)	23.4 (74.1)	23.4 (74.1)	23.4 (74.1)	23.7 (74.7)	24.2 (75.6)	23.7 (74.7)	23.2 (73.8)	23.0 (73.4)	23.0 (73.4)	23.2 (73.8)	23.5 (74.3)	23.4 (74.1)	23.4 (74.1)
Average precipitation mm (inches)	267.2 (10.52)	245.8 (9.68)	350.0 (13.78)	300.2 (11.82)	174.3 (6.86)	148.3 (5.84)	107.6 (4.24)	80.5 (3.17)	100.0 (3.94)	224.4 (8.83)	316.9 (12.48)	345.4 (13.60)	2,660.6 (104.75)
Average precipitation days (≥ 1.0 mm)	18.7	14.5	17.7	17.2	12.1	9.5	9.2	7.6	8.0	13.2	16.8	18.8	163.3
Mean monthly sunshine hours	110.1	113.4	133.2	150.7	162.2	152.1	172.1	179.9	151.1	135.0	124.8	105.8	1,690.4
Source: World Meteorological Organization

=== Neighborhoods ===
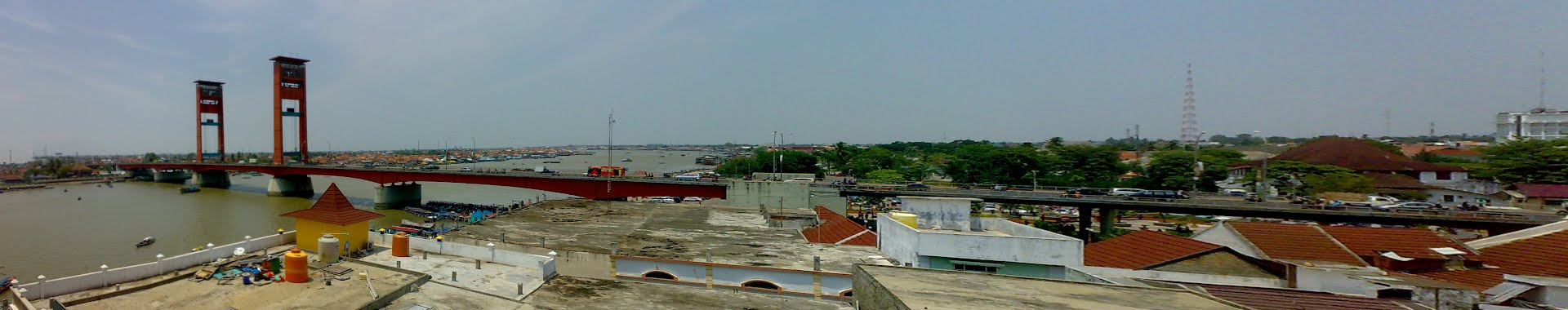
Panorama of Palembang from southeast to southwest as seen from Pasar 16 Ilir

Palembang is roughly divided by Musi River into two major areas known as Seberang Ilir (lit. 'downstream bank') in the north and Seberang Ulu (lit. 'upstream bank') in the south. Seberang Ilir is the main economic and political centre in Palembang and contained a prominent portion of the city's highrises. Seberang Ulu is undergoing massive development, especially in Jakabaring, with the construction of business centre, government building, and the most notably is the construction of the city's sport complex, Jakabaring Sport City.

== Administration ==
=== Government ===
Palembang administratively has a status as a city and has its own local government and legislative body. The executive head of Palembang is the Mayor. The mayor and representatives are locally elected by popular vote for a five-year term. The city government enjoys greater decentralization of affairs than the provincial body, such as the provision of public schools, public health facilities and public transportation. Current Mayor of the city is Ratu Dewa. Previously, it was Harnojoyo, who was appointed in 2015 because the previous mayor, Romi Herton was impeached because of a bribery scandal during his election. Besides Mayor and Vice Mayor, there is the Palembang City Regional House of Representatives, which is a legislative body of 50 council members directly elected by the people in legislative elections every five years.

=== Administrative districts ===
Palembang consists of 18 kecamatan (districts), each headed by a Camat. They are further divided again into 107 kelurahan (urban villages). They are listed below with their areas, their populations at the 2010 and 2020 Censuses, and the official estimates as at mid 2025. The table also includes the numbers of kelurahan (urban villages) in each district, and its postal codes.

Palembang's Districts (Kecamatan)
Kode Wilayah	Name of District (kecamatan)	Area in km^{2}	Pop'n census 2010	Pop'n census 2020	Pop'n estimate mid 2025	Density (per km^{2}) in 2025	No. of kelurahan	Postal codes
16.71.01	Ilir Barat Dua	4.18	63,959	67,614	70,278	16,812.9	7	30141 - 30146
16.71.12	Gandus	49.64	57,221	73,953	86,989	1,752.4	5	30147 - 30149
16.71.02	Seberang Ulu Satu	6.08	162,744	91,166	97,535	16,041.9	6	30258 - 30259
16.71.13	Kertapati	41.09	80,226	91,661	100,923	2,456.1	5	30251 - 30257
16.71.17	Jakabaring	11.72	^{(a)}	90,415	95,454	8,144.5	5	30251 - 30257
16.71.03	Seberang Ulu Dua	8.35	92,276	100,232	107,801	12,910.3	7	30261 - 30267
16.71.14	Plaju	16.52	79,096	93,171	100,684	6,094.7	7	30266 - 30268
16.71.04	Ilir Barat Satu	40.15	124,657	140,945	157,560	3,924.3	6	30131 - 30134
16.71.11	Bukit Kecil	2.38	43,811	38,585	38,092	16,005.0	6	30135 - 30136
16.71.05	Ilir Timur Satu	5.18	69,406	66,168	65,828	12,708.1	11	30121 - 30124
16.71.09	Kemuning	6.51	82,661	80,685	82,225	12,630.6	6	30127 - 30128
16.71.06	Ilir Timur Dua	8.44	159,152	85,460	84,509	10,012.9	6	30111 - 30118
16.71.10	Kalidoni	32.97	99,738	122,474	135,373	4,105.9	5	30114 - 30119
16.71.18	Ilir Timur Tiga	7.84	^{(a)}	73,010	74,481	9,500.1	6	30111 - 30114
16.71.08	Sako	17.19	82,661	110,079	119,302	6,940.2	4	30161 - 30164
16.71.16	Sematang Borang	25.85	32,207	54,362	74,577	2,885.0	4	30161 - 30165
16.71.07	Sukarami	40.08	139,098	183,667	218,538	5,452.5	7	30151 - 30155
16.71.15	Alang-Alang Lebar	24.17	86,371	105,201	119,596	4,948.1	4	30151 - 30154
16.71	Totals	348.34	1,455,284	1,668,848	1,829,745	5,252.8	107	

Note: (a) Two additional districts - Ilir Timur Tiga (East Ilir III) and Jakabaring - were established in 2017 by splitting from Ilir Timur Dua (East Ilir II) and Seberang Ulu Satu (Upper Seberang I) districts respectively; their populations at the 2010 Census are included in the figures given for the districts from which they were cut out.

Note the affixes can be translated as: "Satu" = "One"; "Dua" = "Two"; "Tiga" = "Three"; "Timur" = "East"; "Barat" = "West"; "Ilir" = "Lower" (or "Downriver"); "Ulu" - "Upper" (or "Upriver").

== Demography ==
Palembang is an ethnically diverse city. The indigenous population in the region of Palembang are Palembang people. Many of them live in traditional settlements along the Musi River bank, although there has been a recent efflux of Palembang people to the outer suburbs. Many people of other ethnicities from other parts of South Sumatra and beyond also live in Palembang. There are also significant Javanese, Minangkabau, Arab, Indian and Chinese communities who are inhabitants of Palembang. Arab Indonesian communities mainly live in several villages such as Kampong Al Munawwar in 13 Ulu, Kampong Assegaf in 16 Ulu, Kampong Al Habsyi in Kuto Batu, Kampong Jamalullail in 19 Ilir and Kampong Alawiyyin in Sungai Bayas, 10 Ilir. Conversely, Chinese Indonesian communities mainly live in commercial districts in Palembang although there are several traditional Chinese villages like Kampong Kapitan in 7 Ulu. And Indian in 18 Ilir.

The locally widespread Palembang language (baso Pelembang) is considered a Malayic variety in the Musi cluster with a significant Javanese influence. The natives originating from other parts of South Sumatra have their own regional languages, such as the Musi (Sekayu, Kelingi, Penukal dialects), Rawas, Penesak, and Pegagan varieties of the Musi cluster; the South Barisan Malayic varieties of Besemah, Lintang, Ogan, and Semende; and the Lampungic variety of Komering. Chinese languages are also largely used by local Chinese communities.

=== Religion ===
Religion in Palembang (2023)
religion	percent
Islam	93.02%
Buddhism	3.24%
Christianity	3.18%
Hinduism	0.04%
Confucianism	0.01%

Palembang officially recognizes six religious faiths, of which the most widely held is Islam. According to the 2023 data from Badan Pusat Statistik Palembang, the population of Palembang was 93.21% Islam, followed by Buddhist (3.24%). Smaller religious communities included Christianity, Hindu, and Confucianism. Islam in Palembang are mainly from the Shafi`i school of Sunni Islam. There are several mosques with considerable heritage and historical significance, chiefly the Great Mosque of Palembang, which was built during the Palembang Sultanate era, widely regarded as the main mosque of Palembang.

== Transportation ==
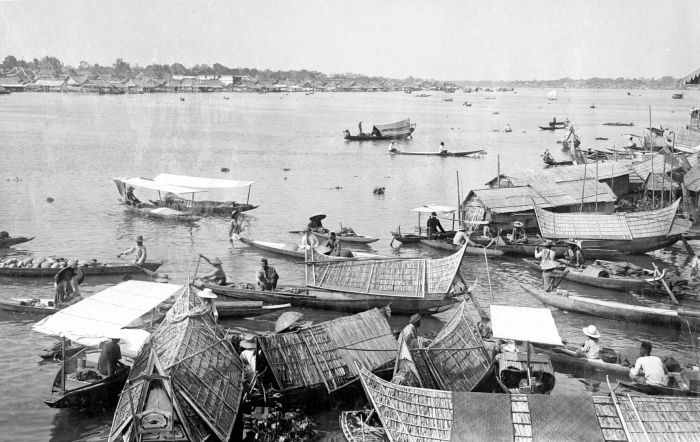
Kajang boats were widely used for transportation in Musi River during colonial times.

Before the operation of Ampera Bridge, there were more people in Palembang using water transportation. Large water vehicles such as river steamboat was used to transport people to and from inland. Some people also used smaller boats such as the Kajang boat, a traditional boat with simple roof to carry people and goods. Nowadays, people in Palembang prefer road transportation over water, and private transportation over public. Traffic jams often occur in some main streets, especially during rush hour. Rail and air transportation are also available in Palembang.

=== Road ===
==== Toll road ====
Since 2020, Palembang has been connected with the Trans-Sumatra Toll Road, linking it with Bakauheni to the south. As of 2022, the northwards road terminates at Palembang, although planning and construction for the road's extension to Jambi is ongoing.

==== Public Bus and Taxibus ====
Palembang operates several bus and taxibus (angkot) routes. The first angkots in Palembang were using Willys Jeep and was called "Mobil Ketek" because of its engine sound. Public buses were introduced in the 1990s and served some routes from Seberang Ilir neighborhoods such as Km.12, Perumnas, Pusri, and Bukit Besar to Seberang Ulu neighborhoods which are Kertapati, Plaju, and Jakabaring. Due to aging vehicles, poor security and drivers habit, all non air-conditioned public buses are ordered to cease their services inside Palembang in 2018.

Currently, much of public bus services in Palembang is provided by Teman Bus since 2020 since previous public bus service operator in Palembang named Transmusi which had been introduced in 2010 stop its service. Teman Bus is running four routes (corridors) inside the city.

- Corridor K1P : Alang-alang Lebar Bus Terminal - Ampera Bridge
- Corridor K2P : Sako Bus Terminal - Palembang Icon Mall
- Corridor K3P : Palembang Icon Mall - Plaju Bus Terminal
- Corridor K4P : Alang-alang Lebar Bus Terminal - Talang Jambe

Teman Bus is also operating seven air-conditioned taxibus (angkot) routes as feeder to already established Palembang LRT service.

- Corridor K1FP : Talang Kelapa – Asrama Haji Station - Talang Buruk
- Corridor K2FP : Asrama Haji Station - Sematang Borang
- Corridor K3FP : Asrama Haji Station - Talang Betutu
- Corridor K4FP : Polresta Station - Perumahan OPI
- Corridor K5FP : DJKA Station - Tegal Binangun - Plaju Bus Terminal
- Corridor K6FP : Siti Fatimah Hospital Station - Sukawinatan
- Corridor K7FP : Bukit Besar- Bumi Sriwijaya Station - Kamboja Stadium

Another public bus operator, DAMRI also operates air-conditioned public bus routes to neighboring towns such as Kayuagung, Indralaya, Pangkalan Balai, Prabumulih, and Tanjung Api-Api.

==== Taxicab ====
Palembang also has a large number of taxis. The number has been rising since the National Games 2004 and SEA Games 2011, which both were held in Palembang.

==== Becak and ojek ====
There are many becak (pedicabs) and ojek (motorcycle taxi) operated in Palembang. Becak are often found in more older settlements along Musi River than ojek which are mostly found in more recent settlements far from the river.

==== App-based taxi and ojek ====
Taxis and ojeks are available via Go-Jek and Grab. Because of protests from taxi drivers, angkot and ojek are often barred from taking passengers to/from some places, such as the airport.

=== Rail ===
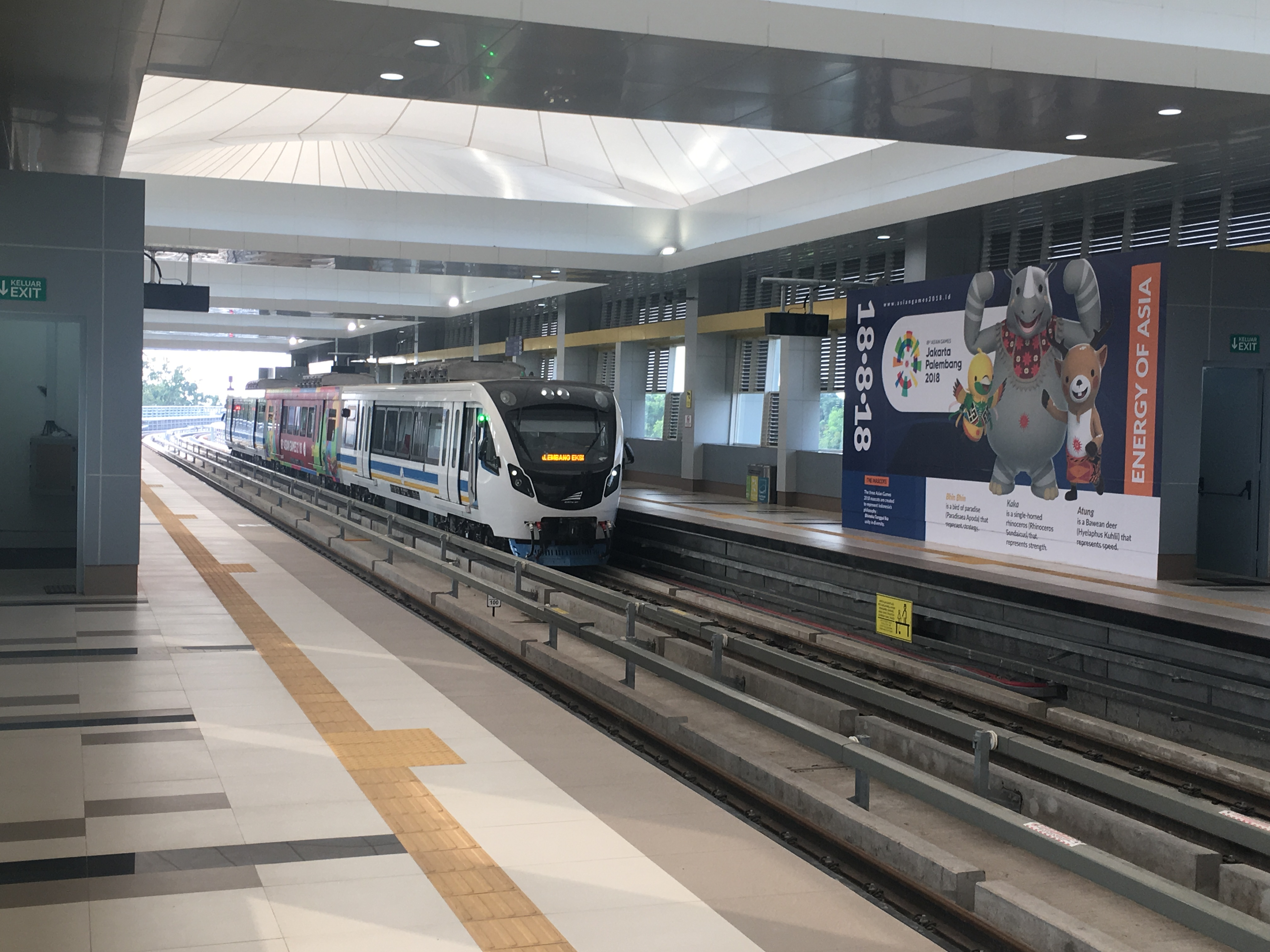
Sultan Mahmud Badaruddin II International Airport station of the Palembang Light Rail Transit

Railway tracks were introduced by the Dutch in the late 1800s. Railway tracks connect Palembang to provinces in southern Sumatra such as Bandar Lampung in Lampung Province, Rejang Lebong Regency in Bengkulu Province, and some main towns in South Sumatra such as Lubuklinggau, Prabumulih, Indralaya, Muara Enim, Lahat, Tebing Tinggi, Baturaja, and Martapura. The largest railway station in Palembang is Kertapati Station. There are plans to connect Palembang to other cities in Sumatra, ultimately connected existing railways in northern, western and southern Sumatra, forming Trans Sumatra Railway.

With the opening of Palembang LRT on 1 August 2018, Palembang was the first Indonesian city to have a light rail system (and rapid transit system in general), predating the opening of Jakarta LRT in 2019. There are 13 stations along the 23.4-kilometre (14.5 mi) LRT system, connecting Sultan Mahmud Badaruddin II International Airport and Jakabaring Sport City.

=== Water ===
==== River transport ====
Palembang has several types of river transportation. The most traditional one is a motorboat called "perahu ketek", a wooden boat which using small engine and moves quite slow. Perahu ketek is often used especially by people who live on riverside to cross the river from one bank to another. Another type of river transportation is called "speedboat", a wooden motorboat which using more larger engine and designed to withstand the speed of the boat itself, far more faster than perahu ketek. Speedboats often used by the people outside Palembang, especially who lives in Musi River delta, to go to and from Palembang. Palembang also operates some larger riverboat for tourism activities.

==== Port ====
Currently Palembang also has two main ferry ports, Tanjung Api-api Port, located on sea-shore, 68 kilometres (42 miles) outside the city, and Boom Baru Port inside the city. These ports operate ferries to Bangka, Belitung and Batam Island. There is a plan to build deep sea port in Tanjung Api-Api.

=== Air ===
The only public airport in Palembang is Sultan Mahmud Badaruddin II International Airport. This airport provides domestic routes that connect Palembang with many cities in Indonesia, especially Jakarta, but also other towns in South Sumatra, such as Lubuklinggau and Pagaralam. It also has international routes to Singapore and Kuala Lumpur.

== Economy ==
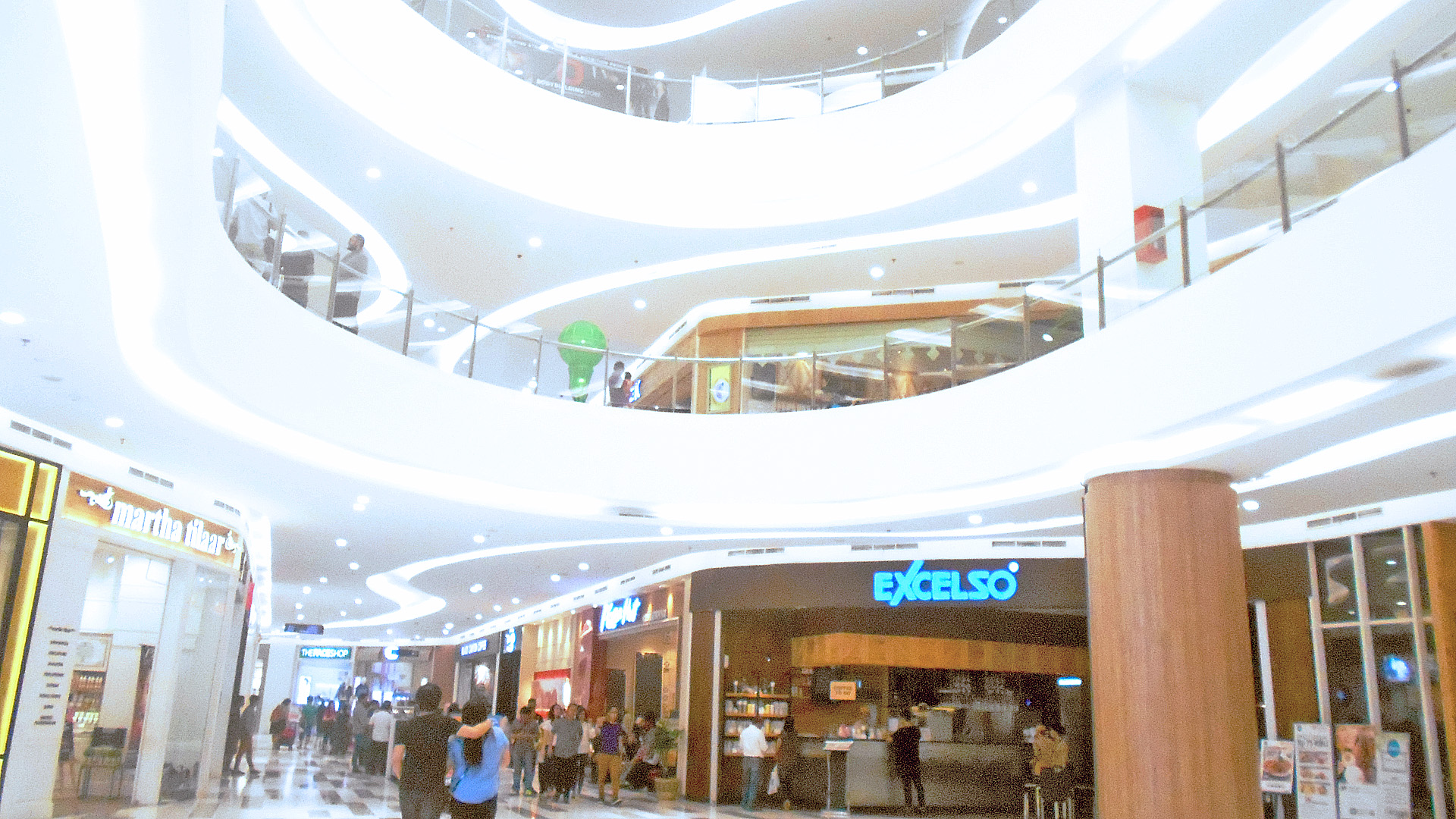
View of central area in Palembang Icon Shopping Mall

As the capital of South Sumatra and one of major cities in Indonesia, Palembang's economy depends highly on trading, service, transportation, manufacturing and construction sectors. GRDP of Palembang was Rp 118.77 trillion (US$9.01 billion) in 2016. Of this, the manufacturing and construction sectors take up the largest portions with 33.17 and 18.21 percent contributions, respectively. The minimum wage for 2017 is Rp 2,484,000 per month, somewhat higher than regencies in Java although lower than that of cities such as Medan or Surabaya.

Palembang is a part of Strategic Development Area of Merak - Bakauheni - Bandar Lampung - Palembang - Tanjung Api-Api (MBBPT). To accelerate the region development, Trans-Sumatra Toll Road is being constructed to eventually give Palembang a high-speed highway access to other cities in Sumatra, including Bengkulu in the west, Jambi in the north, and Bandar Lampung in the south.

=== Business and industry ===
Palembang is the regional business centre in southern Sumatra region encompassing Jambi, South Sumatra, Bengkulu, Bangka Belitung Islands and Lampung. Several main factories and industries in Indonesia are operating in Palembang such as fertiliser factory of Pupuk Sriwidjaja Palembang in Sei Selayur, portland cement factory of Baturaja Portland Cement in Kertapati and oil and gas refinery of Pertamina in Plaju. Several coal mining industries in South Sumatra also transport coal to the city by freight trains and by trucks before being shipped to Java or abroad.

In Indonesia, South Sumatra is the largest producer of rubber, estimated at over 940,000 tons of production in 2016, and over 850,000 tons of rubber were exported from Palembang in the same year. In 2014, there were 14 rubber processing factories in the city employing 4,000 people with a capacity of close to a million tons annually. There is however no specified industrial parks in the city.

At least 10,683 foreign tourists and 1,896,110 domestic tourists visited the city in 2016. Several hotels are operating in Palembang, many of them are opened after the 2004 Pekan Olahraga Nasional. Culinary business in Palembang is also developing. A ton of pempek is exported from Palembang to other cities in Indonesia and abroad daily.

=== Markets and commercial centres ===
Generally, there are two types of markets in Palembang, traditional market and modern market. From 30 traditional markets in Palembang, majority of traditional markets in Palembang is managed by PD Pasar Palembang Jaya. The rest is owned by private or cooperative. Being in the central area of Palembang, 16 Ilir Market is the main traditional market in the city, while the area around the market, especially areas along Jalan Masjid Lama, Jalan Jendral Soedirman, Jalan Kolonel Atmo and Jalan Letkol Iskandar become bustling commercial centres integrated with one another. Another notable trading centre in Palembang is Cinde Market, one of the oldest market in Indonesia which was built first in 1957 with its unique mushroom pillars, then razed in 2017 to be replaced with more modern building.

Other modern commercial centers and malls are built in other parts of the city. Most of them are built in along Sekanak River corridor, including Palembang Indah Mall, Ramayana Palembang, Transmart Palembang, Palembang Icon, and Palembang Square, other notable malls such as Palembang Trade Center and OPI Mall are built in Patal Pusri and Jakabaring respectively. Two of main Indonesia retail giants, Indomaret and Alfamart also open their franchise stores in every part of the city.

== Sultan Mahmud Badaruddin II Museum ==
From the 1930s onward the Palembang municipal Sultan Mahmud Badaruddin II Museum started to house archaeological objects from regional sites that had not yet been excavated. The curator of the Batavian Museum in Jakarta only allowed for few historic stones to be transported. The carved megalith Air Poear represents Pasemah culture in the collection of the Jakarta History Museum.

== Tourism ==
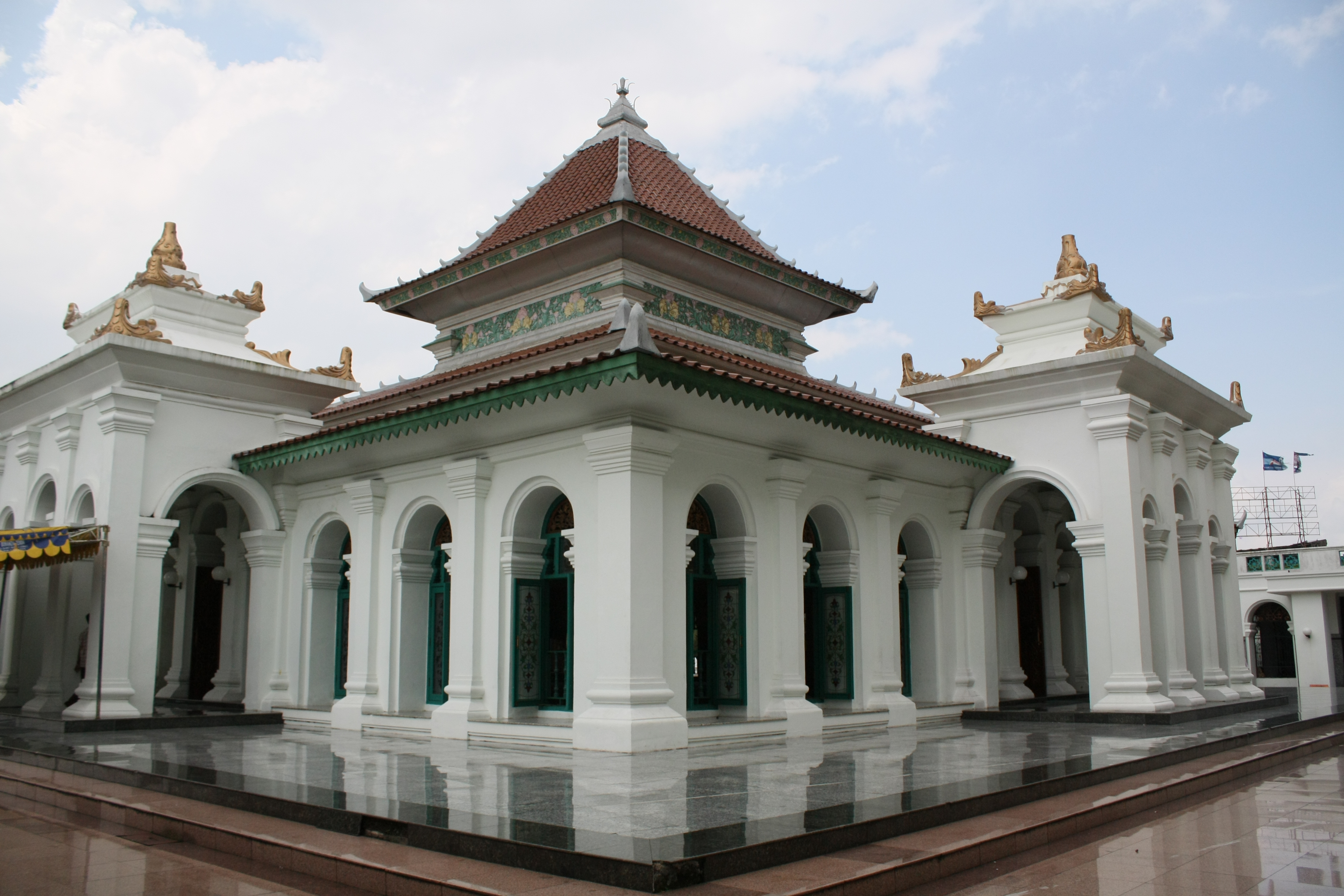
Great Mosque of Palembang

Palembang is known as Venetië Van Andalas (Venice of Sumatra), mainly because of the topography of the city which was dominated by Musi River and its tributaries.

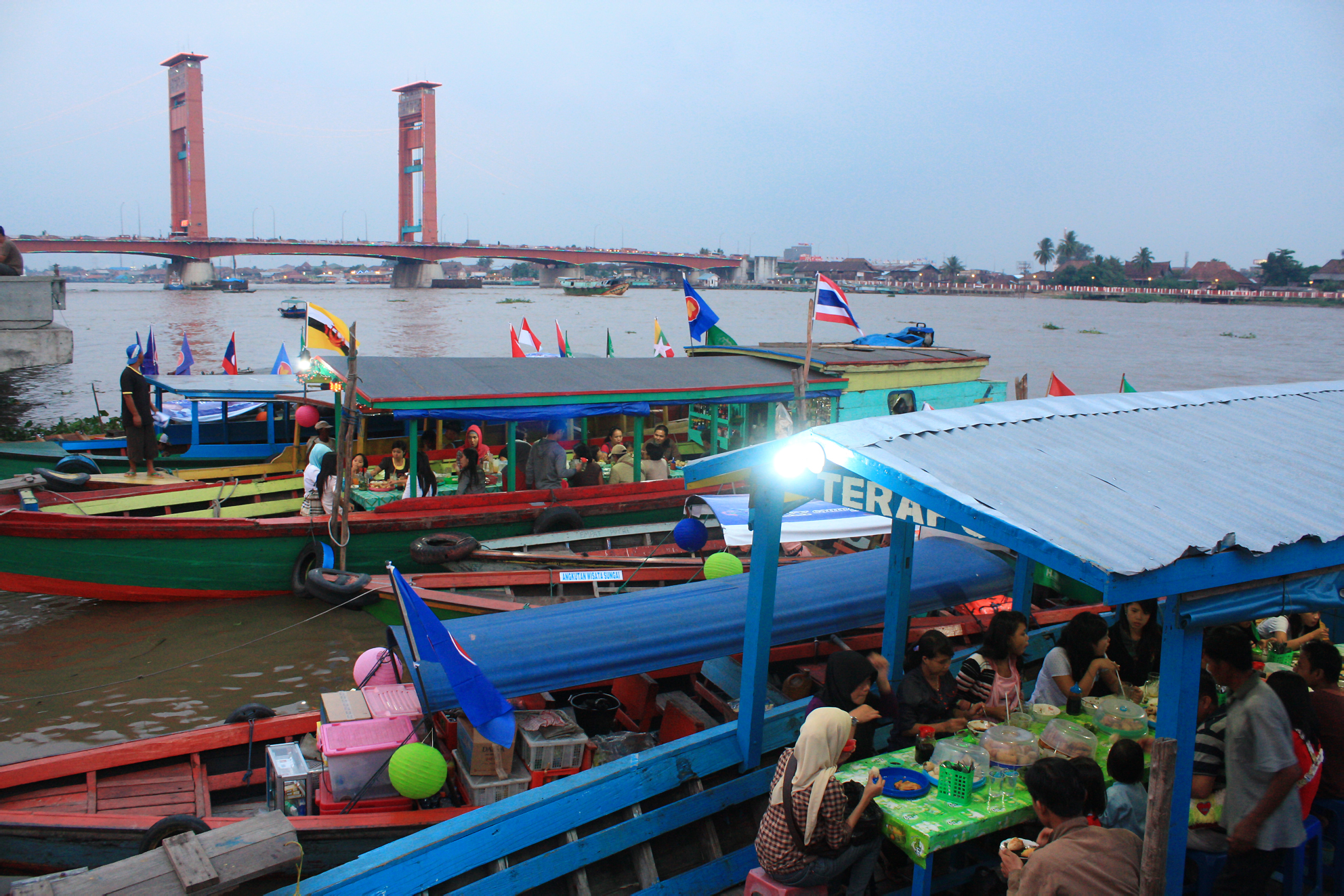
People enjoying local dishes on floating warung boats

As a trading city since antiquity, Palembang is very heterogenous and its local culture and language is also influenced by many civilizations, most notably Chinese, Javanese, and Arabs. Several Dutch legacies in architecture can also be seen in the city. The most notable landmarks in Palembang are Ampera Bridge, Musi River, Kuto Besak Fort, Kemaro Island, and Jakabaring Sport City.

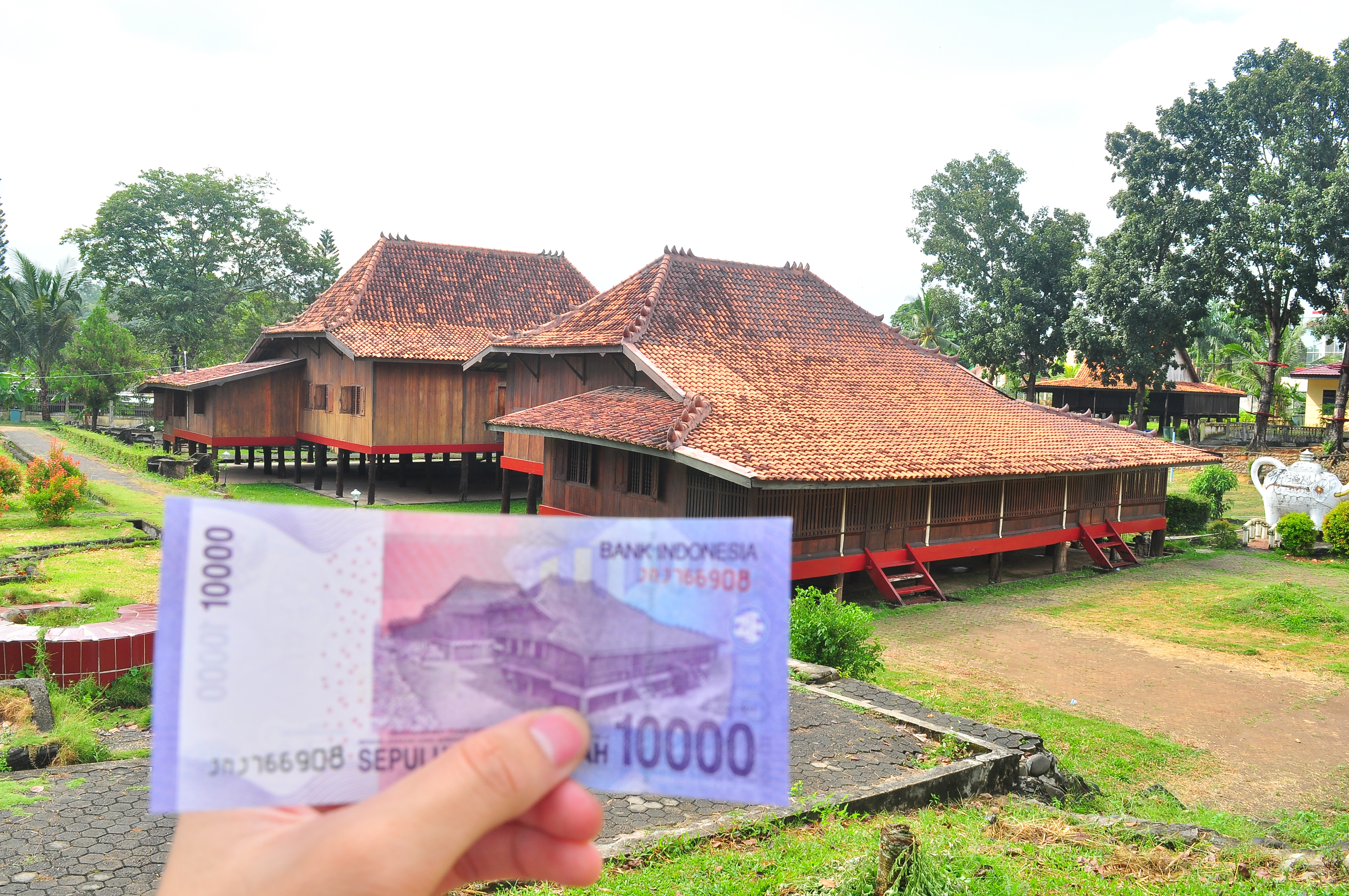
Rumah Limas of IDR 10000 banknote is now located in Museum Balaputradewa, Palembang

=== Landmarks and sights ===
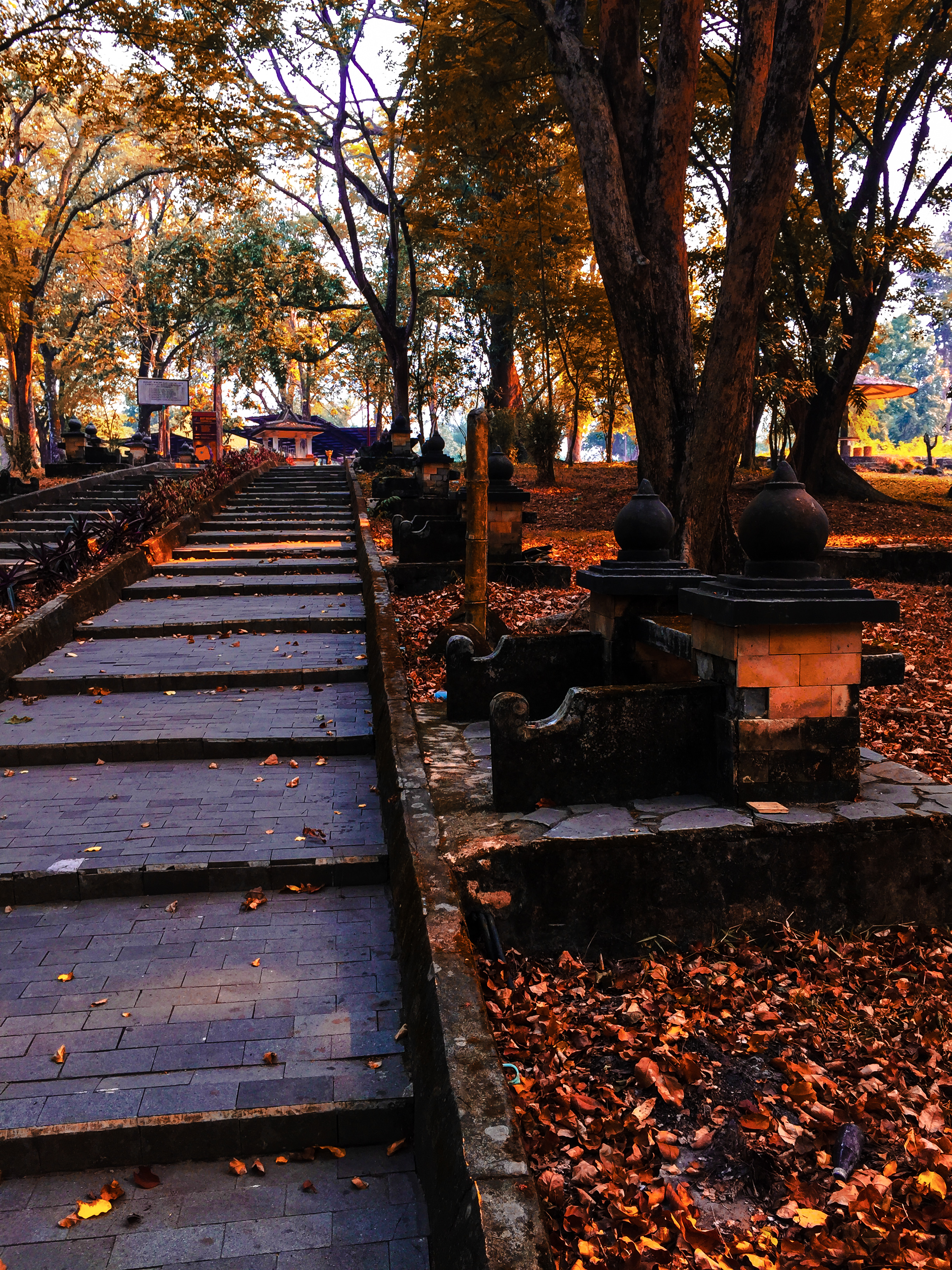
Bukit Siguntang Mahameru (Seguntang Hill), Palembang. Based on the Sejarah Melayu (Malay Annals), the hill witnessed the arrival of Sri Maharaja Sang Sapurba Paduka Sri Trimurti Tri Buana, a legendary figure believed to be the progenitor of many royal Malay dynasties in Sumatra, Malay Peninsula and Borneo.

- Musi River, 750 kilometres (470 miles) long river which divides Palembang into two parts, which are Seberang Ulu and Seberang Ilir. It is one of the longest rivers in Sumatra. Since antiquity, the Musi River has become the heart of Palembang and South Sumatra's economy. There are some landmarks along its bank, such as Ampera Bridge, Kuto Besak Fort, Sultan Mahmud Badaruddin II Museum, Kemaro Island, 16 Ilir Market, traditional raft houses, Pertamina's oil refineries, Pupuk Sriwijaya (PUSRI) fertiliser plants, Bagus Kuning Park, Musi II Bridge, Kampong Al Munawar, etc.
- Ampera Bridge, main city landmark, is a bridge crossed over 1,177 metres (3,862 feet) above the Musi River which connects Seberang Ulu and Seberang Ilir area of Palembang.
- Great Mosque of Palembang, also known as the Sultan Mahmud Badaruddin II Mosque, is the main mosque of Palembang located in the city centre. This mosque is built as the royal mosque of Palembang Sultanate and had undergone several renovations during Sultanate, Dutch, and Republic rule.
- Kuto Besak Fort, located on the northern bank of the Musi River adjacent to Ampera Bridge and opposite to kampong Kapitan. The fort is built by Sultanate of Palembang, one of few surviving forts built by the local and not named after any European. Tourists are only allowed to see the fort from the outside as this fort is still owned by Tentara Nasional Indonesia, specifically the Health Department of Military Area Command II/Sriwijaya (Kesehatan Daerah Militer II/Sriwijaya) and has a function as a military hospital.
- Kemaro Island, a small delta island of Musi River, located in eastern Palembang. This island houses several Chinese heritages in Palembang which are Kemaro Island Pagoda and Hok Tjiang Rio temple (福正廟). This island becomes more crowded during Chinese festivals specifically during Cap Go Meh on the final day of Chinese New Year celebrations. In front of the temple, there is a tomb which is believed to be a tomb of a legendary couple of Tan Bun An and Siti Fatimah who made this island during their death.

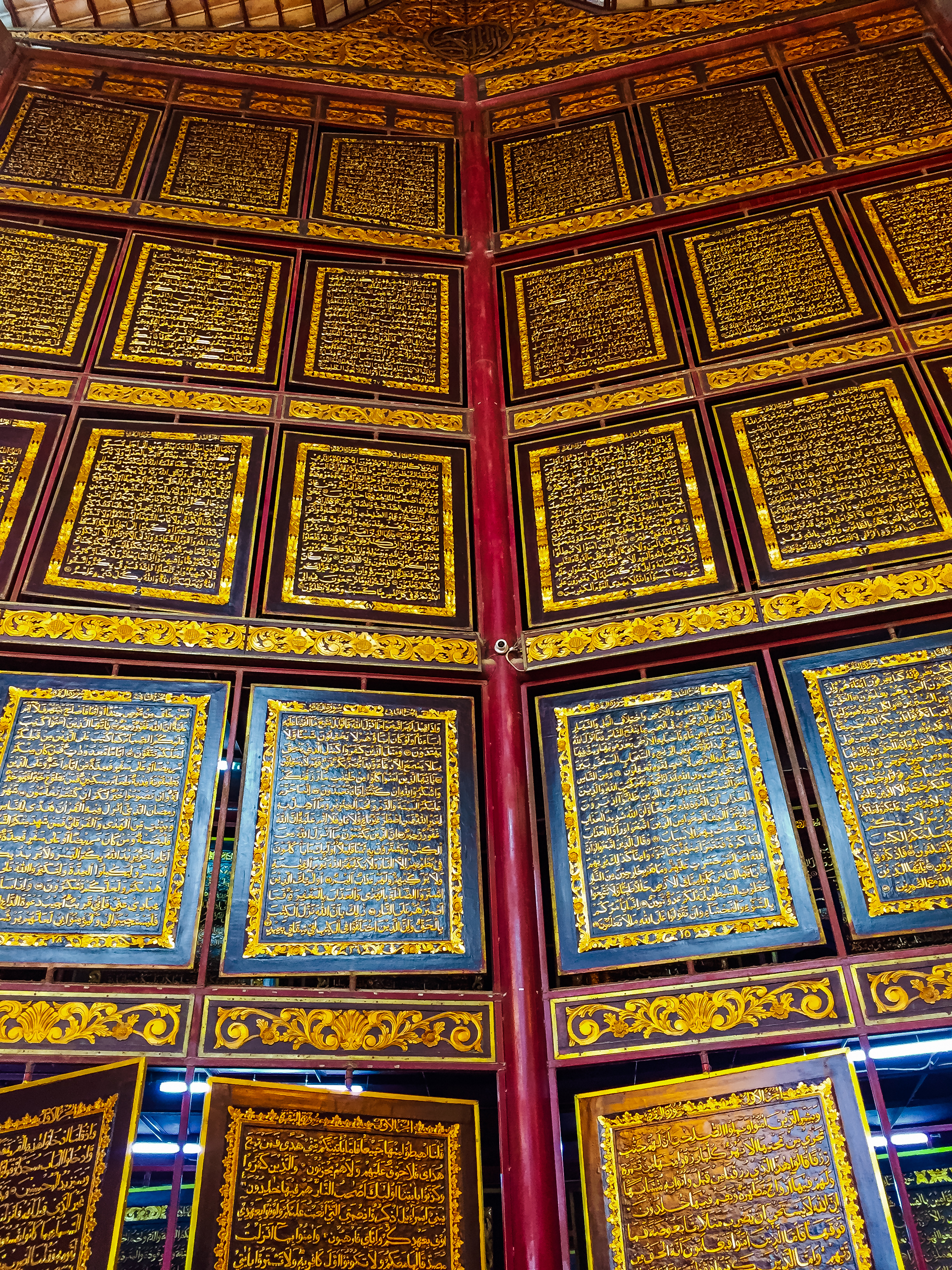
Al-Qur'an Al-Akbar, a major religious site in Palembang. A five-story gigantic replica of the Quran.

- Kampong Arab Al-Munawar, one of kampong in Palembang which is inhabited by Arab Indonesian descendants. This kampong is renowned by the kampong's architecture and culture which is a mixture of local Malay and Arab, especially from Hadhrami. It has been long known that any visitors should dress politely in order to visit this area.
- Kampong Kapitan, one of the oldest Chinese kampong in the city. The primary attraction is Tjoa Ham Hin's house with centuries-old furniture inside. There was also a nearby Chinese temple, which was one of the oldest in Palembang as well. Long before its existence as the Chinese settlement area, it was also called Tanggo Rajo where foreigners and newcomers from the archipelago stayed at.
- Kantor Ledeng, the mayor office of Palembang. It was originally built as a water tower during Dutch rule.
- Kambang Iwak, a pond located in Talang Semut close to Palembang mayor's residence. During Dutch rule, the area around the pond is the residence of Dutch people who works in the city, notable by European architecture on many houses around this pond and abundance of churches in this area. On the banks of this lake, there is a park and recreation arena which is always crowded by locals during weekends and holidays.
- Punti Kayu Tourism Forest, city forest located about six miles (9.7 kilometres) from the city centre with an area of 50 hectares (120 acres) and since 1998 designated as protected forests. In this forest there is a family recreation area and a local shelter a group of monkeys: long-tail macaque (Macaca fascicularis) and monkey (Macaca nemistriana) under the Sumatran Pine wood (Pinus mercussi).
- Sriwijaya Kingdom Archaeological Park, the remnants of Sriwijaya site located on the banks of the River Musi. There is an inscription and stone relics, complex of ancient pond, artificial island and canals dated from the Srivijayan kingdom in this area. The Srivijaya Museum is located in this complex.
- Bukit Seguntang archaeological park, located in the hills west of Palembang city. One of the most major historical areas among the Malay community, it is believed that Sang Sapurba the progenitor all of the Malay Kings descended from this important hill. It is currently turned into a recreational park by the local government. The tombs of the Srivijayan royal family is also being located in the area.
- Monumen Perjuangan Rakyat / Monpera (People Struggle Monument), located in the city centre, adjacent to the Great Mosque and Ampera Bridge. Several relics during Indonesian National Revolution in South Sumatra are exhibited in this monument.
- Sultan Mahmud Badaruddin II Museum, is the former Dutch-era resident office located near the Ampera Bridge and adjacent to Kuto Besak Fort. This museum located in the former royal palace of Palembang Sultanate which was demolished after Dutch conquest of Palembang. This museum exhibits several relics and historical objects with collections spanned from Srivijaya Kingdom period to Palembang Darussalam Sultanate era.
- Museum Balaputradewa, the home of Rumah Limas featured on IDR 10000 banknote. This type of stilt house is the traditional house of the people of Palembang.
- Rumah Limas Haji Aziz, a cultural home richly adorned with various traditional South Sumatran and Palembangese woodcarving. Visitors also have the option to dressed in the local classical attire in the abode.
- Al-Qur'an Al-Akbar, the Grand Quran of Palembang, a giant complete replica of the Muslim holy book. The 5-story quran is a prominent religious site in the area.
- Dekranasda Palembang, a collection of traditional Rumah adats from each South Sumatran regencies.
- Parameswara Monument, a large sculpture to commemorate Parameswara, the Sultan of Malacca from Palembang. The monument is also erected to celebrate the unity between various southeast Asian nations and the brotherhood spirit among the Malay community,

=== Festivals ===
- Bidar race, a traditional Malay rowing tournament is biannually held in Musi River especially on 17 August (Indonesia's Independence Day) and lesserly known 17 June (Palembang Establishment Day). Several bidar rowing teams will sprint across a stretch of Musi River from 35 Ilir Port to Ampera Bridge. The race is always accompanied with a boat carnival.
- Ziarah Kubro, is a tradition held by several thousands of Muslims in Palembang before Ramadan by visiting several tombs of founding fathers, sultans and ulemas of Palembang Sultanate in Palembang.

== Culture ==
Since antiquity, Palembang has been a major port city in Southeast Asia which absorbs neighbouring, as well as foreign, cultures and influences. Throughout its history, Palembang has attracted migrants from other regions in the archipelago, and has made this city as a heterogenous city. Although today the city had lost its function as the major port city in the archipelago, the remnants of its heyday still evident in its culture. Palembangnese people mainly adopt culture which is mainly an amalgamation of Malay and Javanese customs. Even now it can be seen in its culture and language. Word such as "wong (person)" is an example of Javanese loanword in Palembang language. Also the Javanese knight and noble honorific titles, such as Raden Mas or Raden Ayu is used by Palembang nobles, the remnant of Palembang Sultanate courtly culture. The tombs of the Islamic heritage was not different in form and style with Islamic tombs in Java.

=== Cuisine ===
Palembang cuisine is the second most well-known cuisine from Sumatra after Padang. They primarily use freshwater fish and prawn as ingredients due to the paramount role of the Musi River for the area. Spices are also generally included although not as liberal as its same-island counterpart. Malay, Indian, and Chinese culture has also influenced Palembang's culinary scene. Besides freshwater fish dishes, there are many variation of dishes, snacks, drinks, and sweets in Palembang cuisine. The most well known dishes in Palembang include pempek, tekwan, pindang patin, martabak HAR, and wide varieties of Bakmi which is a type of noodle dish. Numerous Palembang cuisines are highly influenced by Chinese culture.

=== Art ===
==== Textile ====
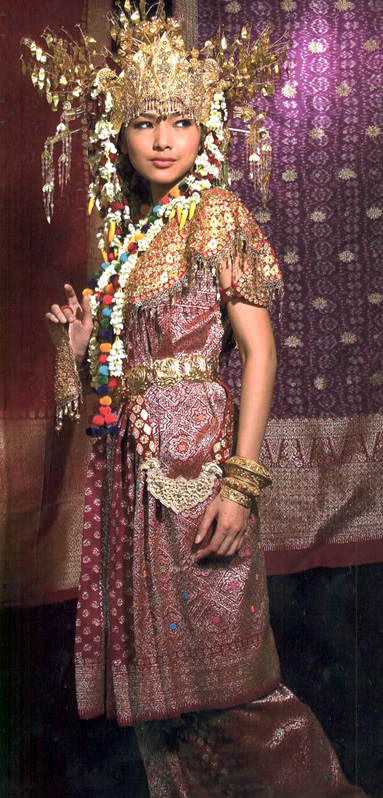
Palembang bride in Aesan Gede wedding costume wearing gold jewellery and songket

Palembang is mainly known for its artistic fabric, songket. This is a hand-woven silk or cotton fabrics patterned with gold or silver threads. It is a luxury product traditionally worn during ceremonial occasions as sarong, shoulder cloths or head ties and tanjak, a headdress songket. During Srivijaya rule, songkets were often used at the court. Songkets are also traditionally worn as an apparel by the Malay royal families in Sumatra and the Malay Peninsula including the Palembang Sultanate. Traditionally women are the weavers of songket, however in this modern time men also are known to weave it as well. There are six main patterns in Palembang songket which are songket lepus, songket tawur, songket tretes mender, songket bungo pacik, combinated songket, and songket limar. These patterns are not only used on songkets, but also as decoration for several structures in Palembang such as underpasses, flyovers, and bridges.

==== Woodcarving ====
Palembang is also known for its woodcarving. Palembang woodcarving are heavily influenced by Chinese culture with motifs such as jasmine or lotus. Palembang woodcarving style originally is used to wardrobe that stores songket fabrics. But nowadays it is often applied to house ornaments and also to many house applicants such as wooden display cabinets, wooden beds, aquariums, photo frames, mirrors, etc.

==== Dance ====
Folk dances have been performed by Palembangnese since antiquity. The most known folk dance of Palembang is Tanggai Dance which was considered sacred in the past since it was performed as an offering to Shiva. Nowadays it was performed in a lot of important ceremonies and weddings.

==== Theatrical performance ====
On several occasions such as kenduri (communal feast), Palembangnese often hired several people to perform a traditional theatrical performance called Dulmuluk, named after its main character, Raja Abdulmuluk Jauhari. Dulmuluk was known at first as a syair which was then adapted into local theatrical performance by Palembangnese in 1910. Dulmuluk often performed during night until the dawn of the next day.

== Sport ==
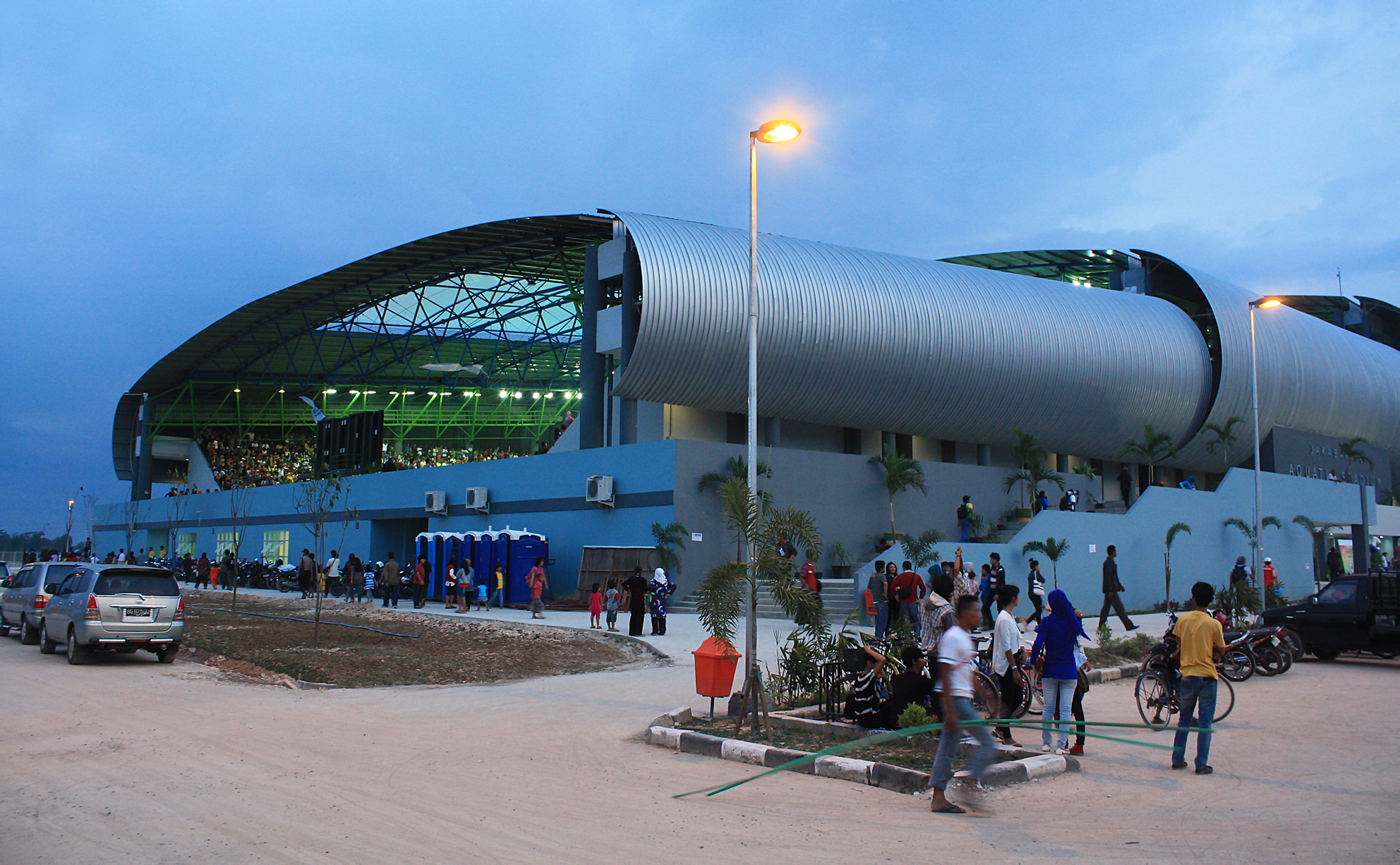
Jakabaring Aquatic Center in Jakabaring Sport City complex

Along with Jakarta, Palembang is notable as having served as a host city of the 2018 Asian Games, the first Asian Games hold officially by two cities and the fourth host city of Asian Games in Southeast Asia after Bangkok in 1998. Palembang is also the main host of 2011 Southeast Asian Games and hosted two matches of 2007 AFC Asian Cup. Sport facilities have been built across the city since 1971 to host Pekan Olahraga Mahasiswa (POM) IX, although the city's main sport complex, Jakabaring Sport City started its construction in 1998 and expanded later in 2010. In order to keep the sport complex into frequent uses, several plans have been raised by the government to encourage more sporting events into the city, included the purchase of an association football club, Persijatim Solo F.C in 2004 which then renamed to Sriwijaya F.C. Palembang also planned to build a race track inside the complex to host a MotoGP race in the city.

Football is regarded as the most popular sport in Palembang. Sriwijaya F.C is the only active professional football club in South Sumatra and widely followed across the province, especially in Palembang as its home base. During its home matches, the stadium often flooded with fans wears yellow shirts on south stands, green shirts on north stands, and black shirts on east stands, representing three main ultras of the club. Badminton, basketball, volleyball and futsal also get some wide attention in the city. Beside Sriwijaya F.C., notable sport teams in Palembang are BSB Hangtuah (basketball) and Palembang Bank Sumsel Babel (volleyball). An Indonesian badminton player, Mohammad Ahsan and Debby Susanto is also from Palembang.

== Education ==
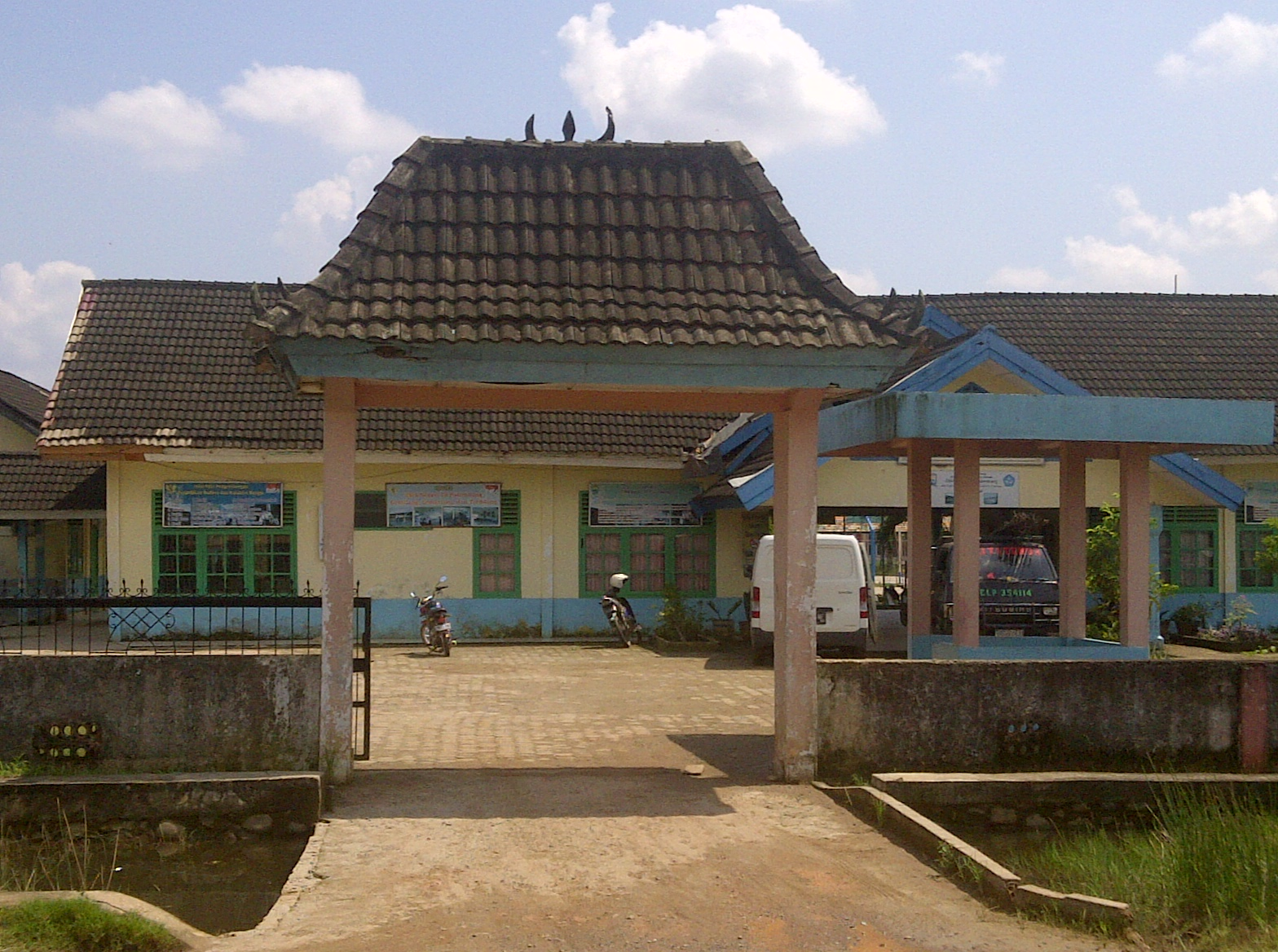
SMA Negeri 19 Palembang, a public high school in Palembang

According to Ministry of Education and Culture, currently there are 462 elementary schools, 243 junior high schools, 140 high schools, and 80 vocational schools in Palembang; most of them privately owned. There are 26 Islamic boarding schools (pesantren) in Palembang as of 2015.

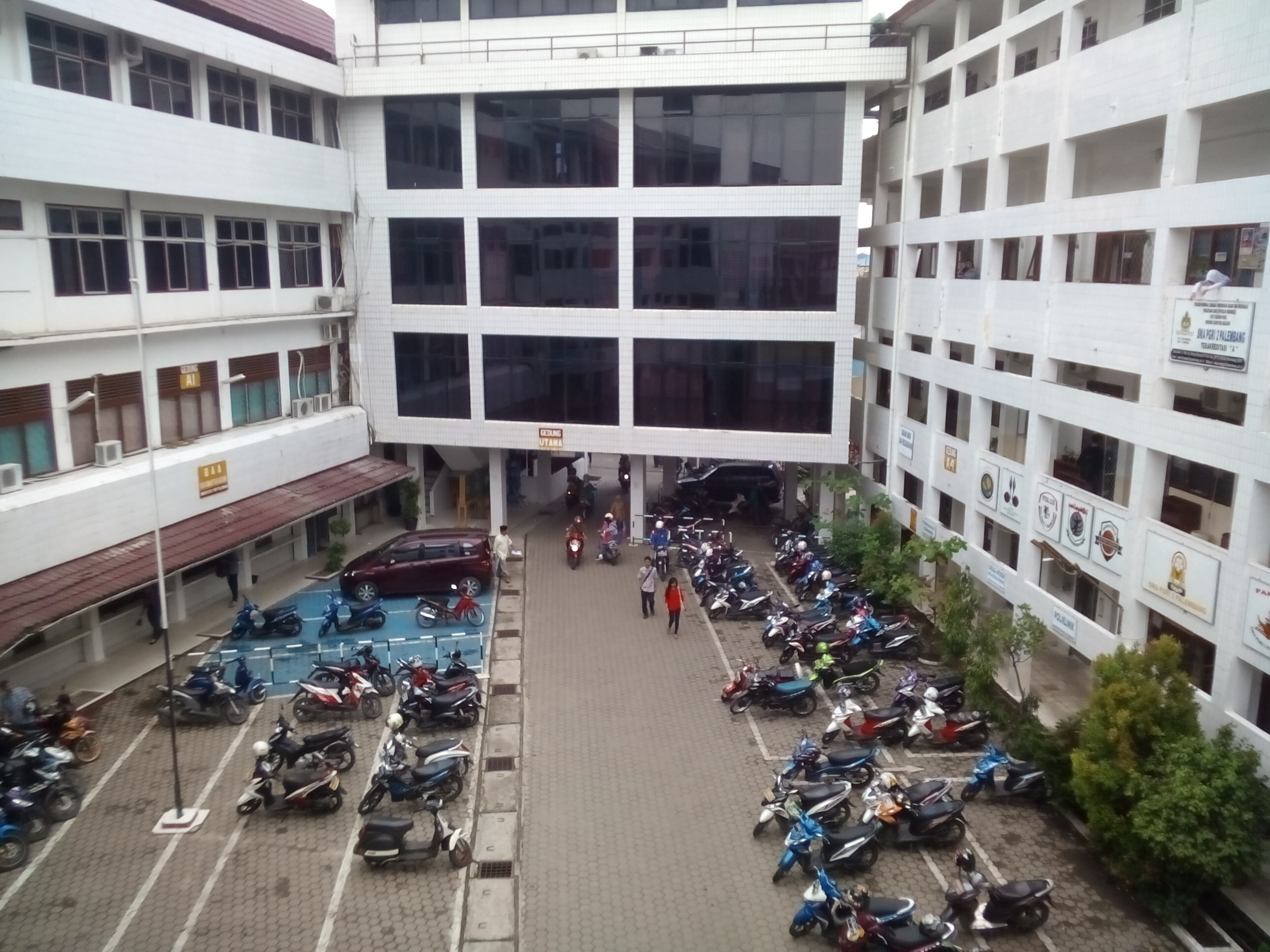
SMA PGRI 2 Palembang, a private high school in Palembang

Christian schools and Buddhist schools are also privately owned and funded. Study centers are available such as GO, Primagama, BKC, Nurul Fikri, BTA, and RuangGuru's Brain Academy.

The city's universities and colleges include Sriwijaya University, Raden Fatah State Islamic University, Sriwijaya State Polytechnic, Muhammadiyah University of Palembang and Bina Darma University.

Other universities include Kader Bangsa, MDP, the Open University of Palembang, IBA, Indo Global Mandiri, PGRI, Tridinanti, Musi Charitas, and Indonesia Sport Polytechnic.

== Twin towns – sister cities ==
- Iloilo City, Philippines (since 2016)
- Zhangzhou, China (since 2002)
- Neiva, Colombia
- Venice, Italy

== See also ==
- Palembang language
- Srivijaya
