= 2024 Pekan Olahraga Nasional =

Multi-sport event in Indonesia

Pekan Olahraga Nasional XXI
- Host city: Aceh; North Sumatra
- Motto: Bersatu Kita Juara! (Together we are Champion!)
- Athletes: 12.919 athletes
- Events: 65 events
- Opening: 9 September 2024
- Closing: 20 September 2024
- Opened by: Joko Widodo
- Closed by: Muhadjir Effendy
- Athlete's Oath: Veddriq Leonardo
- Torch lighter: Nurul Akmal
- Ceremony venue: Harapan Bangsa Stadium (opening); North Sumatra Stadium (closing)
- Website: ponxxi.acehprov.go.id ponxxi.sumutprov.go.id

The National Sports Week 2024 (Indonesian: Pekan Olahraga Nasional XXI, abbreviated as PON XXI), also called as PON Aceh-Sumut 2024, is the twenty first edition of the National Sports Week (PON) which is a major national multi-sport event which take place from 9 to 20 September 2024 with Aceh and North Sumatra as hosts.

This edition marks the first time PON has been held by two provinces at once, also marks the first time it has been held in Aceh, and the second time it has been held in North Sumatra (previously in 1953). This is the fourth time PON has been held in Sumatra (previously Medan 1953, Palembang 2004, Pekanbaru 2012) and the first time since 2012. The youngest provinces, Southwest Papua, Highland Papua, Central Papua and South Papua will make their debut at the PON XXI event. The tournament returns to its usual four-year cycle after the previous tournament was delayed for a year to 2021 due to the COVID-19 pandemic.

PON XXI also commemorates the 20th anniversary of the Aceh and North Sumatra tsunami disaster, which occurred on 26 December 2004.

== Bids ==
The selection of the host took place at the Extraordinary National Sports Conference (Musornaslub) of National Sports Committee of Indonesia (KONI) on 24 April 2018, at the Bidakara Hotel, South Jakarta. This selection was made through a voting mechanism which was attended by KONI representatives from 34 provinces throughout Indonesia.

Host provinces	Votes
Aceh–North Sumatra	24 votes
Bali–West Nusa Tenggara	8 votes
South Kalimantan	2 votes

== Development and preparations ==
=== Venues and infrastructure ===
The North Sumatra government has prepared 100 hectares to build the Sumut Sport Centre for 2024 PON in Kualanamu, Deli Serdang Regency. The North Sumatra Provincial Government has also prepared 300 hectares of land in Sena Village, Batang Kuis, Deli Serdang Regency. Meanwhile, the Aceh government is preparing 240 hectares.

== The Games ==
Tagline of the 2024 PON: Bersatu Kita Juara! (United We're the Champion!)

=== Opening ceremony ===
The opening ceremony is scheduled to take place on 8 September 2024. The ceremony will take place at Harapan Bangsa Stadium, Banda Aceh.

=== Sports ===
The National Sports Week 2024 (PON XXI) will feature 46 sports.

- Aerosport
  - Aeromodelling (9)
  - Gliding (9)
  - Hang gliding (6)
  - Parachuting (6)
  - Paragliding (8)
- Aquatics
  - Diving (10)
  - Open water swimming (6)
  - Swimming (40)
  - Synchronized swimming (3)
  - Water polo (2)
- Archery (18)
- Athletics (46)
- Badminton (7)
- Baseball/Softball
  - Baseball (1)
  - Softball (2)
- Basketball
  - Basketball (2)
  - 3x3 basketball (2)
- Bodybuilding, Powerlifting, Weightlifting
  - Bodybuilding
  - Powerlifting
  - Weightlifting
- Bowling
- Boxing
- Chess (15)
- Cricket (4)
- Cue sports (20)
- Cycling
- Esports
- Equestrian
- Fencing
- Football
  - Football (2)
  - Futsal (1)
- Gymnastics
  - Artistic gymnastics
  - Rhythmic gymnastics
  - Aerobic gymnastics
- Hockey
  - Field hockey (2)
  - Indoor hockey (2)
- Handball (2)
- Judo (17)
- Kenpō (17)
- Human-powered boat racing
  - Canoeing (16)
  - Dragon boat (9)
  - Rowing (15)
- Rugby sevens
- Sport climbing
- Muaythai (18)
- Motorcycle (8)
- Pencak silat (21)
- Roller skating (16)
- Sailing (25)
- Shooting (34)
- Sport climbing (18)
- Sepak takraw (8)
- Squash
- Taekwondo (20)
- Tennis (7)
- Underwater diving (28)
  - Pool
  - Sea
- Volleyball
  - Indoor volleyball (2)
  - Beach volleyball (2)
- Wrestling
  - Freestyle (17)
  - Greco-Roman (9)
- Wushu (23)

=== Exhibition sports ===
Eight sports will be competed as exhibitions at the XXI 2024 National Sports Week (PON) in Aceh and North Sumatra. The eight sports are ice skating, padel, teqball, floorball, pickleball, mixed martial arts, beach handball and horseback archery.

== Participant ==
All the 38 provinces and 1 authority of Indonesia will compete at this event. The details of the number of athletes for each contingent are:

Sports Committee	Number of Athletes
Aceh	1070
North Sumatera	1153
West Sumatera	382
Riau	335
Riau Islands	106
Jambi	217
Bengkulu	68
South Sumatera	257
Bangka Belitung	114
Lampung	364
Special Region of Jakarta	1047
Banten	376
West Java	1210
Central Jawa	743
Special Region of Yogyakarta	443
East Jawa	885
Bali	545
West Nusa Tenggara	251
East Nusa Tenggara	188
West Kalimantan	142
Kalimantan Tengah	113
South Kalimantan	278
East Kalimantan	659
North Kalimantan	94
Capital City of Nusantara	12
North Sulawesi	198
Gorontalo	83
Central Sulawesi	210
Southeast Sulawesi	148
South Sulawesi	404
West Sulawesi	59
North Maluku	30
Maluku	52
Southwest Papua	34
West Papua	133
Central Papua	51
Papua	333
Highland Papua	102
South Papua	30

== Participating Provincial Sports Committee ==
All the 38 provinces and 1 authority of Indonesia will compete at this event, including the youngest provinces, Southwest Papua, Highland Papua, Central Papua, and South Papua, also Nusantara, will make their debut at the PON event.

Participating Provincial Sports Committees PON XXI 2024
- Aceh (host)
- Bali
- Banten
- Bengkulu
- Gorontalo
- Jakarta
- Jambi
- West Java
- Central Java
- East Java
- West Kalimantan
- South Kalimantan
- Central Kalimantan
- East Kalimantan
- North Kalimantan
- Bangka Belitung Islands
- Riau Islands
- Lampung
- Maluku
- North Maluku
- Nusantara
- West Nusa Tenggara
- East Nusa Tenggara
- Papua
- West Papua
- Southwest Papua
- Central Papua
- Highland Papua
- South Papua
- Riau
- West Sulawesi
- South Sulawesi
- Central Sulawesi
- Southeast Sulawesi
- Special Region of Yogyakarta
- North Sulawesi
- West Sumatra
- South Sumatra
- North Sumatra (host)

== Calendar ==
The following schedule is correct as of the latest update. The exact schedule can change up until the end of the games.

All times and dates use Western Indonesia Time (UTC+7)

OC	Opening ceremony	●	Event competitions	1	Gold medal events	CC	Closing ceremony

== Medal table ==
List as per Wednesday, 21 September 2024 at 10:00 p.m. local time.

* Host nation (Aceh and North Sumatra)

2024 Pekan Olahraga Nasional medal tablesports.
Rank	Province	Gold	Silver	Bronze	Total
1	West Java	195	163	182	540
2	Jakarta	184	150	145	479
3	East Java	146	136	143	425
4	North Sumatra*	79	59	116	254
5	Central Java	71	74	115	260
6	Aceh*	65	48	79	192
7	Bali	36	38	60	134
8	East Kalimantan	29	55	69	153
9	Special Region of Yogyakarta	29	36	52	117
10	Lampung	22	16	30	68
11	Banten	21	24	33	78
12	Riau	21	22	37	80
13	Papua	19	26	23	68
14	West Nusa Tenggara	16	17	21	54
15	South Kalimantan	15	15	26	56
16	South Sulawesi	10	19	32	61
17	North Sulawesi	10	14	18	42
18	Central Sulawesi	8	7	20	35
19	East Nusa Tenggara	7	13	16	36
20	Jambi	6	18	27	51
21	South Sumatra	6	15	30	51
22	West Papua	6	7	16	29
23	Highland Papua	6	0	3	9
24	West Sumatra	5	14	30	49
25	Riau Islands	5	6	8	19
26	West Kalimantan	4	7	19	30
27	Central Papua	4	5	7	16
28	Gorontalo	3	4	6	13
29	Bangka Belitung	3	2	6	11
30	North Kalimantan	3	1	5	9
31	Maluku	2	3	8	13
32	Southwest Papua	2	0	4	6
33	Central Kalimantan	1	9	3	13
34	Southeast Sulawesi	1	5	8	14
35	South Papua	0	2	2	4
36	West Sulawesi	0	2	0	2
37	Bengkulu	0	0	7	7
38	North Maluku	0	0	2	2
39	Nusantara (Note: No medals count. Capital City of Nusantara is just an honorary invitee.)	0	0	0	0
Totals (39 entries)		1,040	1,032	1,408	3,480

== Concerns and controversies ==
=== Lead-up ===
The 2024 PON has been marred by numerous issues and is widely considered the worst in history. One of the most significant problems has been the substandard quality of food and transportation provided for the athletes. In addition to the incomplete construction of competition venues, various PON venues in Aceh have gradually collapsed during competitions due to their inability to withstand heavy rainfall. These include the collapsed roof of the shooting range, the destroyed archery field, and the shattered windows of the basketball court. These incidents have drawn significant international and domestic media attention, raising questions about the quality of preparations and management of such a large-scale sporting event.

=== Controversies ===
The 2024 PON men's soccer quarter-final match between Aceh and Central Sulawesi was marred by controversy triggered by the leadership of referee Eko Agus Sugih Harto from South Sumatra. His leadership was considered full of oddities, especially in several decisions that blatantly benefit Aceh, host of the event. The match became heated when the referee issued three red cards and gave two penalties to Aceh even though there were no clear violations. These decisions made the Central Sulawesi team feel unfairly treated until they finally decided not to continue the match when the score was still 1–1 in extra time. As a result of this incident, the Aceh team, which qualified for the semifinals, allegedly deliberately defeated themselves when facing East Java. This action was allegedly taken to avoid criticism from Indonesian netizens who were disappointed with Aceh's controversial victory over Central Sulawesi.

Preceded by 2021; Jayapura, Papua	Pekan Olahraga Nasional	Succeeded by 2028; West Nusa Tenggara-East Nusa Tenggara
