= Sepak Takraw Association of Indonesia =

Sport governing body

- Sport: Sepaktakraw
- Abbreviation: PSTI
- Founded: 1971
- Affiliation: International Sepaktakraw Federation (ISTAF)
- Location: Dieksi Gelora Karno Lt. 8 Senayan Building, Central Jakarta, DKI Jakarta
- Chairman: Asnawi Abdurahman
- (Indonesia)

The Sepak Takraw Association of Indonesia (Indonesian: Persatuan Sepak takraw Indonesia; abbreviated PSTI), is the national governing body for sepaktakraw in Indonesia, officially found in 1971 with four founding regional affiliations, and had been becoming a member of the National Sports Committee of Indonesia (KONI) since 1979. Originally, PSTI officially registered under the title ‘Persatuan Sepak Raga Seluruh Indonesia’ (PERSERAS), however, after the inception of the Asian Sepaktakraw Federation in 1982, which the PERSERAS was considered one of the founding members, the organization was renamed to ‘Persatuan Sepak Takraw Seluruh Indonesia’ (PERSETASI) and lastly, as known today, ‘Persatuan Sepak Takraw Indonesia’ (PSTI).

The roles of the PSTI include organizing sepaktakraw competitions in Indonesia, supporting and co-ordinating sepaktakraw clubs, and managing the Indonesian sepaktakraw teams, organizing the domestic tournaments, the National Sepak Takraw Championship as well as a selection of players for the international competitions.

== History ==
The inauguration national governing body for sepaktakraw in Indonesia was firstly found on 16 March 1971, named ‘Persatuan Sepak Raga Seluruh Indonesia’ (PERSERASI), with only 4 founding regional affiliations (Pengda), including: North Sumatra, West Sumatra, Riau and South Sulawesi, with Junus Akbar served as the first general chairman. Firstly, PERSERASI did not recognize as the national governing body by the National Sports Committee of Indonesia (Komite Olahraga Nasional Indonesia; KONI) due to a small number of its membership. Until 1979, a total of 14 regional government officials had been formed, as a minimum requirement to be accepted as a member of KONI, the organization consequently launched the first Indonesia Sepaktakraw League, Kejuaran Nasional Sepak Takraw (National Sepak Takraw Championship), in 1980.

As a member of KONI, sepaktakraw eventually became the official sport in the national multi-sport event, 1981 Pekan Olahraga Nasional (PON XI/1981; 11th National Sports Week), which caused the increase of the region affiliations in the following years. In 1985, there were 20 regional teams competed in sepaktakraw at PON XV/1985, a year after PON XV, a National Championship was held as a selection of players for the 1987 Southeast Asian Games in Jakarta, which was participated by 23 regions.

In 1986, Marjoeni Warga Negara was elected as the new general chairman and the PERSERASI was renamed to ‘Persatuan Sepak Takraw Seluruh Indonesia’ (PERSETASI, today as PSTI). During the era of Marjoeni, Bali, East Timur as well as East Nusa Tenggara, joined the federation. Later in 1996, Marjoeni Warga Negara was replaced by Beddu Amang. PERSETASI has completely settled in all 27 provinces in his era. Maluku was the last province to become a member. Usually, a chairperson of the association will be expired from the term of office after completing their four-year term.

The Sepak Takraw Association of Indonesia was one of the founding members of the Asian Sepaktakraw Federation (ASTAF), and the international affiliation International Sepaktakraw Federation (ISTAF), which was established in 1982 and 1992, respectively.

== Board of directors ==
The following list is featured the current board of directors of the Sepaktakraw Association of Indonesia.

Position	Name
Chairperson	Asnawi Abdul Rachman (2021 – 2025)
Secretary	

Former chairperson

- Asnawi Rahman (2017 – 2021)
- Anjas Rivai (2014 – 2017)
- Basri Sidehabi (2008 – 2012)
- Beddu Amang (1996 – 1999)
- Marjoeni Warga Negara (1986 – 1996)
- Junus Akbar (1971 – 1986)

== Regional affiliations ==
Provincial PSTI administrators (Pengprov) is the governing body of sepaktakraw for the province in Indonesia. The pengproves are responsible for coordinating community sepaktakraw teams and developing sepaktakraw in their region and also made up the structure of PSTI as the official governing body of sepaktakraw in Indonesia.

There is a total of 34 Provincial-level Sepaktakraw Associations affiliated to the PSTI. Other community PSTIs usually operate under the regulation of the provincial association on which the commune is located.

Sumatra region
Pengprov	Chairperson
Aceh	
Bangka Belitung	
Bengkulu	Fahmi Pranata
Jambi	
Lampung	Abdul Malik
North Sumatra	Syafrul Hayadi
Riau	Rudianto Manurung
Riau Islands	
South Sumatra	
West Sumatra	Syafrizal Bakhtiar

Java and Kalimantan regions
Pengprov	Chairperson
DKI Jakarta	
Banten	Golib Abdul Mutolib
Central Java	Ketua Harian
East Java	Edy Santoso
Jakarta	
West Java	
DI Yogyakarta	Arief Sudarmanto
Central Kalimantan	
East Kalimantan	
North Kalimantan	
South Kalimantan	
West Kalimantan	

Other regions
Pengprov	Chairperson
Bali	
East Nusa Tenggara	
West Nusa Tenggara	Muhammad Rum
Central Sulawesi	Abdul Raaf Malik
Gorontalo	
North Sulawesi	Jon Singkey
Southeast Sulawesi	
South Sulawesi	
West Sulawesi	
Maluku	
North Maluku	
Papua	Elia Loupatty
West Papua	Muhammad Sahir
