= 2000 Pekan Olahraga Nasional =

Multi-sport event in Surabaya, Indonesia

Pekan Olahraga Nasional XV
- Host city: Surabaya, East Java
- Athletes: 5,720
- Events: 46
- Opening: Juni 19, 2000
- Closing: Juni 30,2000
- Opened by: Megawati Sukarnoputri; Vice President of Indonesia
- Torch lighter: Alan Budikusuma
- Ceremony venue: Gelora Delta Stadium

The 2000 Pekan Olahraga Nasional (commonly referred to as PON XV) was the 15th edition of the Pekan Olahraga Nasional, a major national multi-sport event, held from June 19 to 30, with Surabaya, East Java as the host. This edition marked the first time the PON was held after the collapse of the New Order, and the first time it was held outside Jakarta since 1969. The games also marked the second time the PON was held in East Java, the previous being in 1969. This was the first time the PON was held after the East Timor seceded from Indonesia.

== Sports ==
- Synchronized swimming
- Water polo
- Swimming
- Judo
- Wrestling
- Hockey
- Football
- Basketball
- Badminton
- Sepak takraw

== Medal table ==
2024 Pekan Olahraga Nasional medal table
Rank	Province	Gold	Silver	Bronze	Total
1	East Java	132	109	114	355
2	Jakarta	115	85	96	296
3	West Java	83	91	108	282
4	Central Java	42	63	67	172
5	Lampung	19	22	26	67
6	Jambi	19	9	13	41
7	Papua	18	19	24	61
8	East Kalimantan	14	11	17	42
9	North Sumatra	14	10	19	43
10	South Sulawesi	12	13	19	44
11	North Sulawesi	11	15	17	43
12	South Kalimantan	11	8	10	39
13	Bali	10	10	15	35
14	South Sumatra	8	13	15	36
15	Southeast Sulawesi	8	5	13	26
16	Yogyakarta Special Region	6	13	26	45
17	Maluku	6	3	6	15
18	Riau	5	9	15	29
19	West Kalimantan	4	8	8	20
20	East Nusa Tenggara	4	6	9	19
21	Central Kalimantan	3	11	18	32
22	West Nusa Tenggara	3	6	9	18
23	Central Sulawesi	2	1	3	6
24	Bengkulu	1	3	5	9
25	Aceh	1	1	13	15
26	West Sumatra	0	4	7	11
Total		551	548	692	1,791

Preceded by 1996; Jakarta	Pekan Olahraga Nasional	Succeeded by 2004; Palembang, South Sumatra
