= 2012 Pekan Olahraga Nasional =

- The Lancang Kuning emblem, Riau traditional ship
- Host city: Pekanbaru
- Motto: Sportivitas untuk Kualitas (Sportsmanship for Quality)
- Athletes: 11.276
- Events: 43 sports
- Opening: 11 September
- Closing: 20 September
- Opened by: Susilo Bambang Yudhoyono; President of Indonesia
- Athlete's Oath: Barry Agustini
- Judge's Oath: Jefrizal
- Torch lighter: Zaini Bachtiar (Bodybuilder)
- Ceremony venue: Riau Main Stadium, Pekanbaru
- Website: PON Riau 2012

2012 Pekan Olahraga Nasional or 2012 National Sports Week was a multi-sport event in Indonesia which was held in Riau from 9–20 September 2012. The previous edition was held in East Kalimantan. Thousands of athletes, officials, and journalists all across of Indonesian provinces participated to the game.

== Host selection ==
Riau won the selection of 2012 Pekan Olahraga Nasional host.

Host city	Host province	Round 1	Round 2	Round 3	Round 4	Round 5
Pekanbaru	Riau	34	40	56	67	78
Bandung	West Java	37	45	49	59	60
Semarang	Central Java	28	34	35	14	-
Mataram eliminated	West Nusa Tenggara	21	16	17	-	-
Pontianakeliminated	West Kalimantan	19	14	-	-	-

== Countdown ==
365 days before PON will be started, there is an inauguration of 2012 PON countdown timer. The celebration brought in some famous Indonesian singers, like Iwan Fals, Geisha, Lyla, etc. The timer is located in the heart of Pekanbaru city, at Jalan Cut Nyak Dien between two iconic buildings, Menara Lancang Kuning and Soeman HS Library. This timer is the very first countdown timer for Pekan Olahraga Nasional events.

== Mascot ==
Bujang Serindit was the name of the mascot. Representation of Burung Serindit (Blue-crowned Hanging Parrot) native birds from Southeast Asia. Bujang Serindit wearing traditional Riau costume.

== Venues ==
Venues for PON 2012 build in 11 city in the Riau.

=== Pekanbaru ===
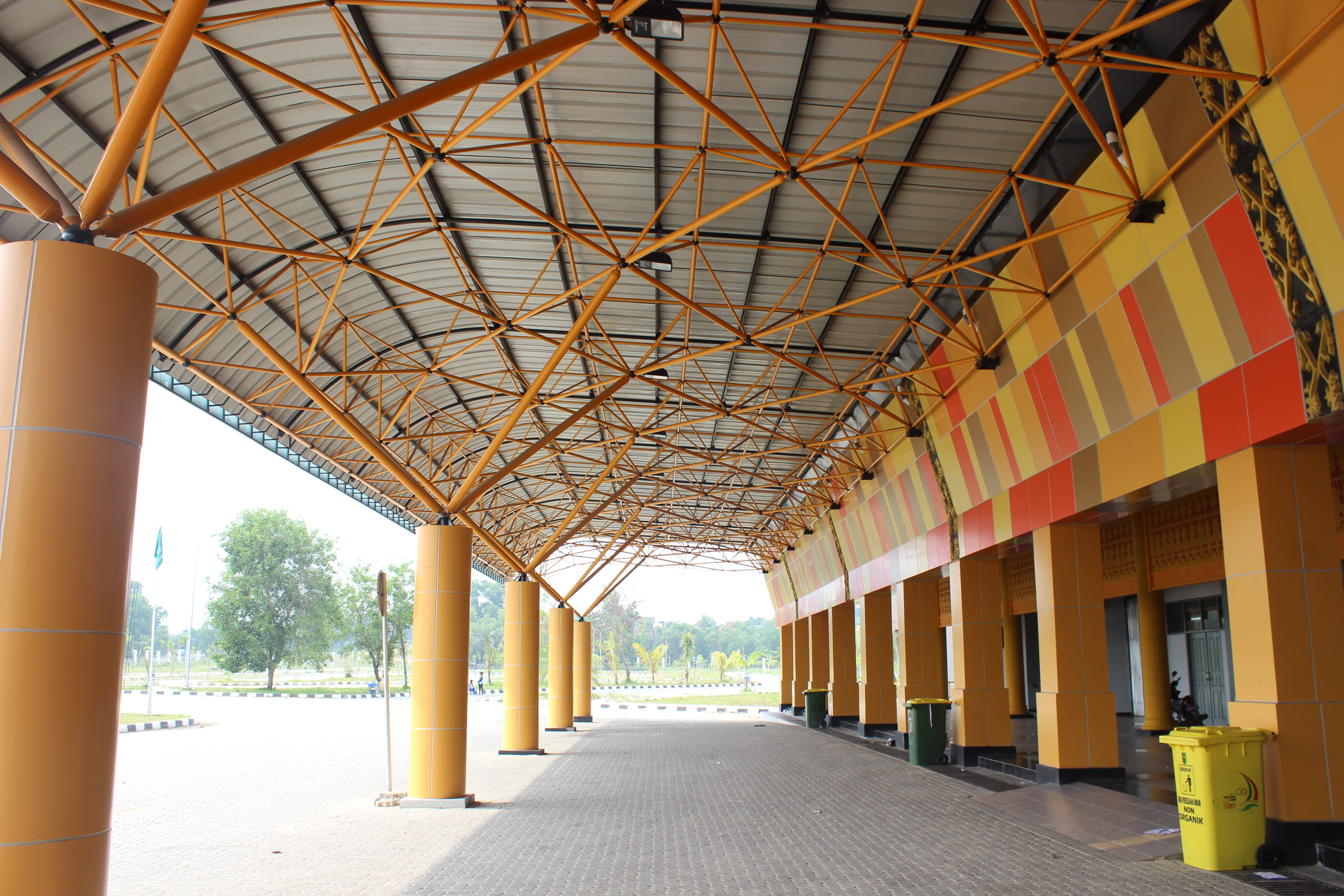
Kaharuddin Nasution Stadium

Venues	Sports
Riau Main Stadium	Football
Riau University students center	Judo
Riau University Wall Climbing Arena	Wall climbing
Rumbai Stadium	Football (Qualification)
Rumbai Athletic Stadium	Athletics
Rumbai Aquatic Stadium	Aquatic
Rumbai Basketball Stadium	Basketball
Rumbai Gymnastic Stadium	Gymnastic
Rumbai Self-defense Indoor Stadium	Wushu
Rumbai Shooting Hall	Shooting
Chevron Softball Stadium	Softball
Riau Baseball Stadium	Baseball
Chevron Squash Arena	Squash
Bandar Sri Kayangan Lake	Water skiing
Kainjuhan swimming pool	Water polo
Lancang Kuning University students center	Fencing
National Islamic University students center	Taekwondo
Riau Islamic University students center	Wrestling
Riau Islamic University Indoor Stadium	Volleyball
Riau Islamic University Archery Stadium	Archery
Sepak Takraw Hall	Sepak takraw
Youth Sports Arena	Badminton
PTPN V Tennis Court	Tennis
Tribuana Sports Arena	Karate
Ratu Mayang Garden Hotel	Weightlifting
New Hollywood Hotel	Bodybuilding
Pangeran Hotel	Chess
Furaya Hotel	Bridge
Bowling and Billiard Center	Bowling
Purna MTQ	Billiard
Idrus Tintin Art Pavilion	Dancing

=== Kampar ===
Venues	Sports
Tuanku Tambusai Stadium	Football (Qualification)
Kampar Sports Hall	Pencak silat
Kampar Motor Racing Arena	Racing
Labersa Country Club	Golf

=== Dumai ===
Venues	Sports
Dumai Chevron Sports Hall	Table tennis (Qualification)
Sasana Tirta Swimming Pool	Finswimming (mono)
RORO Pier	Finswimming (bi)

=== Pelalawan ===
Venues	Sports
Pelalawan Boxing stadium area	Boxing

=== Bengkalis ===
Venues	Sports
Perkasa Alam Sport Hall	Tarung Derajat
Selat Baru Beach	Sailing
Bandar Sri Maharaja	Beach volleyball

=== Siak ===
Venues	Sports
Siak Sri Inderapura stadium arena	Kempo
Dayun Race Arena	Cycling

=== Kuantan Singingi ===
Venues	Sports
Kebun Kopi Sport Center	Keno, Kayaking, Dragon boat
Kuangsing Grand Stadium	Football (Qualification)

=== Rokan Hulu ===
Venues	Sports
Tuanku Tambusai Airport	Paragliding

=== Indragiri Hulu ===
Venus	Sports
Narasinga Grand Stadium	Futsal (Qualification)

=== Indragiri Hilir ===
Venues	Sports
Tembilanhan Grand Stadium	Futsal

== Opening ceremony ==
The opening ceremony was scheduled 9 September 2012 but moved to 11 September due to President's schedule. Fireworks attraction started the ceremony, followed by some traditional dances. Judika (Indonesian Idol finalist) sang the theme song of the 2012 PON, Selamat Datang Sang Juara (Welcome the Champions). The athletes' parade then started, Aceh paraded first in the athletes' parade. The parade is organized by alphabetical order, the last team to parade is the veteran athletes from the first PON in Surakarta.
Then, 8 former national athletes brought the Pekan Olahraga Nasional Flag to the stadium, which is hoisted and followed by a singer singing the PON theme. After the hoisting of the PON flag, Barry Agustini took the Athlete's Oath, while Jefrizal took the Judge's Oath. The last section of the ceremony was the lighting of the PON cauldron. The torch was brought by former athlete Titi Syarif Sudibyo. The torch was passed to Amril Nurman, 5 times PON gold medalist in badminton from Riau. Amril Nurman brought the torch in a replica of Lancang Kuning, which moved through the stadium floor. Amril then passed the torch to a man riding a white horse. The man depicts Tuanku Tambusai, famous hero from Riau. The cauldron was lighted by Zaini Bachtiar, using a spear shaped torch which was thrown to the cauldron. The spear didn't reach the cauldron, but the cauldron is still lit.

== The Games ==
=== Participating province ===
Athletes from 33 provincial sports committee are expected to participate.

- Aceh
- Bali
- Bangka Belitung
- Banten
- Bengkulu
- Central Java
- Central Kalimantan
- Central Sulawesi
- East Java
- East Kalimantan
- East Nusa Tenggara
- Gorontalo
- Jakarta
- Jambi
- Lampung
- Maluku
- North Maluku
- North Sulawesi
- North Sumatra
- Papua
- Riau
- Riau Islands
- South East Sulawesi
- South Kalimantan
- South Sulawesi
- South Sumatra
- West Java
- West Kalimantan
- West Nusa Tenggara
- West Papua
- West Sulawesi
- West Sumatra
- Yogyakarta

=== Sports ===
The 2012 National Sports Week programme features 32 sports and a total of 44 disciplines.

- Archery
- Athletics
- Badminton
- Baseball
- Basketball
- Billiard and Snooker
- Boxing
- Canoeing/rowing
  - Flat water racing
  - Traditional boat race
- Cycling
  - BMX
  - Mountain biking
  - Road
  - Track
- Diving
- Equestrian
- Fencing
- Field hockey
- Football (details)
  - Futsal (details)
- Gymnastics
  - Artistic gymnastics
  - Rhythmic gymnastics
  - Aerobic gymnastics
- Golf
- Judo
- Karate
- Pencak silat
- Sailing
- Shooting
- Softball
- Swimming (32)
- Synchronized swimming
- Sepak takraw
- Table tennis
- Taekwondo
- Tennis
- Volleyball
  - Indoor volleyball
  - Beach volleyball
- Weightlifting
- Bodybuilding
- Wrestling
- Wushu

== Medal table ==
List of medals in the closing of the games:

Host

Medal
Rank	Status	Province	Gold	Silver	Bronze	Total
1	▲1	DKI Jakarta	110	101	112	323
2	▲2	West Java	99	79	101	279
3	▼2	East Java	86	86	84	256
4	▲1	Central Java	47	52	68	167
5	▼2	East Kalimantan	44	45	50	139
6	▲4	Riau	43	39	51	133
7	▼1	South Sulawesi	19	17	21	57
8	▼1	North Sumatera	15	19	23	57
9	Steady	Bali	15	18	30	63
10	▼2	Lampung	15	9	10	34
11	▲5	West Sumatera	12	12	25	49
12	▲13	West Nusa Tenggara	11	5	8	24
13	▲1	South Sumatera	10	14	29	53
14	▼1	Yogyakarta Special Region	10	12	16	38
15	▼4	Papua	9	11	16	36
16	▲5	West Kalimantan	6	6	13	25
17	▼5	North Sulawesi	6	6	8	20
18	▲8	Central Kalimantan	6	4	6	16
19	▼1	South Kalimantan	5	12	19	36
20	Steady	Maluku	4	10	5	19
21	▲1	Banten	4	8	18	30
22	▲5	Riau Islands	4	1	5	10
23	▲1	East Nusa Tenggara	3	9	5	17
24	▼9	Jambi	3	8	20	31
25	▼2	Aceh	3	5	18	26
26	▼7	West Papua	3	3	11	17
27	▼10	Southeast Sulawesi	3	0	2	5
28	▲1	Bangka Belitung	2	3	4	9
29	▲3	Gorontalo	2	1	1	4
30	▲1	Central Sulawesi	1	1	1	3
31	▼3	Bengkulu	0	2	4	6
32	▼2	North Maluku	0	0	1	1
33	Steady	West Sulawesi	0	0	0	0
Total			600	598	785	1983

Preceded by 2008; Samarinda, East Kalimantan	Pekan Olahraga Nasional	Succeeded by 2016; Bandung, West Java
