= 2008 Pekan Olahraga Nasional =

Multi-sport event in Indonesia

Pekan Olahraga Nasional XVII
- Host city: Samarinda
- Motto: Kita semua satu! (We Are All One!)
- Athletes: 7,946
- Events: 43 sports
- Opening: 5 July
- Closing: 17 July
- Opened by: Susilo Bambang Yudhoyono; President of Indonesia
- Athlete's Oath: M. Said
- Judge's Oath: Andi Irwansyah
- Torch lighter: Alfons Liung
- Ceremony venue: Palaran Stadium, Samarinda, East Kalimantan

2008 Pekan Olahraga National or the Indonesia National Games XVII were a major multi-sport event in Indonesia which took place in Samarinda, East Kalimantan from 5–17 July 2008. A total of 7,946 athletes participated in the biggest-ever Pekan Olahraga Nasional and also the first on the island of Borneo. These games make Samarinda the second city to host Pekan Olahraga Nasional outside of the island of Java and Sumatra, after Makassar hosted the 1957 Pekan Olahraga Nasional.

Samarinda was awarded the right to host the games over three competitors, Pekanbaru, Bandung, and Semarang. Later, Pekanbaru was chosen to be the host of eighteenth edition of the games in 2012.

== Host selection ==
| Host city | Host province | Round 1 | Round 2 | Round 3 | Round 4 | Round 5 |
|---|---|---|---|---|---|---|
| Samarinda | East Kalimantan | 35 | 39 | 45 | 55 | 68 |
| Pekanbaru | Riau | 30 | 43 | 49 | 52 | 59 |
| Bandung | West Java | 38 | 33 | 26 | 21 | - |
| Manado Elimination | North Sulawesi | 33 | 29 | 15 | - | - |
| Banjarmasin Elimination | South Kalimantan | 20 | 19 | - | - | - |

== Mascots ==
Mascots for the games are three endangered species of the East Kalimantan province and also representing three elements: land, water, and air.

- Hornbill
- Mahakam dolphin
- Orangutan

== Sports ==
- Aerospace games
  - Hang gliding
  - Model aircraft
  - Parachuting
  - Paragliding
- Aquatics
  - Diving
  - Swimming
  - Synchronized swimming
  - Water polo
- Archery
- Athletics
- Badminton
- Baseball and Softball
- Basketball
- Billiards
- Bowling
- Boxing
- Chess
- Climbing
- Contract bridge
- Cycling
  - BMX
  - Road
  - Mountain biking
- Dancesport
- Equestrian
- Fencing
- Finswimming
- Football
- Golf
- Gymnastics
  - Artistic
  - Rhythmic
  - Aerobic
- Hockey
- Judo
- Karate
- Kenpo
- Pencak silat
- Marching band
- Motorcycling
- Rowing and Canoeing
- Sailing
- Sepak takraw
- Shooting
- Skating
- Squash
- Table tennis
- Taekwondo
- Tarung Derajat
- Tennis
- Volleyball
  - Indoor
  - Beach
- Water skiing
- Weightlifting, Powerlifting, and Bodybuilding
- Wrestling
- Wushu

== Co-hosts ==
Although Samarinda is the main host for the games, several sports also played in other cities in East Kalimantan, they are:

- Balikpapan
- Berau
- Bontang
- Kutai Kartanegara
- Tarakan

== Medal table ==
| Rank | Status | Province | Gold | Silver | Bronze | Total |
|---|---|---|---|---|---|---|
| 1 | ▲2 | East Java | 139 | 113 | 111 | 363 |
| 2 | ▼1 | Jakarta | 119 | 117 | 122 | 358 |
| 3 | ▲9 | East Kalimantan | 116 | 111 | 115 | 342 |
| 4 | ▼3 | West Java | 101 | 84 | 132 | 317 |
| 5 | ▼4 | Central Java | 52 | 81 | 80 | 213 |
| 6 | ▲10 | South Sulawesi | 25 | 23 | 28 | 76 |
| 7 | ▲12 | North Sumatra | 20 | 11 | 29 | 60 |
| 8 | Steady | Lampung | 18 | 12 | 19 | 49 |
| 9 | ▲14 | Bali | 16 | 18 | 26 | 60 |
| 10 | ▲11 | Riau | 16 | 14 | 23 | 53 |
| 11 | ▼7 | Papua | 14 | 21 | 17 | 52 |
| 12 | ▲13 | North Sulawesi | 14 | 11 | 16 | 41 |
| 13 | ▲15 | Yogyakarta | 12 | 16 | 21 | 49 |
| 14 | ▼5 | South Sumatra | 12 | 11 | 17 | 40 |
| 15 | ▼6 | Jambi | 11 | 17 | 28 | 56 |
| 16 | ▲21 | West Sumatra | 8 | 16 | 38 | 62 |
| 17 | Steady | Southeast Sulawesi | 8 | 5 | 12 | 25 |
| 18 | ▼16 | South Kalimantan | 7 | 6 | 10 | 23 |
| 19 | Steady | West Papua | 7 | 1 | 7 | 15 |
| 20 | ▲25 | Maluku | 6 | 2 | 16 | 24 |
| 21 | ▼18 | West Kalimantan | 5 | 14 | 11 | 30 |
| 22 | ▼20 | Banten | 5 | 12 | 30 | 47 |
| 23 | ▼22 | Aceh | 4 | 4 | 10 | 18 |
| 24 | ▼19 | East Nusa Tenggara | 3 | 4 | 6 | 13 |
| 25 | ▼23 | West Nusa Tenggara | 3 | 3 | 9 | 15 |
| 26 | ▼24 | Central Kalimantan | 2 | 9 | 9 | 20 |
| 27 | Steady | Riau Islands | 2 | 5 | 1 | 8 |
| 28 | Steady | Bengkulu | 2 | 2 | 5 | 9 |
| 29 | ▼26 | Bangka Belitung | 1 | 2 | 4 | 7 |
| 30 | ▼29 | North Maluku | 1 | 1 | 3 | 5 |
| 31 | ▼27 | Central Sulawesi | 0 | 3 | 6 | 9 |
| 32 | ▼30 | Gorontalo | 0 | 0 | 1 | 1 |
| 33 | Steady | West Sulawesi | 0 | 0 | 1 | 1 |
| Total | | | 749 | 749 | 962 | 2460 |

| Preceded by 2004; Palembang, South Sumatera | Pekan Olahraga Nasional | Succeeded by 2012; Pekanbaru, Riau |
