= 2016 Pekan Olahraga Nasional =

Pekan Olahraga Nasional XIX
- Host city: Bandung
- Motto: Berjaya di Tanah Legenda (Glory in the Land of Legends)
- Events: 44 sports
- Opening: 17 September 2016
- Closing: 29 September 2016
- Opened by: Joko Widodo; President of Indonesia
- Closed by: Jusuf Kalla; Vice President of Indonesia
- Torch lighter: Lala Diah Pitaloka
- Ceremony venue: Gelora Bandung Lautan Api Stadium

2016 Pekan Olahraga Nasional is the nineteenth edition of Pekan Olahraga Nasional. It was held in Bandung, West Java in 2016. It was the first time for Indonesia's third largest city of Bandung to host the games in more than forty years. Bandung hosted the fifth edition of Pekan Olahraga Nasional in 1961.

== Bids ==
West Java was given the rights to host the 2016 Pekan Olahraga Nasional by acclamation of the members of National Sports Committee of Indonesia. Banten was the only other applicant which submitted its bid for the games. North Sulawesi showed its interest in hosting, but later decided to cancel it.

== Venues ==
Events will take place in 68 venues, each venues will be feature in 16 cities and regencies of West Java Province.

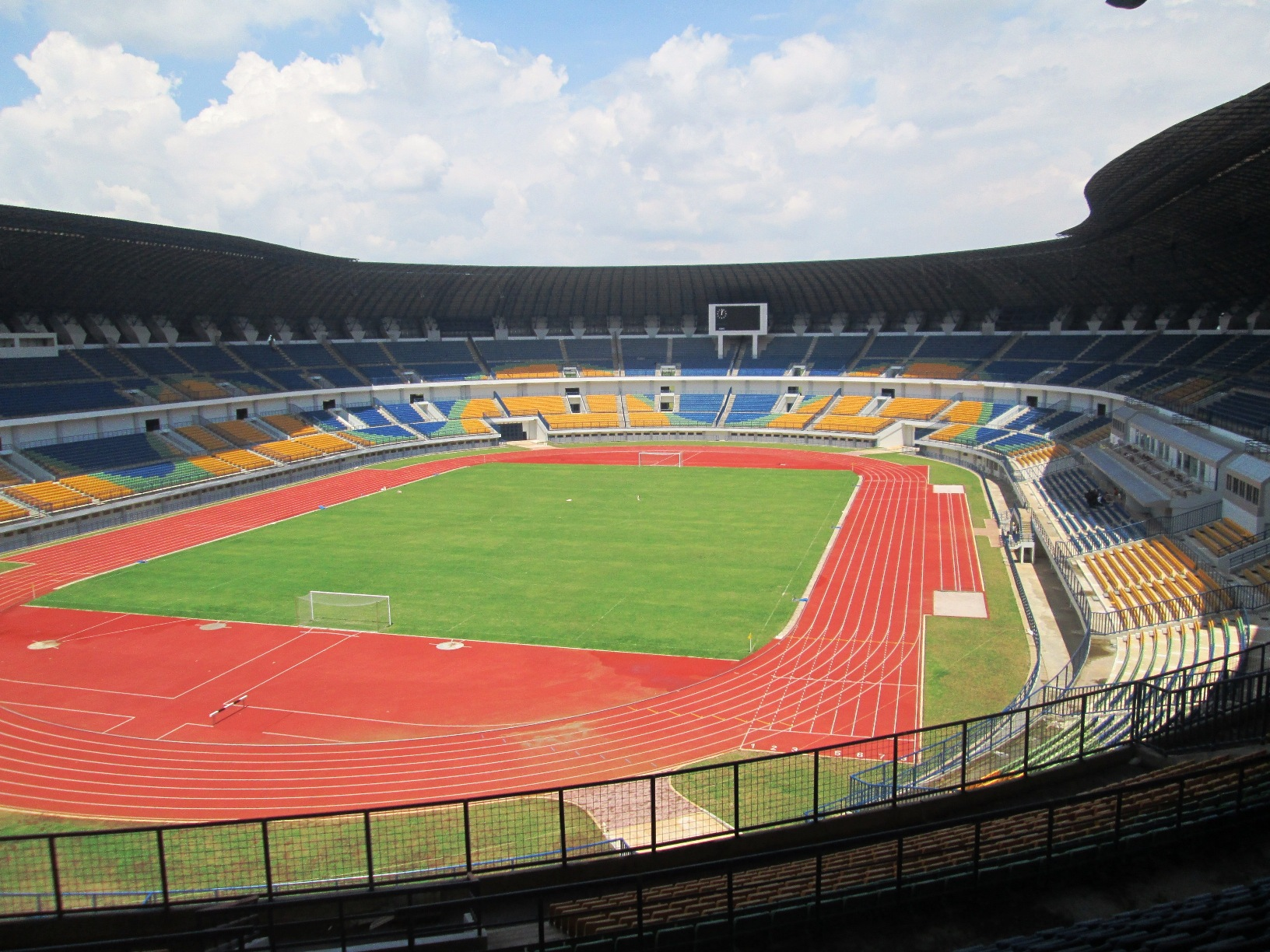
Gelora Bandung Lautan Api Stadium

=== Bandung ===
Location	Venues	Sports
Sport Jabar Arcamanik	Sand volleyball court	Beach volleyball
Sport Jabar Arcamanik	Baseball Stadium	Baseball
Sport Jabar Arcamanik	Gymnasium, Graha Laga Satria, Graha Laga Tangkas	Gymnastics
Faculty of Sports and Health Education, Indonesia University of Education	Gymnasium	Taekwondo, Indoor Hockey
Faculty of Sports and Health Education, Indonesia University of Education	Softball Stadium	Softbol (Women's Event)
Faculty of Sports and Health Education, Indonesia University of Education	Sporthall	Sepak takraw
Faculty of Sports and Health Education, Indonesia University of Education	Swimming pool	Diving, Swimming, Synchronized Swimming
Saparua Sports Complex	Saparua Sports Hall	Judo, Wrestling
Saparua Sports Complex	Saparua roller skating rinks	Roller skating
Siliwangi Sports Complex	Graha Siliwangi Billiard Arena	Cue sports
Siliwangi Sports Complex	Graha Siliwangi Squash Arena	Squash
Siliwangi Sports Complex	Graha Siliwangi Bowling Arena	Bowling
Siliwangi Sports Complex	Siliwangi Stadium	Cricket
Siliwangi Sports Complex	Siliwangi Tennis Courts dan Maluku Park	Tennis

Venue	Cabang Olahraga
Gelora Bandung Lautan Api Stadium	Opening and closing ceremony
Sasana Budaya Ganesha, Bandung Institute of Technology	Karate, Kempo
C-Tra Arena Sports Hall	Basketball
Savoy Homan Hotel	Chess
Horison Hotel	Contract bridge
Haris Hotel	Dance Sport, Fencing
Padjadjaran Sports Hall	Wushu, Tarung derajat

=== Sumedang Regency ===
Location	Venues	Sports
Bandung Institute of Technology, Jatinangor Campus	Graha Laga Satria	Pencak Silat
Bandung Institute of Technology, Jatinangor Campus	Futsal courts	Futsal
Bandung Institute of Technology, Jatinangor Campus	Sports Hall 3	Table Tennis

Venues	Sports
Batudua Hills, Lingga Mount	Hang gliding, Paragliding
Bandung Giri Gahana Golf	Golf

=== Cimahi ===
Venues	Sports
Cisangkan shooting range	Shooting
Munaip Saleh Velodrome	Track Cycling

=== Indramayu Regency ===
Venues	Sports
Tirtamaya Beach	Open water swimming, Finswimming (Long distance)
Balongan Indah Beach	Sailing

=== Pangandaran Regency ===
Venues	Sports
Cijulang Nusawiru Airport	Parachuting
Legokjawa Racecourse	Equestrian (horse racing)

=== Cirebon ===
Venues	Sports
Bima Sport Hall	Badminton
Catherine Surya Swimming pool, Bima Madya Sports Complex	Finswimming (Pool)

=== Subang Regency ===
Venues	Sports
Suryadarma Air Base	Gliding

=== Karawang Regency ===
Venues	Sports
Cipule Lake	Canoeing, Dragon boat, Rowing

=== Sukabumi Regency ===
Venues	Sports
Pelabuhan Ratu Boxing Gymnasium	Boxing

=== Bekasi ===
Venues	Sports
Patriot Stadium	Football

=== Bekasi Regency ===
Venues	Sports
Wibawa Mukti Stadium	Football

=== Bogor Regency ===
Venues	Sports
Pakansari Stadium	Athletics, Marching band, Football

=== Ciamis Regency ===
Venues	Sports
Cigembor Forest Park Circuit	BMX Cycling

=== Tasikmalaya ===
Venues	Sports
Bukit Peusar Circuit	Motorcycle racing

== The Games ==
=== Sports ===
The 2016 edition featured more sports than the previous edition. 44 sports and 12 demonstration sports will be held in various venues scattered around West Java.

- Aerosport
  - Aeromodelling (9)
  - Gliding (9)
  - Hang gliding (6)
  - Parachuting (6)
  - Paragliding (8)
- Aquatics
  - Diving (10)
  - Open water swimming (6)
  - Swimming (40)
  - Synchronized swimming (3)
  - Water polo (2)
- Archery (18)
- Athletics (47)
- Badminton (7)
- Baseball/Softball
  - Baseball (1)
  - Softball (2)
- Basketball (2)
- Bodybuilding, Powerlifting, Weightlifting
  - Bodybuilding (8)
  - Powerlifting (15)
  - Weightlifting (15)
- Bowling (11)
- Boxing (16)
- Chess (15)
- Contract bridge (5)
- Cricket (4)
- Cue sports (16)
- Cycling
  - BMX (2)
  - Mountain biking (5)
  - Road (6)
  - Track (9)
- Dancesport (15)
- Equestrian
  - Equestrian (10)
  - Horse Racing (5)
- Fencing (12)
- Finswimming
  - Long distance (6)
  - Pool (16)
- Football
  - Football (1)
  - Futsal (1)
- Gymnastics
  - Artistic gymnastics (14)
  - Rhythmic gymnastics (6)
  - Aerobic gymnastics (3)
- Golf (7)
- Hockey
  - Field hockey (2)
  - Indoor hockey (2)
- Human-powered boat racing
  - Canoeing (16)
  - Dragon boat (9)
  - Rowing (15)
- Judo (22)
- Karate (17)
- Marching band (10)
- Motorcycle racing (6)
- Pencak silat (21)
- Roller skating (16)
- Sailing (25)
- Shooting (34)
- Shorinji kempo (17)
- Sport climbing (18)
- Sepak takraw (8)
- Squash (5)
- Table tennis (7)
- Taekwondo (20)
- Tarung Derajat (17)
- Tennis (7)
- Volleyball
  - Indoor volleyball (2)
  - Beach volleyball (2)
- Waterskiing (12)
- Wrestling
  - Freestyle (17)
  - Greco-Roman (9)
- Wushu (23)

==== Demonstration Sports ====
- 3-on-3 basketball
- Lion dance
- Handball (2)
- Gateball
- Korfball
- Muay Thai
- Pétanque
- Rafting (16)
- Rugby sevens (2)
- Soft tennis
- Woodball (14)
- Yongmoodo

=== Participating Provincial Sports Committees ===
Participating Provincial Sports Committees
- Aceh
- North Sumatra
- West Sumatra
- Riau
- Riau Islands
- Jambi
- South Sumatra
- Bangka Belitung Islands
- Bengkulu
- Lampung
- Jakarta
- Banten
- West Java (host)
- Central Java
- Special Region of Yogyakarta
- East Java
- Bali
- West Nusa Tenggara
- East Nusa Tenggara
- West Kalimantan
- Central Kalimantan
- South Kalimantan
- East Kalimantan
- North Kalimantan
- North Sulawesi
- Gorontalo
- Central Sulawesi
- West Sulawesi
- South Sulawesi
- Southeast Sulawesi
- Maluku
- North Maluku
- West Papua
- Papua

=== Medal table ===
A total of 2501 medals—763 gold, 758 silver, and 980 bronze—were awarded to athletes.

* Host nation (West Java)

2016 Pekan Olahraga Nasional medal table
Rank	Province	Gold	Silver	Bronze	Total
1	West Java*	217	157	157	531
2	East Java	132	138	134	404
3	Jakarta	132	124	118	374
4	Central Java	32	56	85	173
5	East Kalimantan	25	41	73	139
6	Bali	20	21	35	76
7	Riau	18	26	27	71
8	Papua	17	19	32	68
9	North Sumatra	16	17	33	66
10	Special Region of Yogyakarta	16	16	25	57
11	West Sumatra	14	10	20	44
12	South Sulawesi	12	23	28	63
13	Banten	11	10	26	47
14	West Nusa Tenggara	11	10	18	39
15	Lampung	11	9	16	36
16	South Kalimantan	9	10	18	37
17	Aceh	8	7	9	24
18	East Nusa Tenggara	7	7	9	23
19	Riau Islands	7	4	7	18
20	Maluku	7	3	9	19
21	South Sumatra	6	11	14	31
22	West Kalimantan	6	8	16	30
23	Jambi	6	6	21	33
24	Southeast Sulawesi	6	4	4	14
25	West Papua	4	2	10	16
26	Central Kalimantan	3	4	4	11
27	North Kalimantan	3	0	3	6
28	Gorontalo	2	0	1	3
29	Bangka Belitung	1	6	4	11
30	North Maluku	1	1	2	4
31	North Sulawesi	1	0	8	9
32	Central Sulawesi	0	4	7	11
33	Bengkulu	0	2	2	4
34	West Sulawesi	0	0	1	1
Totals (34 entries)		761	756	976	2,493

=== Concerns and controversies ===
The Games were marred with controversies in the competition itself and other non-competition related aspects. At least 15 of the 44 sports contested faced problems involving unfair judging, intimidating supporters, or sudden change of rules. Boycott from other provinces also occurred in judo and synchronized swimming.

Preceded by 2012; Pekanbaru, Riau	Pekan Olahraga Nasional	Succeeded by 2020; Jayapura, Papua
