= 2021 Pekan Olahraga Nasional =

Multi-sport event in Jayapura, Indonesia

Pekan Olahraga Nasional XX
- Host city: Jayapura
- Motto: Torang Bisa! (We Can!)
- Athletes: 6,442
- Events: 56 sports
- Opening: 2 October 2021
- Closing: 15 October 2021
- Opened by: Joko Widodo; President of Indonesia
- Closed by: Ma'ruf Amin; Vice President of Indonesia
- Athlete's Oath: Maria Bonay
- Judge's Oath: Manase Opur
- Torch lighter: Boaz Solossa
- Main venue: Lukas Enembe Stadium
- Website: www.ponxx2021papua.com

The XX National Sports Week (Indonesian: Pekan Olahraga Nasional XX, abbreviated as PON XX), also called PON XX Papua or PON Papua 2021, was the twentieth edition of the Indonesian National Sports Week, hosted by Papua. The event took place from 2 October to 15 October 2021. Lukas Enembe Stadium was the main venue for this edition, both the opening and closing ceremonies. This event was originally held in 2020, but was postponed to 2021 due to COVID-19 pandemic. This edition was the first PON held in the province, as well as in the Western New Guinea region and Eastern Indonesian Time areas.

== Bids ==
Papua successfully defeated Bali and Aceh to host PON XX / 2020. Gaining the most votes in the voting for the prospective host of the National Sports Week (PON) XX in 2020 by winning 66 votes at the Annual Member Meeting of the National Sports Committee of Indonesia (KONI).

== Venues ==
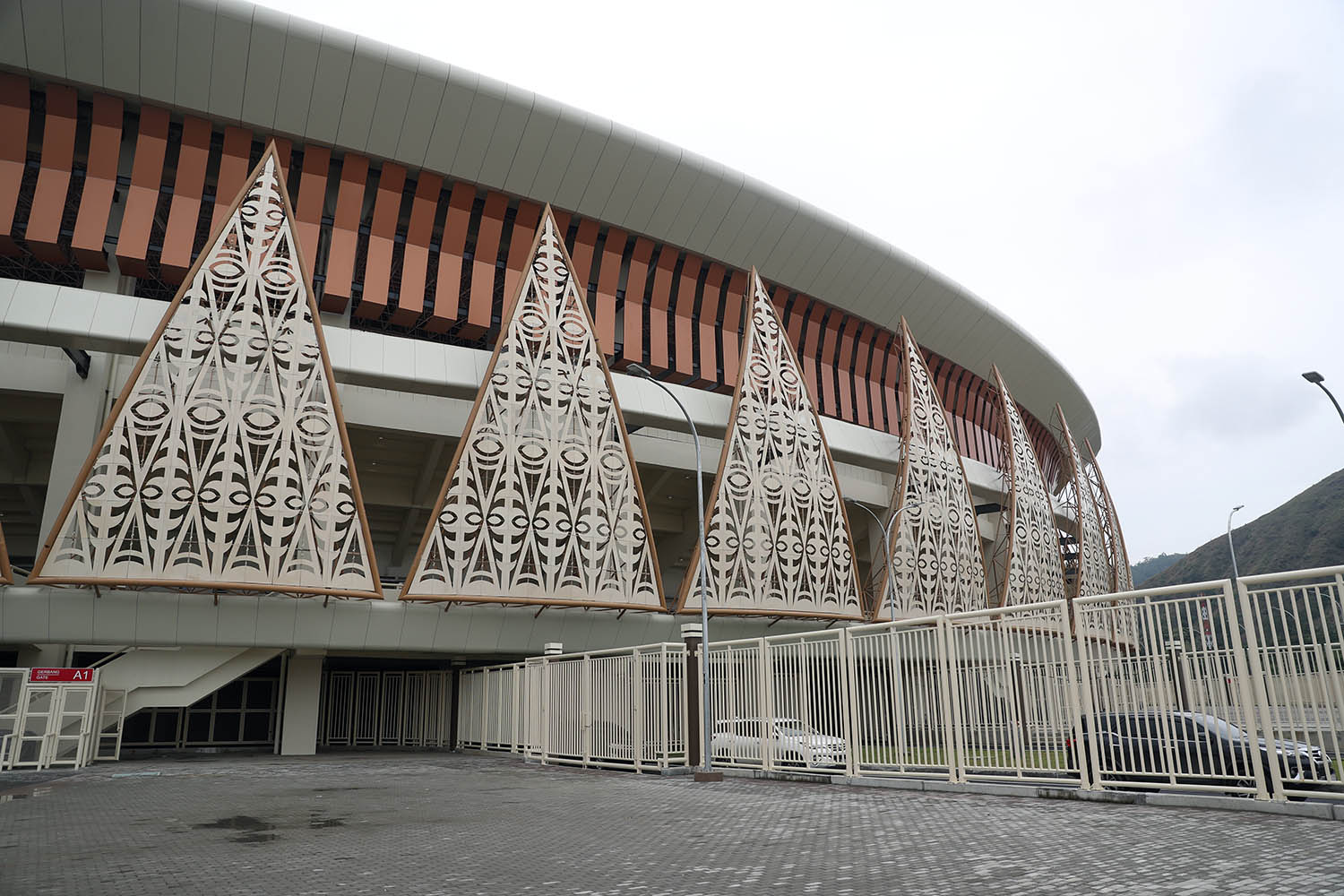
Lukas Enembe Stadium in Jayapura Regency

The PON XX venues spread in one city and three regencies on Papua Provinces: Jayapura City, Jayapura Regency, Merauke Regency, and Mimika Regency.

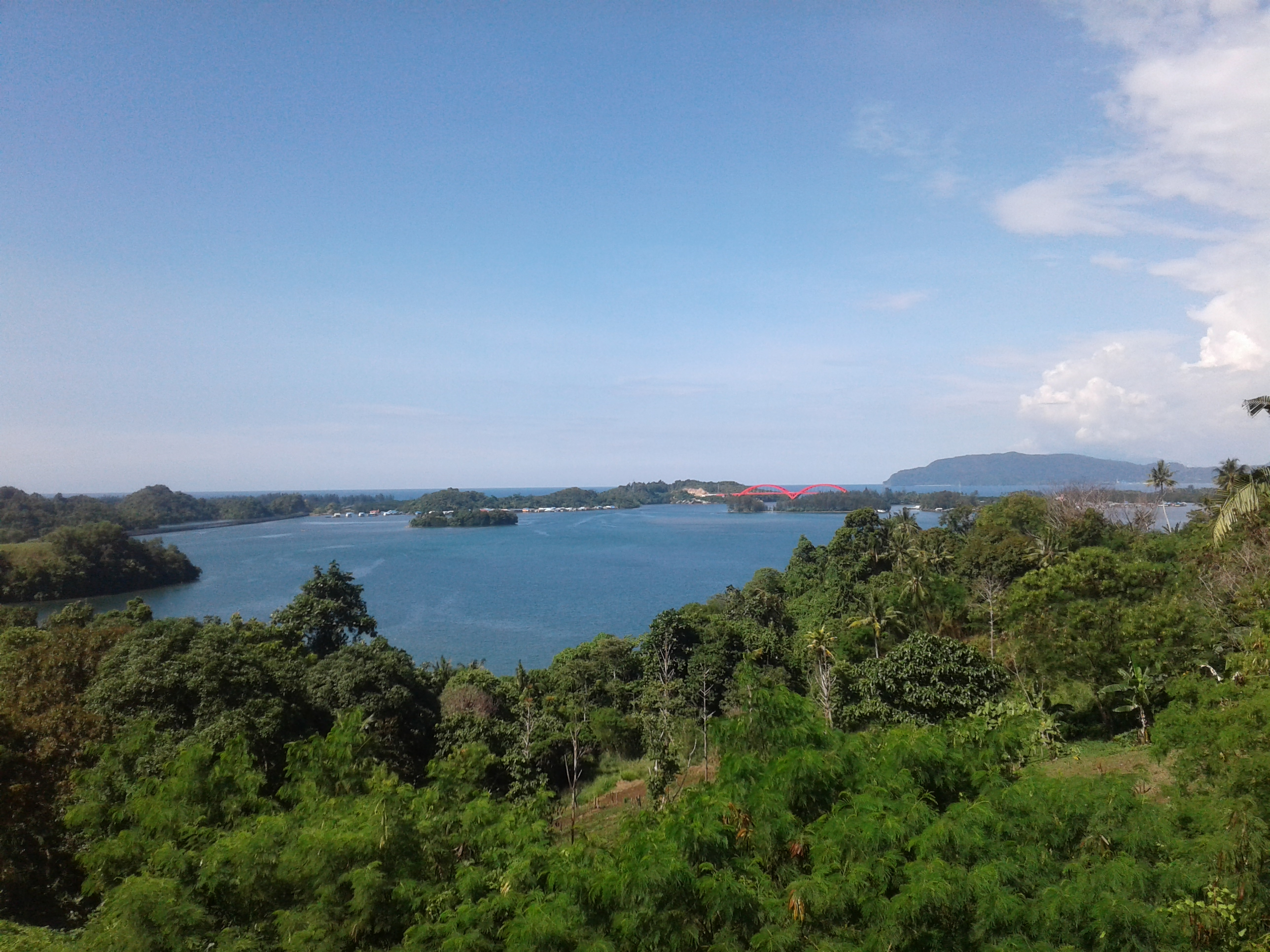
Yos Sudarso Bay

PON XX Venues
City/Regency	Venue		Sports	Capacity
Jayapura City	Koya Koso	Sports Hall	Volleyball	3.000
Jayapura City	Koya Koso	Beach Volleyball Court	Beach Volleyball	-
Jayapura City	Jayapura Mayor Office	Tennis Court	Tennis	-
Jayapura City	Kotaraja	Waringin Sports Hall	Badminton	-
Jayapura City	Politeknik Penerbangan Jayapura	Sports Hall	Karate	-
Jayapura City	Politeknik Penerbangan Jayapura	Sports Hall	Taekwondo	-
Jayapura City	Cenderawasih University	Mahacandra Stadium	Football	20.000
Jayapura City	Cenderawasih University	Auditorium	Bodybuilding	-
Jayapura City	Cenderawasih University	Auditorium	Powerlifting	-
Jayapura City	Cenderawasih University	Auditorium	Weightlifting	-
Jayapura City	Cenderawasih University	Softball Field	Softball	2.000
Jayapura City	Cenderawasih University	Trikora Sports Hall	Sepak takraw	-
Jayapura City	Cenderawasih University	Cenderawasih Sports Hall	Boxing	1.481
Jayapura City	Waena	Roller skating Arena	Roller skating	-
Jayapura City	Waena	Cendrawasih Campsite	Paralayang	-
Jayapura City	Mandala Stadium		Football	20.000
Jayapura City	Yos Sudarso Bay		Open water swimming	-
Jayapura City	Yos Sudarso Bay		Underwater diving (sea)	-
Jayapura City	Youtefa Bay		Canoeing	-
Jayapura City	Youtefa Bay		Dragon boat	-
Jayapura City	Youtefa Bay		Rowing	-
Jayapura City	Hamadi Beach, Indonesian Navy Complex		Sailing	-
Jayapura Regency	Lukas Enembe Sports Complex	Lukas Enembe Stadium	Opening and closing ceremonies	40.623
Jayapura Regency	Lukas Enembe Sports Complex	Istora	Gymnastics (artistic, aerobic, rhythmic)	3.000
Jayapura Regency	Lukas Enembe Sports Complex	Aquatics stadium	Aquatics (diving, water polo, swimming, artistic swimming)	1.723
Jayapura Regency	Lukas Enembe Sports Complex	Aquatics stadium	Underwater diving (pool)	1.723
Jayapura Regency	Lukas Enembe Sports Complex	Shooting range	Shooting	-
Jayapura Regency	Doyo Baru Sports Complex	Indoor Hockey field	Hockey (indoor)	-
Jayapura Regency	Doyo Baru Sports Complex	Outdoor Hockey field	Hockey (field)	1.900
Jayapura Regency	Doyo Baru Sports Complex	Cricket field	Cricket	1.700
Jayapura Regency	Indonesian Air Force Complex, Sentani	Baseball field	Baseball (preliminary & final)	500
Jayapura Regency	Indonesian Air Force Complex, Sentani	Softball field	Softball (women's)	500
Jayapura Regency	Indonesian Air Force Complex, Sentani	Shooting range	Shooting	-
Jayapura Regency	Indonesian Air Force Complex, Sentani	Rugby field	Rugby 7's	-
Jayapura Regency	Kingmi Complex, Kampung Harapan	Archery Field	Archery	-
Jayapura Regency	Barnabas Youwe Stadium		Football	15.000
Jayapura Regency	Rudy Resnawan Sports Hall		Sepak Takraw	-
Jayapura Regency	STT Gidi Sentani Sports Hall		Kenpō	3.000
Jayapura Regency	STT Gidi Sentani Sports Hall		Muaythai	3.000
Jayapura Regency	Toware Sports Hall		Pencak silat	-
Jayapura Regency	Advent Airfield, Doyo Baru		Hang gliding	-
Mimika Regency	Mimika Sports Complex	Athletics stadium	Athletics (marathon & racewalking)	950
Mimika Regency	Mimika Sports Complex	Basketball hall	Basketball	4.000
Mimika Regency	Mimika Sports Complex	Basketball hall	3x3 basketball	4.000
Mimika Regency	Mimika Sports Complex	Billiard hall	Cue sports	-
Mimika Regency	Mimika Sports Complex	Sport climbing arena	Sport climbing	-
Mimika Regency	Mimika Sports Complex	Futsal hall	Futsal	-
Mimika Regency	Mimika Sports Complex	Futsal hall	Handball	-
Mimika Regency	Mimika Sports Complex	SP1 & SP5 Pitch	Football (women's)	-
Mimika Regency	Mimika Regent Office	Ceremonial field	Paragliding	-
Mimika Regency	Yohanis Kapiyau Airbase		Aeromodelling	-
Mimika Regency	Yohanis Kapiyau Airbase		Gliding	-
Mimika Regency	Eme Neme Yauware Sports Hall		Judo	-
Mimika Regency	Eme Neme Yauware Sports Hall		Tarung Derajat	-
Merauke Regency	Katalpal Stadium		Football	10.000
Merauke Regency	Futsal Hall, Merauke Regencies Sports and Youth office		Wushu	-
Merauke Regency	Futsal Hall, Merauke Regencies Sports and Youth office		Wrestling	-
Merauke Regency	Tanah Miring Circuit		Motorcycle racing (road race & motor cross)	-
Merauke Regency	Archelaus Lai		Fencing	-
Merauke Regency	Swiss-Belhotel Merauke Ballroom		Chess	-

== Games ==
=== Sports ===
The 2020 edition featured more sports than the previous edition. Based on KONI Decree No. 100 of 2019, a total of 56 sports were competed in the games. Previously, the central KONI determined a number of 47 sports to be competed, but returned later to 56 according to the hosts ability. Ten sports that were removed were cycling, bridge, dance, gateball, golf, petanque, water skiing, soft tennis, table tennis and woodball. Meanwhile, electronic sports are also competed as an exhibition sport.

- Aerosport
  - Aeromodelling (9)
  - Gliding (9)
  - Hang gliding (6)
  - Parachuting (6)
  - Paragliding (8)
- Aquatics
  - Diving (10)
  - Open water swimming (6)
  - Swimming (40)
  - Synchronized swimming (3)
  - Water polo (2)
- Archery (18)
- Athletics (46)
- Badminton (7)
- Baseball/Softball
  - Baseball (1)
  - Softball (2)
- Basketball
  - Basketball (2)
  - 3x3 basketball (2)
- Bodybuilding, Powerlifting, Weightlifting
  - Bodybuilding
  - Powerlifting
  - Weightlifting
- Bowling
- Boxing
- Chess (15)
- Cricket (4)
- Cue sports (20)
- Fencing
- Football
  - Football (2)
  - Futsal (1)
- Gymnastics
  - Artistic gymnastics
  - Rhythmic gymnastics
  - Aerobic gymnastics
- Hockey
  - Field hockey (2)
  - Indoor hockey (2)
- Handball (2)
- Kenpō (17)
- Human-powered boat racing
  - Canoeing (16)
  - Dragon boat (9)
  - Rowing (15)
- Rugby sevens
- Muaythai (18)
- Motorcycle (8)
- Pencak silat (21)
- Roller skating (16)
- Sailing (25)
- Shooting (34)
- Sport climbing (18)
- Sepak takraw (8)
- Taekwondo (20)
- Tarung Derajat (17)
- Tennis (7)
- Underwater diving (28)
  - Pool
  - Sea
- Volleyball
  - Indoor volleyball (2)
  - Beach volleyball (2)
- Wrestling
  - Freestyle (17)
  - Greco-Roman (9)
- Wushu (23)

=== Participating Provincial Sports Committees ===
Participating Provincial Sports Committees
- Aceh (128)
- Bali (237)
- Banten (269)
- Bengkulu (46)
- Special Region of Yogyakarta (130)
- Jakarta (400)
- Gorontalo (16)
- Jambi (122)
- West Java (400)
- Central Java (400)
- East Java (400)
- West Kalimantan (67)
- South Kalimantan (123)
- Central Kalimantan (128)
- East Kalimantan (368)
- North Kalimantan (31)
- Bangka Belitung Islands (78)
- Riau Islands (51)
- Lampung (138)
- Maluku (42)
- North Maluku (52)
- West Nusa Tenggara (106)
- East Nusa Tenggara (89)
- Papua (400) (host)
- West Papua (259)
- Riau (182)
- West Sulawesi (32)
- South Sulawesi (230)
- Central Sulawesi (60)
- Southeast Sulawesi (106)
- North Sulawesi (121)
- West Sumatra (195)
- South Sumatra (102)
- North Sumatra (186)

=== Medal table ===
A total of 2212 medals—688 gold, 675 silver, and 849 bronze—were awarded to athletes.

* Host nation (Papua)

2021 Pekan Olahraga Nasional medal table
Rank	Province	Gold	Silver	Bronze	Total
1	West Java	133	105	115	353
2	Jakarta	111	91	99	301
3	East Java	110	89	88	287
4	Papua*	93	66	102	261
5	Bali	28	25	53	106
6	Central Java	27	47	64	138
7	East Kalimantan	25	33	42	100
8	Riau	21	25	21	67
9	West Nusa Tenggara	15	11	12	38
10	Lampung	14	10	12	36
11	South Sulawesi	11	13	13	37
12	Aceh	11	7	11	29
13	North Sumatra	10	22	23	55
14	Banten	10	5	26	41
15	Special Region of Yogyakarta	8	12	18	38
15	West Sumatra	8	12	18	38
17	South Sumatra	8	4	17	29
18	Jambi	6	10	13	29
19	East Nusa Tenggara	5	10	9	24
20	Southeast Sulawesi	5	5	5	15
21	Maluku	5	4	6	15
22	South Kalimantan	4	9	12	25
23	North Sulawesi	4	6	11	21
24	West Papua	3	14	15	32
25	West Kalimantan	3	5	6	14
26	Central Kalimantan	2	6	5	13
27	Riau Islands	2	5	4	11
28	Gorontalo	2	1	2	5
29	Central Sulawesi	1	5	6	12
30	Bengkulu	1	4	7	12
31	Bangka Belitung	1	2	8	11
32	North Kalimantan	1	1	2	4
33	North Maluku	0	0	3	3
34	West Sulawesi	0	0	2	2
Totals (34 entries)		688	664	850	2,202

Preceded by 2016; Bandung, West Java	Pekan Olahraga Nasional	Succeeded by 2024; Aceh-North Sumatra
