= Carl Sugianto =

Indonesian weightlifter

Giam Djie Kwie "Carl" Sugianto (October 28, 1923 – November 5, 2001) was an Indonesian weightlifter. He participated in the first Indonesian National Games, Pekan Olahraga Nasional, held in 1948 in Surakarta, where he won the gold medal. He then won gold medals in the next four Indonesian national weightlifting championships.

== Early life ==
Carl was born in Bandung, West Java, Dutch East Indies the thirteenth child of Giam Lian Tie and Tang Hok Tjoe, a prominent local businessman. During his teenage days, he joined a local, but well known sporting club called Aurora Bandung; later to be renamed Health & Strength Association Bandung. He is to live in Bandung for his entire life.

== Career ==
During the 1930s, weightlifting as a sport Indonesia was still at its preliminary stages. No set rules were existent, and it was a show of strength more than techniques. Different methods were allowed as opposed to the modern clean and jerk. Athletes trained at home with their own equipment, and techniques were learned by the exchange of ideas between the athletic community instead of a coach. H&S Bandung, the club he joined revolutionized sporting clubs in Indonesia with creation of a system, similar to that of modern athletic clubs. Coaches were employed and a regulated training schedule was established. As for this reason, he trained consistently using the clean and jerk method and had an advantage over his opponents. During the first PON games, weightlifting was standardized using a score system, and employed judges. Carl won due to his perfection of technique that he consistently trained during his early years as an amateur weightlifter. No classification system was established at the time, so that there would be one ultimate medal for this event. He would then win the next four gold medals at the next four PON games.

== Personal life ==
Carl was a family man as much as he was an athlete. He is married to Kwie Kim Hwie, a woman he had met and gotten to know through a friend he met at a championship event. They remained married for 52 years until Carl's death in 2001. Carl had four children whom he raised as devout Christians. His eldest daughter is Mayke Tedjasaputra, a prominent psychologist in Indonesia.

For the duration of his life, Carl had been and remained a devout Christian. He attended the local Indonesia Christian Church, Kebon Jati, Bandung. Upon his death, his favourite passage of Psalm 23 was used in his funeral mass.
