= 2004 Pekan Olahraga Nasional =

Indonesian 16th National Sports Week

Pekan Olahraga Nasional XVI
- Host city: Palembang, South Sumatra
- Motto: Bersatu teguh (Firmly united)
- Athletes: 5,660
- Events: 607 in 41 sports
- Opening: 2 September
- Closing: 14 September
- Opened by: Megawati Sukarnoputri; President of Indonesia
- Torch lighter: Ridwan Gunawan
- Ceremony venue: Gelora Sriwijaya Stadium, Palembang

2004 Pekan Olahraga Nasional or the Pekan Olahraga Nasional XVI were a major multi-sport event in Indonesia which took place in Palembang, South Sumatra, from 2 September to 14 September 2004. A total of 607 events in 41 sports were competed among more than 5,500 athletes from 30 provinces, with the newly created province of Riau Islands only as observer and did not send any athletes. The games also staged 8 paralympic sports.

Jakarta topped the medal table for the tenth time in the history of the games.

== Sports ==
- Aerospace games
- Aquatics
  - Diving
  - Swimming
  - Synchronized swimming
  - Water polo
- Archery
- Athletics
- Badminton
- Basketball
- Billiards
- Bowling
- Boxing
- Chess
- Climbing
- Contract bridge
- Cycling
- Fencing
- Football
- Golf
- Gymnastics
  - Artistic
  - Rhythmic
  - Aerobic
- Hockey
- Judo
- Karate
- Kenpo
- Pencak silat
- Motorcycling
- Roller skating
- Rowing
- Sailing
- Sepak takraw
- Shooting
- Squash
- Table tennis
- Taekwondo
- Tarung Derajat
- Tennis
- Volleyball
  - Indoor
  - Beach
- Water skiing
- Weightlifting
- Wrestling
- Wushu

== Medal table ==
2004 Pekan Olahraga Nasional medal table
Rank	Province	Gold	Silver	Bronze	Total
1	Jakarta	141	111	114	366
2	East Java	77	81	111	269
3	West Java	76	79	94	249
4	Central Java	56	59	64	179
5	South Sumatra	30	41	40	111
6	Jambi	27	28	15	70
7	Papua	23	13	19	55
8	Lampung	22	21	21	64
9	East Kalimantan	19	28	33	80
10	South Sulawesi	17	22	19	58
11	Riau	16	14	20	50
12	North Sumatra	15	15	26	56
13	North Sulawesi	14	14	13	41
14	Bali	11	12	18	41
15	Yogyakarta	10	13	21	44
16	South Kalimantan	10	12	10	32
17	Southeast Sulawesi	9	6	9	24
18	West Kalimantan	8	8	14	30
19	East Nusa Tenggara	8	4	4	16
20	Banten	7	9	31	47
21	West Sumatra	6	10	25	41
22	Aceh	6	2	5	13
23	West Nusa Tenggara	5	5	11	21
24	Central Kalimantan	5	3	15	23
25	Maluku	3	2	5	10
26	Bangka Belitung	2	4	6	12
27	Central Sulawesi	1	5	4	10
28	Bengkulu	1	4	6	11
29	North Maluku	0	0	4	4
30	Gorontalo	0	0	3	3
Total		625	625	780	2030

Preceded by 2000; Surabaya, East Java	Pekan Olahraga Nasional	Succeeded by 2008; Samarinda, East Kalimantan
