= Table tennis at the 2016 Pekan Olahraga Nasional =

Table tennis competitions at the 2016 Pekan Olahraga Nasional were held between 22 September and 28 September at ITB Jatinangor, Sumedang Regency, West Java, Indonesia.

== Schedule ==
Q	First Round	¼	Quarterfinal	½	Semifinal	F	Final

September	Thu 22	Fri 23		Sat 24		Sun 25	Mon 26		Tue 27	Wed 28	
Men's Team	Q	Q	¼	½	F						
Women's Team	Q	Q		½	F						
Men's Single									Q	½	F
Women's Single									Q	½	F
Men's Double						Q	½	F			
Women's Double						Q	½	F			
Mix Double						Q	½	F			

== Medalists ==
Nomor	Gold	Silver	Bronze
Men's single	Ficky Supit Santoso; East Java	Akhmad Dahlan Haruri; West Java	Yulius Dwi Cahya Kusuma; East Java
Men's single	Ficky Supit Santoso; East Java	Akhmad Dahlan Haruri; West Java	M. Gilang Maulana; West Java
Men's double	West Java; Yon Mardiono; Akhmad Dahlan Haruri	West Java; M. Gilang Maulana; M. Bima Abdi Negara	South Kalimantan; Gilang Ramadhan; Donald Jechson Paleba
Men's double	West Java; Yon Mardiono; Akhmad Dahlan Haruri	West Java; M. Gilang Maulana; M. Bima Abdi Negara	East Java; Ficky Supit Santoso; Muhammad Hussein
Men's Team	West Java; M. Gilang Maulana; Yon Mardiono; Akhmad Dahlan Haruri	East Java; Ficky Supit Santoso; Muhammad Hussein; Yulius Dwi Cahya Kusuma	Jambi; Triono Poiyo; Dennis Darmawan; Momon Afrimon
Men's Team	West Java; M. Gilang Maulana; Yon Mardiono; Akhmad Dahlan Haruri	East Java; Ficky Supit Santoso; Muhammad Hussein; Yulius Dwi Cahya Kusuma	Jakarta; Rocky Christfel Eman; Dian David Mickael Jacobs; Bagus Aji Saputra
Women's single	Christine Ferliana; East Java	Widya Wulansari; East Java	Silir Rovani; East Java
Women's single	Christine Ferliana; East Java	Widya Wulansari; East Java	Noor Azizah Dwi Agustin; East Java
Women's double	Jakarta; Stella Frisca Palit; Desi Ramadanti	Jakarta; Mira Fitria; Rina Sintya	Central Java; Ceria Nilasari; Lilis Indriani
Women's double	Jakarta; Stella Frisca Palit; Desi Ramadanti	Jakarta; Mira Fitria; Rina Sintya	Papua; Novianti Chandra; Ling Ling Agustin
Women's Team	Jakarta; Rina Sintya; Stella Frisca Palit; Mira Fitria	East Java; Noor Azizah Dwi Agustin; Christine Ferliana; Silir Rovani	West Java; Kharisma Nur Hawwa; Nuni Sugiani; Alda Rahayu Candra
Women's Team	Jakarta; Rina Sintya; Stella Frisca Palit; Mira Fitria	East Java; Noor Azizah Dwi Agustin; Christine Ferliana; Silir Rovani	Papua; Novianti Chandra; Ling Ling Agustin; Nurniawati Mananu
Mix double	Jakarta; Dian David Mickael Jacobs; Mira Fitria	West Java; Yon Mardiono; Nuni Sugiani	Jakarta; Bagus Aji Saputra; Rina Sintya
Mix double	Jakarta; Dian David Mickael Jacobs; Mira Fitria	West Java; Yon Mardiono; Nuni Sugiani	East Java; Muhammad Hussein; Christine Ferliana

== Medal table ==
Host

1	Jakarta	3	1	2	6
2	East Java	2	3	5	10
3	West Java	2	3	2	7
4	Papua	0	0	2	2
5	Jambi	0	0	1	1
5	Central Java	0	0	1	1
5	South Kalimantan	0	0	1	1
Total		7	7	14	28
