= Gymnastics at the 2016 Pekan Olahraga Nasional =

Gymnastics competitions at the 2016 Pekan Olahraga Nasional were held between 20 September and 27 September at GOR Arcamanik, Bandung, West Java, Indonesia. A total of 136 athletes from 22 provinces competed in 24 events.

== Qualification ==
Qualification for 24 competition classes were contested at the Gymnastics National Championships 2015 which were held from 28 October to 5 November 2015 at Arcamanik Gymnasium Center, Bandung, West Java. A total of 136 athletes from 22 provinces competed in 24 events.

== Medalists ==
=== Aerobics ===
Nomor	Gold	Silver	Bronze
Men's single	Claudio Marsello; Jakarta	Raja Dwi Permata Halim; East Java	Denda Firmansyah; Lampung
Women's single	Tyana Dewi Koesumawati; Jakarta	Umi Sri Haryani; Lampung	Della Rosa A. Purbowo; East Java
Mix couple	Jakarta; Lody Lontoh; Tyana Dewi Koesumawati	Lampung; Denda Firmansyah; Umi Sri Haryani	East Java; Raja Dwi Permata Halim; Della Rosa A. Purbowo

=== Artistic gymnastics ===
==== Men's ====
Nomor	Gold	Silver	Bronze
Team all-around	East Java; Muhammad Tri Saputra; Ferrous One Willyodac; Dwi Samsul Arifin; Agus Adi Prayoko	Riau; Agung Sucitantio Akbar; M. Afrizal; Doni Pratama; Wahyu Afandi	South Sulawesi; Audi Ashari Arif; Rycki Saputra Hasan; Rifcha Saputra Hasan; Duhri Tryan Nurhadi Arif
Individual all-around	Muhammad Tri Saputra; East Java	Agung Sucitantio Akbar; Riau	Audi Ashari Arif; South Sulawesi
Floor exercise	Ferrous One Willyodac; East Java	Dwi Samsul Arifin; East Java	Timotius Avent Jordan; West Java
Floor exercise	Ferrous One Willyodac; East Java	Dwi Samsul Arifin; East Java	Doni Pratama; Riau
Pommel horse	Muhammad Tri Saputra; East Java	Agung Sucitantio Akbar; Riau	Yuridhistira Alfian Setiadi; Lampung
Rings	Dwi Samsul Arifin; East Java	-	Agus Adi Prayoko; East Java
Rings	M Afrisal; Riau	-	Agus Adi Prayoko; East Java
Vault	Agus Adi Prayoko; East Java	Dwi Samsul Arifin; East Java	Rino Effendi; West Sumatra
Parallel bars	Meiyusi Ade Putra; Lampung	Muhammad Tri Saputra; East Java	-
Parallel bars	Meiyusi Ade Putra; Lampung	Timotius Avent Jordan; West Java	-
Horizontal bar	Ferrous One Willyodac; East Java	Agung Sucitantio Akbar; Riau	Fajar Abdul Rohman; South Sumatra

==== Women's ====
Nomor	Gold	Silver	Bronze
Team all-around	East Java; Amalia Fauziah; Dewi Prahara; Tasza Miranda Devira; Bella Sindi Aurella	Jakarta; Rifda Irfanaluthfi; Amartiani; Ade Novia; Adinda Zelbie	West Java; Melly Mulyani; Fajria Destiana; Irene Cahya Anggraeni; Beby Pelany Pravity
Individual all-around	Rifda Irfanaluthfi; Jakarta	Amalia Fauziah; East Java	Dewi Prahara; East Java
Vault	Rifda Irfanaluthfi; Jakarta	Dewi Prahara; East Java	Beby Pelany Pravity; West Java
Uneven bars	Nefi Nurbaeti; East Kalimantan	Dewi Prahara; East Java	Novia Nabila Putri; East Kalimantan
Balance beam	Tasza Miranda Devira; East Java	Amalia Fauziah; East Java	Amartiani; Jakarta
Floor exercise	Rifda Irfanaluthfi; Jakarta	Amalia Fauziah; East Java	Tasza Miranda Devira; East Java

==== Rhythmic gymnastics ====
Nomor	Gold	Silver	Bronze
Group all-around	Jakarta; Dinda Defriana; Nabila Evandestiera; Carla Febri; Sortauli Dara	East Java; Rozanha Gozanah; Sinta Ernawati; Alwiah Islamiah; Ajeng Putri Pratiwi	West Java; Fanny Fauziah; Celine Marcellia; Triana Putri Amalia; Wira Alkiana Darona M.
Individual all-around	Nabila Evandestiera; Jakarta	Dinda Defriana; Jakarta	Sinta Ernawati; East Java
Hoop	Nabila Evandestiera; Jakarta	Carla Febri; Jakarta	Rozanha Gozanah; East Java
Ball	Nabila Evandestiera; Jakarta	Sortauli Dara; Jakarta	Sinta Ernawati; East Java
Clubs	Dinda Defriana; Jakarta	Sortauli Dara; Jakarta	Ajeng Putri Pratiwi; East Java
Ribbon	Dinda Defriana; Jakarta	Sinta Ernawati; East Java	Carla Febri; Jakarta

== Medal table ==
Host

1	Jakarta	12	5	2	19
2	East Java	9	11	9	29
3	Riau	1	4	1	6
4	Lampung	1	2	2	5
5	East Kalimantan	1	0	1	2
6	West Java	0	1	4	5
7	South Sulawesi	0	0	2	2
8	West Sumatra	0	0	1	1
8	South Sumatra	0	0	1	1
Total		24	23	23	70
