= Chess at the 2021 Pekan Olahraga Nasional =

Chess tournaments in Merauke, Indonesia

- Venue: Hotel Swiss Bell, Merauke
- Dates: 4–13 October 2021

Chess tournaments at the 2021 Pekan Olahraga Nasional were held between 4 October to 13 October in Hotel Swiss Bell, Merauke. 100 chess players from 23 provinces participated in events that are divided into three categories: blitz chess, rapid chess, and standard chess. Each category is composed of five events: men's team, women's team, men's individual, women's individual, and limited individual. The limited individual event is a new event for chess player ages over the age of 60.

== Medal summary ==
=== Medal table ===
Rank	Province	Gold	Silver	Bronze	Total
1	West Java	6	3	2	11
2	Papua*	2	3	2	7
3	East Kalimantan	2	1	0	3
4	Special Region of Yogyakarta	2	0	1	3
5	Jakarta	1	3	3	7
6	East Java	1	2	1	4
7	Banten	1	0	2	3
8	Central Kalimantan	0	1	2	3
9	Bali	0	1	0	1
9	West Papua	0	1	0	1
11	Central Java	0	0	1	1
11	Riau	0	0	1	1
Totals (12 entries)		15	15	15	45

Note: "*" labels the host province

Source: PON XX Papua 2021 official website

=== Medalists ===
==== Men's events ====
Nomor	Gold	Silver	Bronze
Limited individual standard	Cerdas Barus; Papua	Syarif Mahmud; Jakarta	Danny Juswanto; Banten
Limited individual rapid	Cerdas Barus; Papua	Hanny Marentek; West Papua	Danny Juswanto; Banten
Limited individual blitz	Danny Juswanto; Banten	Ronny Gunawan; East Java	Syarif Hidayat; West Java
Open individual standard	Muhammad Kahfi Maulana; Special Region of Yogyakarta	Yoseph Theolifus Taher; Papua	Arif Abdul Hafiz; West Java
Open individual rapid	Muhammad Kahfi Maulana; Special Region of Yogyakarta	Okto Dami; Bali	Yoseph Theolifus Taher; Papua
Open individual blitz	Arif Abdul Hafiz; West Java	Yoseph Theolifus Taher; Papua	Muhammad Kahfi Maulana; Special Region of Yogyakarta
Team standard	West Java; Anjas Novita; Farid Firmansyah; Muhammad Lutfi Ali; Susanto Megaranto	Central Kalimantan; Gelar Sagara Dwitama; Imat Suhermat; Muhammad Ivan Situru; Surya Wahyudi	Papua; Agus Sugianto; Albert Jefri Mebri; Reza Fajar Nugraha; Tommy Supriyanto
Team rapid	Jakarta; Azarya Jodi Setiyaki; Novendra Priasmoro; Sean Winshand Cuhendi; Syarif Mahmud	West Java; Anjas Novita; Farid Firmansyah; Muhammad Lutfi Ali; Susanto Megaranto	Riau; Achmad Bachtiar; Asrul Hidayat; Jhon Roy Damanik; Nelson Roganda
Team blitz	West Java; Anjas Novita; Farid Firmansyah; Muhammad Lutfi Ali; Susanto Megaranto	Jakarta; Azarya Jodi Setiyaki; Novendra Priasmoro; Sean Winshand Cuhendi; Syarif Mahmud	East Java; Catur Adi Sagita; Mohamad Ervan; Muhamad Agus Kurniawan; Pitra Andika

==== Women's events ====
Event	Gold	Silver	Bronze
Individual standard	Irene Kharisma Sukandar; West Java	Chelsie Monica Ignesias Sihite; East Kalimantan	Regita Desyari Putri; Central Kalimantan
Individual rapid	Chelsie Monica Ignesias Sihite; East Kalimantan	Irene Kharisma Sukandar; West Java	Regita Desyari Putri; Central Kalimantan
Individual blitz	Chelsie Monica Ignesias Sihite; East Kalimantan	Irene Kharisma Sukandar; West Java	Theodora Walukow; Jakarta
Team standard	West Java; Dewi Ardhiani Anastasia Citra; Diajeng Theresa Singgih; Medina Warda Aulia	Papua; Baiq Vina Lestari; Ivana Maria Treopolsa Lasama; Rida Mutiani	Jakarta; Khadijah Quratain; Parahita Millyena Legowo; Ummi Fisabilillah
Team rapid	West Java; Dewi Ardhiani Anastasia Citra; Diajeng Theresa Singgih; Medina Warda Aulia	East Java; Aay Aisyah Anisa; Fariha Mariroh; Nadya Anggraini Mukmin	Jakarta; Khadijah Quratain; Parahita Millyena Legowo; Ummi Fisabilillah
Team blitz	East Java; Aay Aisyah Anisa; Fariha Mariroh; Nadya Anggraini Mukmin	Jakarta; Khadijah Quratain; Parahita Millyena Legowo; Ummi Fisabilillah	Central Java; Angel Ruth Nugroho; Shanti Nur Abidah; Zahra Chumaira Amelia Hanfin

Source: PON XX Papua 2021 official website
