= Badminton at the 2016 Pekan Olahraga Nasional =

Tournament details
- Dates: 19–28 October 2016
- Venue: GOR Bima
- Location: Cirebon, Indonesia

Badminton competitions at the 2016 Pekan Olahraga Nasional were held between 19 September and 28 September at GOR Bima, Cirebon, West Java, Indonesia. A total of 87 athletes from 17 provinces participated. In this edition, athletes who can participate are limited to a maximum birth of 1991.

== Qualification ==
A total of 87 athletes from 17 provinces participated.

Province	Men's	Women's	Total
Bali		3	3
Banten	8	8	16
Special Region of Yogyakarta	3		3
Jakarta	8	8	16
Jambi	3		3
West Java	8	8	16
Central Java	8	8	16
East Java	8	8	16
East Kalimantan	3	8	11
Lampung		3	3
Riau		3	3
South Sulawesi	8	8	16
Southeast Sulawesi	3	3	6
North Sulawesi	8	3	11
West Sumatra	3		3
South Sumatra	8	8	16
North Sumatra	8	8	16
Total (17 Province)	87	87	174

== Medalists ==
Nomor	Gold	Silver	Bronze
Men's single	Jakarta; Jonatan Christie	East Java; Wisnu Yuli Prasetyo	West Java; Anthony Sinisuka Ginting
Men's single	Jakarta; Jonatan Christie	East Java; Wisnu Yuli Prasetyo	Central Java; Ihsan Maulana Mustofa
Men's double	Jakarta; Angga Pratama; Marcus Fernaldi Gideon	Central Java; Kenas Adi Haryanto; Praveen Jordan	West Java; Berry Anggriawan; Hardianto
Men's double	Jakarta; Angga Pratama; Marcus Fernaldi Gideon	Central Java; Kenas Adi Haryanto; Praveen Jordan	West Java; Fajar Alfian; Ricky Karanda Suwardi
Men's Team	West Java; Anthony Sinisuka Ginting; Berry Angriawan; Fajar Alfian; Firman Abdul Kholik; Hardianto; Hidayat Setiawan; Ricky Karanda Suwardi; Setyaldi Putra Wibowo	Central Java; Ihsan Maulana Mustofa; Kenas Adi Haryanto; Lukhi Apri Nugroho; Praveen Jordan; Reksy Aureza Megananda; Riyanto Subagja; Shesar Hiren Rhustavito; Tedi Supriadi	Jakarta; Angga Pratama; Chico Aura Dwi Wardoyo; Evert Sukamta; Fikri Ihsandi Hadmadi; Hafiz Faisal; Jonatan Christie; Marcus Fernaldi Gideon; Wahyu Nayaka Arya
Men's Team	West Java; Anthony Sinisuka Ginting; Berry Angriawan; Fajar Alfian; Firman Abdul Kholik; Hardianto; Hidayat Setiawan; Ricky Karanda Suwardi; Setyaldi Putra Wibowo	Central Java; Ihsan Maulana Mustofa; Kenas Adi Haryanto; Lukhi Apri Nugroho; Praveen Jordan; Reksy Aureza Megananda; Riyanto Subagja; Shesar Hiren Rhustavito; Tedi Supriadi	East Java; Edi Subaktiar; I Putu Roy Danu Wirya; Kevin Sanjaya Sukamuljo; Krishna Adi Nugraha; Wisnu Yuli Prasetyo; Riky Widianto; Ronald Alexander; Thomi Azizan Mahbub
Women's single	Jakarta; Fitriani	West Java; Hanna Ramadini	West Java; Gregoria Mariska Tunjung
Women's single	Jakarta; Fitriani	West Java; Hanna Ramadini	Central Java; Dinar Dyah Ayustine
Women's double	Jakarta; Anggia Shitta Awanda; Della Destiara Haris	West Java; Suci Rizky Andini; Tiara Rosalia Nuraidah	West Java; Bunga Fitriani Romadhini; Nisak Puji Lestari
Women's double	Jakarta; Anggia Shitta Awanda; Della Destiara Haris	West Java; Suci Rizky Andini; Tiara Rosalia Nuraidah	Banten; Gebby Ristiyani Imawan; Ririn Amelia
Women's Team	West Java; Bunga Fitriani Romadhini; Febby Angguni; Gregoria Mariska Tunjung; Hanna Ramadini; Nisak Puji Lestari; Rika Rositawati; Suci Rizky Andini; Tiara Rosalia Nuraidah	Jakarta; Anggia Shitta Awanda; Aurum Oktavia Winata; Della Destiara Haris; Dian Fitriani; Fitriani; Gabriel Meilani Moningka; Ruselli Hartawan; Shella Devi Aulia	Central Java; Annisa Saufika; Desandha Vegarani Putri; Dinar Dyah Ayustine; Ghaida Nurul Ghaniyu; Gloria Emanuelle Widjaja; Intan Dwi Jayanti; Melati Daeva Oktavianti; Mychelle Chrystine Bandaso
Women's Team	West Java; Bunga Fitriani Romadhini; Febby Angguni; Gregoria Mariska Tunjung; Hanna Ramadini; Nisak Puji Lestari; Rika Rositawati; Suci Rizky Andini; Tiara Rosalia Nuraidah	Jakarta; Anggia Shitta Awanda; Aurum Oktavia Winata; Della Destiara Haris; Dian Fitriani; Fitriani; Gabriel Meilani Moningka; Ruselli Hartawan; Shella Devi Aulia	East Java; Berliyan Sudrajad; Devi Yunita Indah Sari; Marsa Indah Salsabila; Marsheilla Gischa Islami; Meirisa Cindy Sahputri; Ni Ketut Mahadewi Istarani; Sri Fatmawati; Winda Puji Hastuti
Mix double	Central Java; Praveen Jordan; Melati Daeva Oktavianti	Jakarta; Hafiz Faisal; Shella Devi Aulia	Jakarta; Wahyu Nayaka Arya; Della Destiara Haris
Mix double	Central Java; Praveen Jordan; Melati Daeva Oktavianti	Jakarta; Hafiz Faisal; Shella Devi Aulia	Central Java; Lukhi Apri Nugroho; Gloria Emanuelle Widjaja
