= Fencing at the 2016 Pekan Olahraga Nasional =

Fencing competitions at the 2016 Pekan Olahraga Nasional were held between 23 September and 28 September at Haris Hotel, Bandung, West Java, Indonesia. A total of 234 athletes competed in 12 events—six individual and six team.

== Qualification ==
Qualification for 12 competition classes were contested at the Kejuaraan Pra Pon Anggar 2015 which were held from 12 September to 29 September 2015 at Bikasoga Sport Center, Bandung, West Java. each province gets a maximum of 24 athlete quota.

Province	Men's			Women's			Total
Province	Épée	Foil	Sabre	Épée	Foil	Sabre	Total
Aceh		4		3	4	4	15
Bali				1			1
Banten		3	4	3		4	14
Bengkulu		1	1				2
Special Region of Yogyakarta			1				1
Jakarta	4	4	1	3	4		16
Gorontalo		1					1
Jambi	1						1
West Java	4	4	4	4	4	4	24
Central Java	4	4	4	4	4	4	24
East Java	4			4		4	12
West Kalimantan	4	1	4	4	4	4	21
South Kalimantan			1				1
Central Kalimantan	3						3
East Kalimantan	3	4	4	4	4	4	23
North Kalimantan		1					1
Riau Islands	1						1
Lampung				1			1
Maluku	4			1			5
North Maluku	1						1
Riau	3	4	4	3	4		18
South Sulawesi	4	4		4	1		13
Central Sulawesi	1						1
North Sulawesi			3			1	4
West Sumatra	1	1					2
South Sumatra	4	4	4	3	3	3	21
North Sumatra	3			4			7
Total (27 Province)	49	40	35	46	32	32	234

== Medalists ==
=== Men's ===
Nomor	Gold	Silver	Bronze
Individual épée	Muhammad Haerullah; South Sulawesi	Ryan Pratama; Central Java	Fajar Puji Raharjo; West Kalimantan
Individual épée	Muhammad Haerullah; South Sulawesi	Ryan Pratama; Central Java	Indra Jaya Kusuma; Jakarta
Team épée	West Kalimantan; Fajar Puji Raharjo; Nuraya Qadafi; M. Iqbal Pahlevy; Oktavianus Harry Putra	West Java; Andi Yanto; Derry Renanda Putra Siahaan; Djukardi; Yudi Setiawan	Jakarta; Indra Jaya Kusuma; Muhammad Indra Haryana; Niko Thomas; Afrizal
Team épée	West Kalimantan; Fajar Puji Raharjo; Nuraya Qadafi; M. Iqbal Pahlevy; Oktavianus Harry Putra	West Java; Andi Yanto; Derry Renanda Putra Siahaan; Djukardi; Yudi Setiawan	South Sulawesi; Muhammad Haerullah; Chris Kanta Wibawa; Chaeruddin; Rizky Almufarid
Individual foil	Muhammad Zulfikar; Riau	Aryanto; South Sulawesi	M. Fatah Prasetyo; Riau
Individual foil	Muhammad Zulfikar; Riau	Aryanto; South Sulawesi	Dennis Ariadinata Satriana; West Java
Team foil	West Java; Dennis Ariadinata Satriana; Dzulfi Ahmad Saeful; Ismail Ibnu Abu Bakar Khatab; Khaidir Yusuf	East Kalimantan; Kurnia Risnutama; Ricky Hafidz Jan Gunarto; Anur Ashori; Muhammad Aminullah	Jakarta; Aditya Baskara Hehanussa; Ajar Yuwandana; Fajar Galuh R Romico Tomasoa
Team foil	West Java; Dennis Ariadinata Satriana; Dzulfi Ahmad Saeful; Ismail Ibnu Abu Bakar Khatab; Khaidir Yusuf	East Kalimantan; Kurnia Risnutama; Ricky Hafidz Jan Gunarto; Anur Ashori; Muhammad Aminullah	Riau; M. Fatah Prasetyo; Muhammad Zulfikar; Jani Pratawa; Kevin Fadillah
Individual sabre	Idon Jaya Wiguna; West Java	Ricky Dhisulimah; South Sumatra	Michael Rumuat; East Kalimantan
Individual sabre	Idon Jaya Wiguna; West Java	Ricky Dhisulimah; South Sumatra	Ricard Henry Arfe Tarega; Central Java
Team sabre	South Sumatra; Ade Indra Ansori; Rully Mauliadhani; Ricky Dhisulimah; Agista Andhani	West Java; Mochammad Nizar Fardhani; Idon Jaya Wiguna; Taufan Adwitiya Soleman Salim; Dwinadi Santoso Suhendi	East Kalimantan; Hendi Agusta Ananda; Michael Rumuat; Mikhail Zams Pettalolo; Fandy Hiferialdy
Team sabre	South Sumatra; Ade Indra Ansori; Rully Mauliadhani; Ricky Dhisulimah; Agista Andhani	West Java; Mochammad Nizar Fardhani; Idon Jaya Wiguna; Taufan Adwitiya Soleman Salim; Dwinadi Santoso Suhendi	Central Java; Refly Adolof Hendra Tarega; Indra Agus Setiawan; Ricard Henry Arfe Tarega; Lukas Baskara

=== Women's ===
Nomor	Gold	Silver	Bronze
Individual épée	Isnawaty Sir Idar; South Sulawesi	Megawati; Riau	Dian Rahmayadi; North Sumatra
Individual épée	Isnawaty Sir Idar; South Sulawesi	Megawati; Riau	Aditya Rizky Pramudita; Jakarta
Team épée	West Java; Widiastuti Sobari; Khatrin Ghea Endar; Dian Eka Pratiwi; Maharani Setia Putri	East Java; Diana Eka Handriyani; Syafira Ayu Laksari; Monica Kenyo Excel; Rini Ismalasari	North Sumatra; Dian Rahmayadi; Jihan Siska; Mutia Atika; Dinda Novita
Team épée	West Java; Widiastuti Sobari; Khatrin Ghea Endar; Dian Eka Pratiwi; Maharani Setia Putri	East Java; Diana Eka Handriyani; Syafira Ayu Laksari; Monica Kenyo Excel; Rini Ismalasari	South Sulawesi; Isnawaty Sir Idar; Andi Almaidah; Claudya Astin; Arina Nur Andini
Individual foil	Verdiana Rihandini; West Kalimantan	Chintya Anreiny Pua; East Kalimantan	Mery Ananda; West Kalimantan
Individual foil	Verdiana Rihandini; West Kalimantan	Chintya Anreiny Pua; East Kalimantan	Herlin Erviana Purnamawati; East Kalimantan
Team foil	East Kalimantan; Chintya Anreiny Pua; Herlin Erviana Purnamawati; Ayu Miftahul Janah; Atika Zahrina	Jakarta; Voryn Thalya Kiriweno; Inca Mayasari; Alissa Gozali; Sheyla Juliandra Sumolang	Central Java; Flodesa; Oktavira Rachman; Jessica Vinca Sorongan; Dessy Megarany
Team foil	East Kalimantan; Chintya Anreiny Pua; Herlin Erviana Purnamawati; Ayu Miftahul Janah; Atika Zahrina	Jakarta; Voryn Thalya Kiriweno; Inca Mayasari; Alissa Gozali; Sheyla Juliandra Sumolang	West Kalimantan; Lana Triana; Verdiana Rihandini; Mery Ananda; Listiya Anggarini
Individual sabre	Alida Megaputri Salim; West Java	Agustin Dwi Damayanti; Central Java	Maria Wauran; East Java
Individual sabre	Alida Megaputri Salim; West Java	Agustin Dwi Damayanti; Central Java	Amelia Noerliyami; West Java
Team sabre	West Java; Rindhi Ayu; Alida Megaputri Salim; Amelia Noerliyami; Yosi Rifil Kotel	East Kalimantan; Ima Safitri; Dhea Marchelina; Dorry Adrinalia; Gebby Novita	Central Java; Yully Andhika Putri; Agustin Dwi Damayanti; Dinda Dwi Ariyanti; Adira Kurniawati
Team sabre	West Java; Rindhi Ayu; Alida Megaputri Salim; Amelia Noerliyami; Yosi Rifil Kotel	East Kalimantan; Ima Safitri; Dhea Marchelina; Dorry Adrinalia; Gebby Novita	East Java; Diah Permatasari; Maria Wauran; Salasabillah Botangia; Anis Puspika

=== Medal table ===
Host

1	West Java	5	2	2	9
2	South Sulawesi	2	1	2	5
3	West Kalimantan	2	0	3	5
4	East Kalimantan	1	3	3	7
5	Riau	1	1	2	4
6	South Sumatra	1	1	0	2
7	Central Java	0	2	4	6
8	Jakarta	0	1	4	5
9	East Java	0	1	2	3
10	North Sumatra	0	0	2	2
Total		12	12	24	48
