= Tarung Derajat =

Indonesian martial art form

- Also known as: AA Boxer or simply Boxer
- Focus: Striking and Kicking (Also includes Grappling and Sweeping)
- Country of origin: Indonesia
- Creator: Achmad Dradjat
- Official website: www.tarungderajat-aaboxer.com

Tarung Derajat is a full body contact hybrid martial art from Indonesia, created by Haji Achmad Dradjat. He developed the techniques through his experience as a street fighter during the 1960s in Bandung. Tarung Derajat is officially recognized as a national sport and used as a basic martial art training for the Indonesian Armed Forces and Indonesian National Police.

"Aku Ramah Bukan Berarti Takut, Aku Tunduk Bukan Berarti Takluk", is the motto of the martial art which translates to "I am friendly but it does not mean I am afraid, I bow but it does not mean I yield." in English. "BOX!" is the brotherhood greeting among the members of Tarung Derajat.

Although Tarung Derajat emphasizes on Striking and kicking, it also focuses on grappling and sweeping which are also included in its training method. As a stand-up martial art, Tarung Derajat was nicknamed as "BOXER". A practitioner of TD (Abbreviation for Tarung Derajat) is called Petarung, which translates to "fighter" in English. The main principles of Tarung Derajat are: Strength, Speed, Accuracy, Courage and Tenacity.

Since the 1990s, Tarung Derajat has been refined for sport. In 1998, the Tarung Derajat organization officially became a member of KONI. Since then, Tarung Derajat has a spot in Pekan Olahraga Nasional, a national multi-sport competition held every four years. Tarung Derajat main association KODRAT (Keluarga Olahraga Tarung Derajat) now has sub-organizations in 22 provinces in Indonesia.

Tarung Derajat was introduced as an exhibition number in the 2011 Southeast Asian Games in Palembang, Indonesia, Tarung Derajat was proposed to be included on SEA GAMES 2013 in Myanmar, however it was later cancelled.

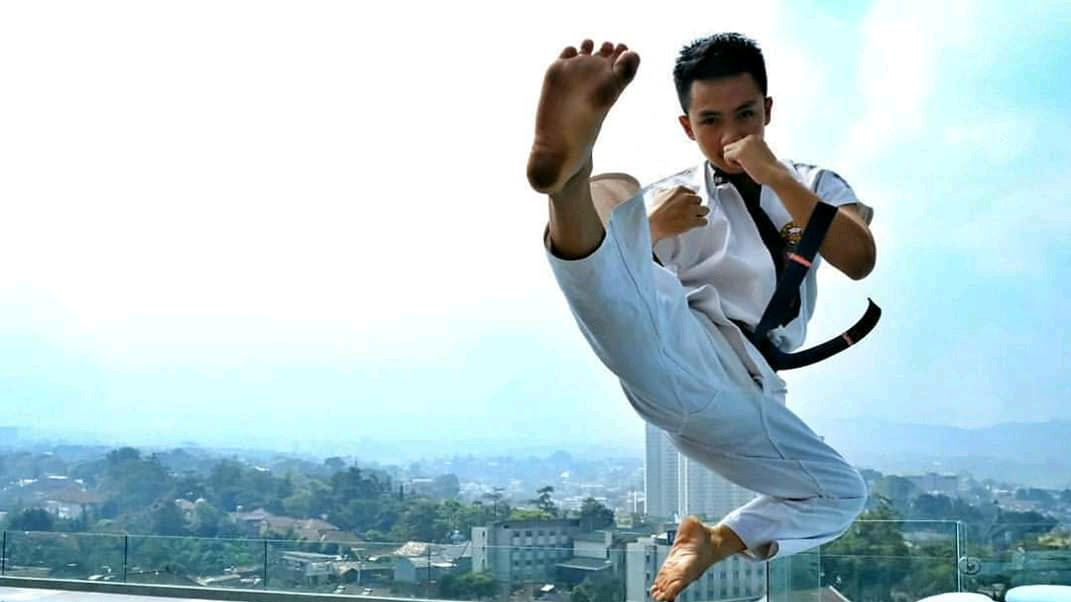
Martial arts from Sundanese, use full body contact

== History ==
Tarung Derajat was created by Haji Achmad Dradjat. He grew up in a tough society in Bandung, where the youngsters were used to fighting on the street. This situation insisted Guru Haji Achmad Drajat to be a street-fighter. He didn't start the fight, but the situation required him to fight in order to survive. Then he decided to create his own way of fighting. He realized that there are 4 basic movements in a fight, those are: punching, kicking, blocking/dodging, and grappling. In 1968, when he was 18 years old, his friends and other youngsters came to him and asked him to teach them. Then in 1972, he created a shelter for his students, called AA BOXER. In his opinion, a martial art created in Indonesia must have a name in Bahasa Indonesia (Indonesian language), so he changed "BOXER" to "Tarung Derajat". The word "tarung" means fight and the word "derajat" means pride, dignity, or prestige. So concisely, 'Tarung Derajat' means fighting for pride.
