= National Sports Week =

Multi-sport competition in Indonesia

National Sports Week Pekan Olahraga Nasional
- Logo of KONI; three connecting circles within the logo is usually used as the logo of PON
- Abbreviation: PON
- Frequency: Every 4 years
- Inaugurated: 1948 PON; Solo, Central Java
- Most recent: 2024 PON in Banda Aceh, Aceh and Medan, North Sumatera
- Next event: 2028 PON

The National Sports Week (Indonesian: Pekan Olahraga Nasional, abbreviated as PON) is a multi-sport event held every four years in Indonesia. The participants of this event are the athletes from all provinces of Indonesia. It is organized by the National Sports Committee of Indonesia (KONI).

== History ==
The Indonesian Sports Association (ISI) was established in Jakarta in 1938 with the aim of coordinating the existing sports associations including the Football Federation. During the Japanese occupation of the Dutch East Indies from 1942 to 1945, sporting activities were coordinated by the Sports Practice Movement. Following the Indonesian Declaration of Independence in 1945, that nation took over the running of its own sport and in January 1946, a conference was held in Solo, Central Java, which gave rise to the Indonesian Olympic Committee (KORI), chaired by Sultan Hamengkubuwono IX.

Indonesia was unable to participate in the 1948 Olympic Games because Indonesian independence had not been recognized, and Indonesia was not a member of the International Olympic Committee. At an emergency conference in Solo on 1 May 1948 to discuss Indonesia's failure to compete in the Olympics, it was decided to organize the first National Games, which ran from 8–12 September 1948.

During the first Pekan Olahraga Nasional event, many sporting organizations tested a uniform system which is to be recognized throughout the country as the official scoring method. Until then, no clear rules were evident. In the case of the Aurora Club, Bandung, later to be renamed into Health and Strength organization, a scoring system went into trial for the weightlifting event; in which Carl Sugianto was crowned as the first weightlifting champion of Indonesia.

== List of National Sports Week ==
Pekan Olahraga Nasional host cities (Jakarta hosted in 1951, ~~1965~~, 1973–1996); Notes: ~~Canceled~~, Future events

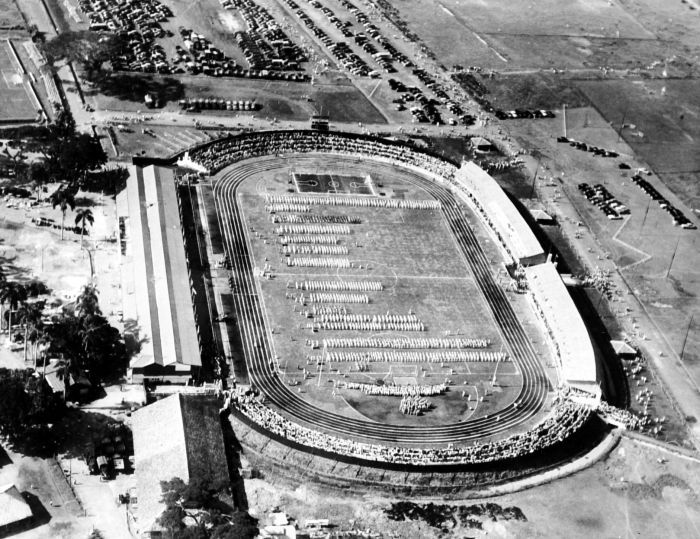
Opening ceremony of PON II 1951 in Jakarta

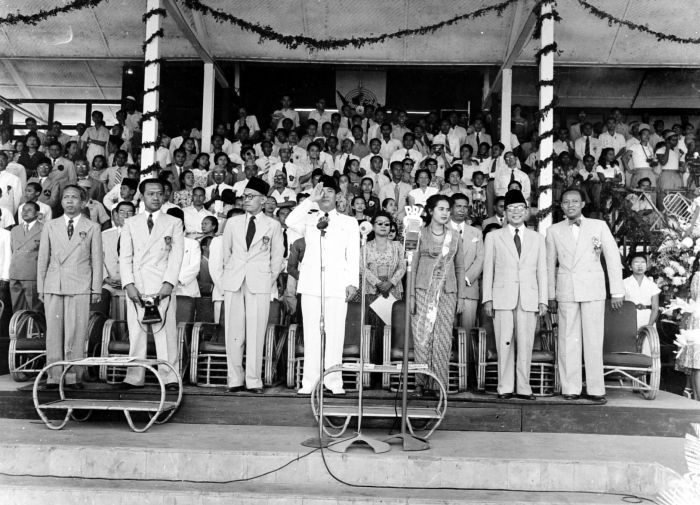
President Sukarno and Vice President Mohammad Hatta at the PON II 1951 opening ceremony in Jakarta

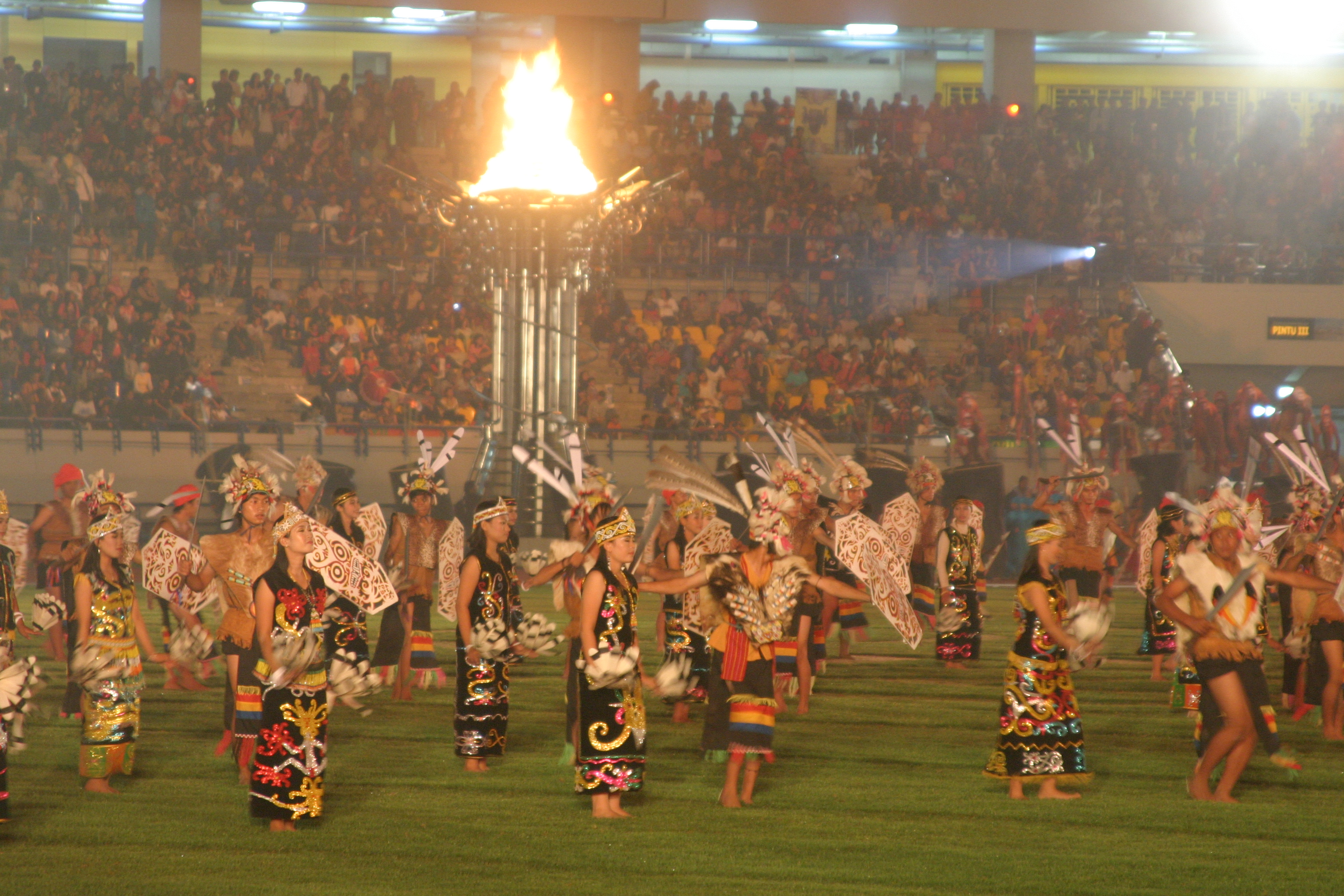
The Dayak dance in PON XVII 2008 opening ceremony in Palaran Stadium, Samarinda.

| Games | Year | Host city | Host Province | Provinces | Dates | Top province |
|---|---|---|---|---|---|---|
| I | 1948 | Surakarta | Central Java | 8 | 8–12 September 1948 | Central Java |
| II | 1951 | Jakarta | Jakarta | 10 | 21–28 October 1951 | West Java |
| III | 1953 | Medan | North Sumatra | 13 | 20–27 September 1953 | West Java |
| IV | 1957 | Makassar | South Sulawesi | 17 | 27 September–6 October 1957 | Jakarta |
| V | 1961 | Bandung | West Java | 23 | 23 September–1 October 1961 | West Java |
| VI^{1} | 1965 | Jakarta | Jakarta | N/A | 8 October–10 November 1965 | - |
| VII | 1969 | Surabaya | East Java | 26 | 26 August–6 September 1969 | Jakarta |
| VIII | 1973 | Jakarta | Jakarta | 26 | 4–15 August 1973 | Jakarta |
| IX | 1977 | Jakarta | Jakarta | 26 | 23 July–3 August 1977 | Jakarta |
| X | 1981 | Jakarta | Jakarta | 27 | 19–30 September 1981 | Jakarta |
| XI | 1985 | Jakarta | Jakarta | 27 | 9–20 September 1985 | Jakarta |
| XII | 1989 | Jakarta | Jakarta | 27 | 18–28 October 1989 | Jakarta |
| XIII | 1993 | Jakarta | Jakarta | 27 | 9–19 September 1993 | Jakarta |
| XIV | 1996 | Jakarta | Jakarta | 26 | 9–25 September 1996 | Jakarta |
| XV | 2000 | Surabaya | East Java | 26 | 19 June–1 July 2000 | East Java |
| XVI | 2004 | Palembang | South Sumatra | 30 | 2–14 September 2004 | Jakarta |
| XVII | 2008 | Samarinda | East Kalimantan | 33 | 6–17 July 2008 | East Java |
| XVIII | 2012 | Pekanbaru | Riau | 33 | 9–20 September 2012 | Jakarta |
| XIX | 2016 | Bandung | West Java | 34 | 17–29 September 2016 | West Java |
| XX | 2021 | Jayapura | Papua | 34 | 2–15 October 2021 | West Java |
| XXI | 2024 | Banda Aceh–Medan | Aceh–North Sumatra | 39 | 9–20 September 2024 | West Java |
| XXII | 2028 | TBA | West–East Nusa Tenggara | TBA | TBA | TBA |

^{1} cancelled because of the 30 September Movement
^{2} originally 20 October–2 November 2020, postponed because of COVID-19 pandemic

== List of champions ==
Jakarta has become the province with the most overall championship titles in PON which has been held since 1948 in Surakarta.

| No. | Province | Overall Champion | Total |
|---|---|---|---|
| 1 | Jakarta | 1957, 1969, 1973, 1977, 1981, 1985, 1989, 1993, 1996, 2004, 2012 | 11 |
| 2 | West Java | 1951, 1953, 1961, 2016, 2021, 2024 | 6 |
| 3 | East Java | 2000, 2008 | 2 |
| 4 | Central Java | 1948^{1} | 1 |

^{1} Overall champion as Surakarta Residency

== PON Remaja (National Youth Sports Week) ==
In September 2010, Indonesian Minister of Youth and Sport Affairs, Andi Mallarangeng, decided to create a youth version of Pekan Olahraga Nasional. Concerns due to failure of Indonesian contingent in the 2010 Youth Olympics was the background of the event's creation. The first PON Remaja was originally scheduled for 2013, but it was moved to 2014 due to financial problems.

=== Editions ===
| Games | Year | Host province | Dates | Winner |
|---|---|---|---|---|
| I | 2014 | East Java | 9–15 December 2014 | East Java |
| II | 2017 | Central Java | Cancelled | |

== Pekan Paralimpik Nasional (National Paralympic Week) ==
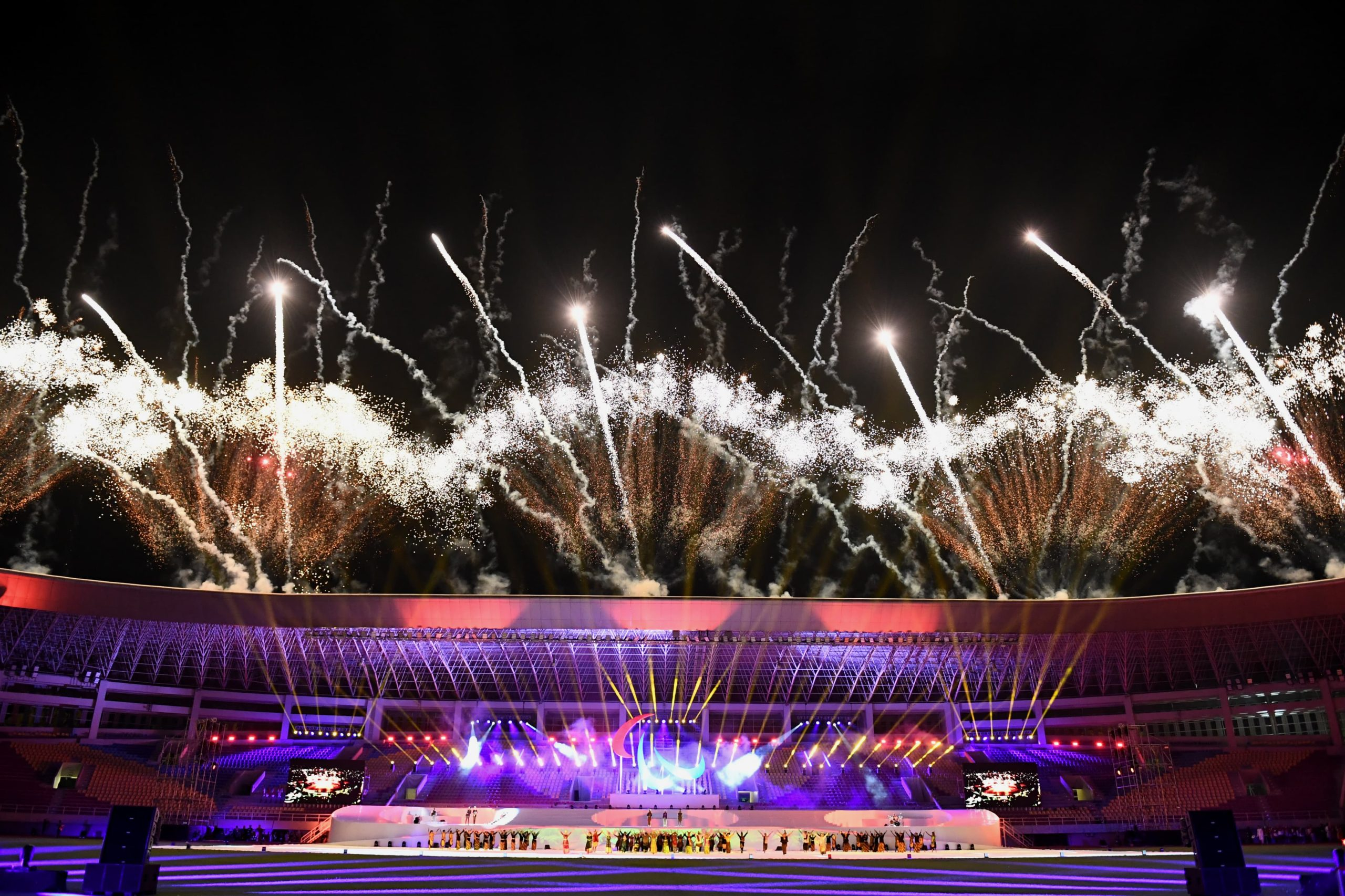
The Peparnas XVII 2024 opening in Manahan Stadium, Surakarta.

The National Paralympic Week (Indonesian: Pekan Paralimpiade Nasional), abbreviated as Peparnas, is multi-sport event for Indonesian athletes with disabilities. It was known as Pekan Olahraga Cacat Nasional (Porcanas) until 2008 edition and held separately with PON until 2004.

=== Editions ===
| Games | Year | Host city | Host province | Top province |
|---|---|---|---|---|
| I | 1957 | Surakarta | Central Java | Central Java |
| II | 1959 | Surakarta | Central Java | Central Java |
| III | 1964 | Surakarta | Central Java | West Java |
| IV | 1969 | Yogyakarta | Yogyakarta Special Region | West Java |
| V | 1972 | Bandung | West Java | Jakarta |
| VI | 1975 | Makassar | South Sulawesi | South Sulawesi |
| VII | 1980 | Surakarta | Central Java | Jakarta |
| VII | 1984 | Surakarta | Central Java | Central Java |
| IX | 1988 | Malang | East Java | Jakarta |
| X | 1993 | Yogyakarta | Yogyakarta Special Region | Jakarta |
| XI | 1998 | Bandung | West Java | West Java |
| XII | 2004 | Palembang | South Sumatra | West Java |
| XIII | 2008 | Samarinda | East Kalimantan | Central Java |
| XIV | 2012 | Pekanbaru | Riau | Central Java |
| XV | 2016 | Bandung | West Java | West Java |
| XVI | 2021 | Jayapura | Papua | West Java |
| XVII | 2024 | Surakarta | Central Java | Central Java |
| XVIII | 2028 | TBA | West–East Nusa Tenggara | Future event |
