= National Sports Committee of Indonesia =

Sports governing body of Indonesia

National Sports Committee of Indonesia Komite Olahraga Nasional Indonesia
- Country: Indonesia
- Code: INA
- Created: 1946
- Recognized: 1952
- Continental Association: OCA
- Headquarters: Jakarta, Indonesia
- President: Marciano Norman
- Secretary General: Francis Wanandi
- Website: koni.or.id

The National Sports Committee of Indonesia (Indonesian: Komite Olahraga Nasional Indonesia, abbreviated KONI) is the sports governing body of Indonesia. It was founded in 1946 to unite the various satellite sports associations that was created within the regions of Indonesia. KONI is responsible on sport development as well as organising sporting events within Indonesian national boundary on national level. It organizes the Pekan Olahraga Nasional (PON), multi-sport event held every four years where Indonesian athletes compete. It is the largest sporting event in Indonesia.

In 2005, KOI (Komite Olimpiade Indonesia or Indonesian Olympic Committee) was formed as a separate entity from KONI. KOI is responsible as Indonesian National Olympic Committee, to organise Indonesian participation in international sporting events, such as Olympic Games, Asian Games, Southeast Asian Games, etc. The KONI-KOI separation was based according to Act No. 3 of 2005 on National Sport System, and further enforced with Government Regulation No. 17 of 2007 about the organizing of sporting events.

== List of general chairmen of the Indonesian national sports committee ==
No	Name	Start job title	End job title
1	Sri Sultan Hamengku Buwono IX	1967	1986
2	Surono Reksodimedjo	1986	1994
3	Wismoyo Arismunandar	1995	2003
4	Agum Gumelar	2003	2007
5	Rita Subowo	2007	2011
6	Tono Suratman	2011	2019
7	Marciano Norman	2019	incumbent
