= Venues of the 2018 Asian Games =

The 2018 Asian Games featured 80 venues for competitions and training on the fourteen days Games competition from 18 August to 2 September 2018.

== Jakarta ==
=== Gelora Bung Karno Sports Complex ===
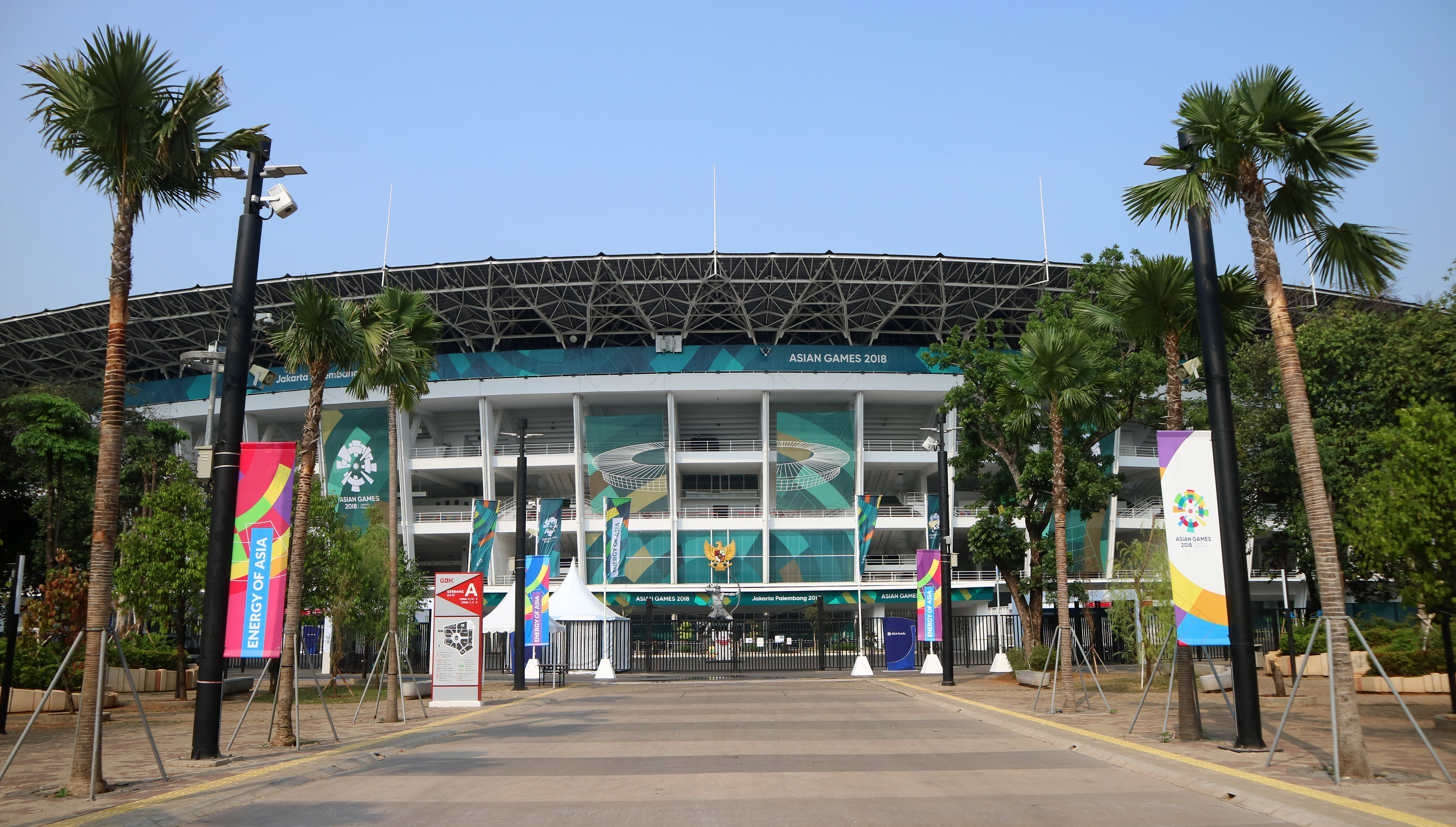
The Main Stadium hosted the ceremonies and athletics

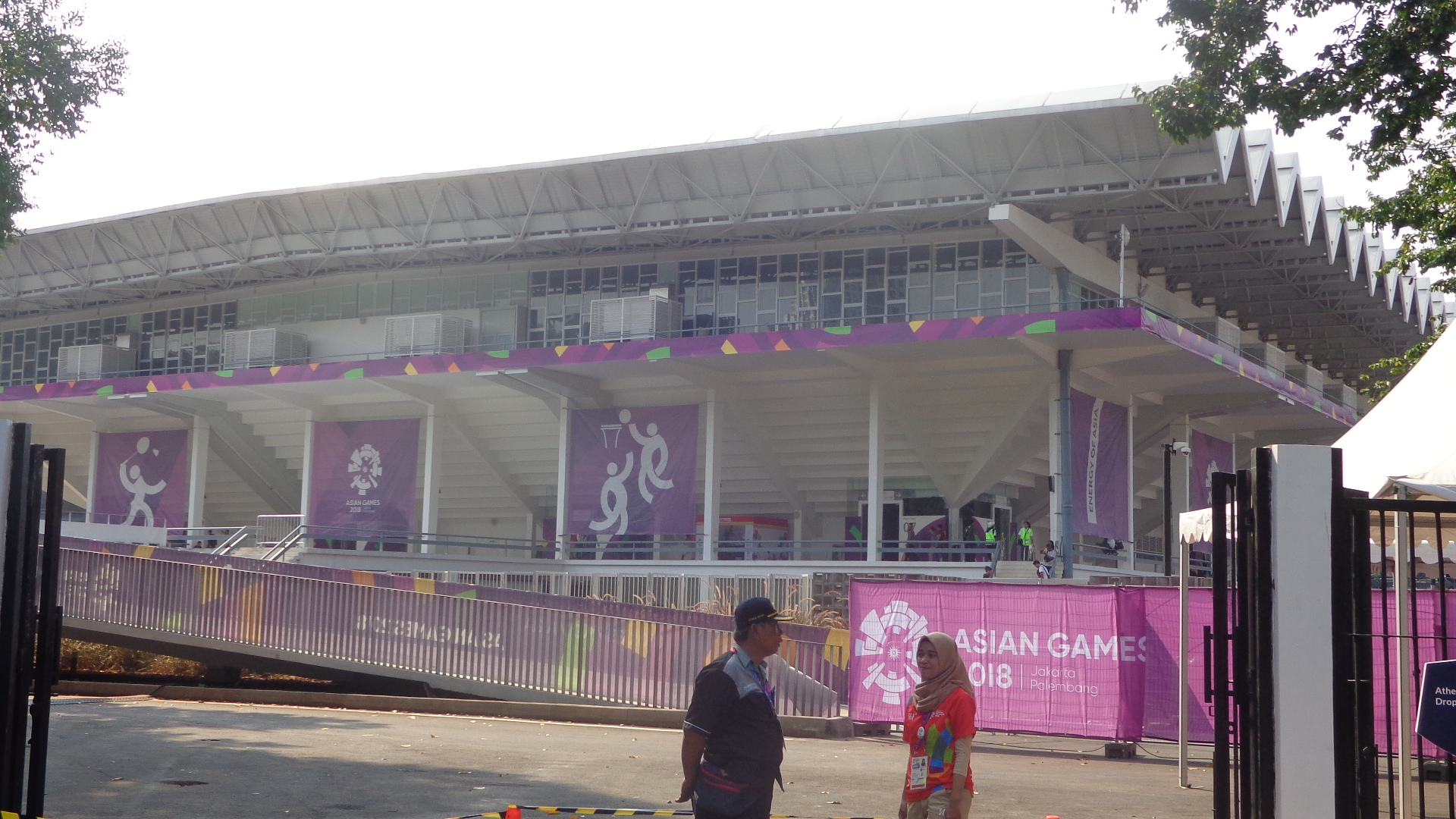
Istora hosted badminton and basketball

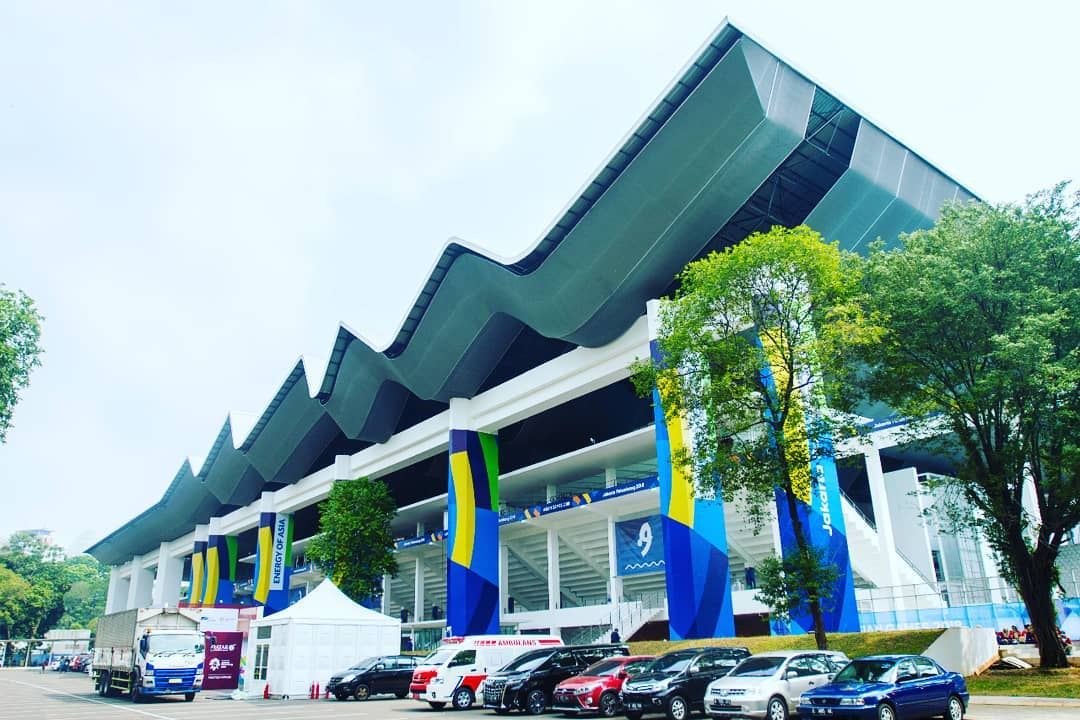
Gelora Bung Karno Aquatic Stadium during the Games

Venue	Events	Capacity	Ref.
Main Stadium	Opening and closing ceremonies, Athletics	77,193	
Istora	Badminton, Basketball	7,166	
Aquatic Stadium	Aquatics (diving, swimming, artistic swimming, water polo)	7,800	
Tennis Indoor Stadium	Volleyball	3,750	
Tennis Outdoor Stadium	3×3 basketball	3,800	
Basketball Hall	Basketball	2,400	
Hockey Field	Field hockey	818	
Baseball Field	Baseball	2,000	
Softball Field	Softball	≈2,000	
Archery Field	Archery	97	
Rugby Field	Rugby sevens		
Squash Stadium	Squash	560	
Jakarta Convention Center	Fencing (Cendrawasih Hall)	temporary stands	
Jakarta Convention Center	Judo, Karate, Taekwondo (Plenary Hall)	temporary stands	
Jakarta Convention Center	Wrestling, Ju-jitsu, Kurash, Sambo (Assembly Hall)	temporary stands	

=== East Jakarta ===
Venue	Events	Capacity	Location	Ref.
Jakarta International Velodrome	Cycling (track)	3,000	Rawamangun	
Jakarta International Baseball Arena	Baseball	1,000	Rawamangun	
Jakarta International Equestrian Park	Equestrian	1,500	Pulomas	
Pulomas International BMX Center	Cycling (BMX)	450	Pulomas	
Pencak Silat Hall	Pencak silat	3,000	Taman Mini Indonesia Indah	
Theatre Garuda	Kabaddi	1,500	Taman Mini Indonesia Indah	
POPKI Sports Hall	Handball	5,000	Cibubur	

=== North Jakarta ===
Venue	Events	Capacity	Location	Ref.
Ancol Beach Marina	Sailing (Sea Front - Marina)		Ancol, North Jakarta	
Ancol Beach Marina	Jet ski (Ancol Beach)		Ancol, North Jakarta	
The BritAma Arena	ESports	5,000	Kelapa Gading	

=== Central Jakarta ===
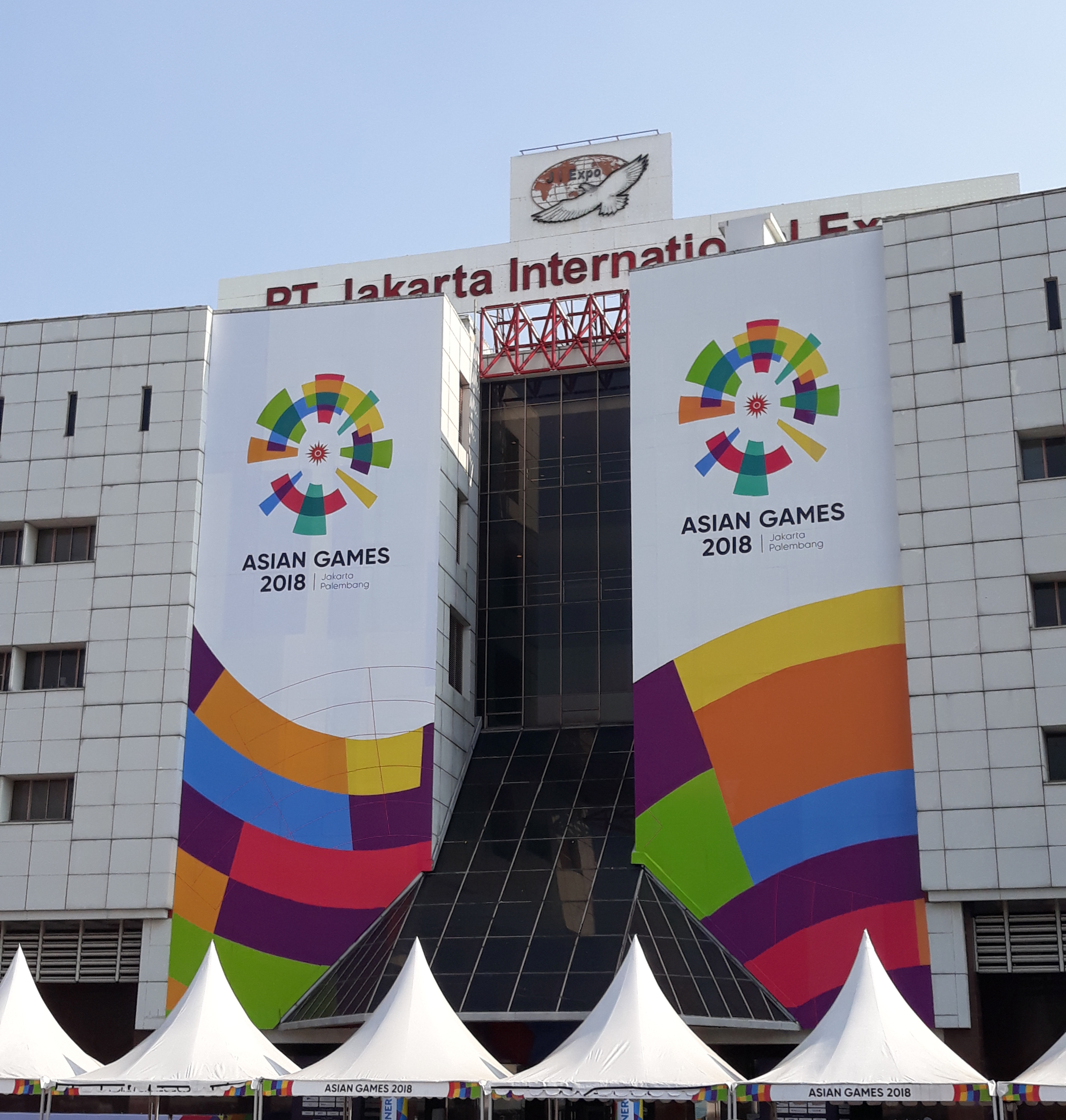
Jakarta International Expo was the venue for 6 sports of the Games.

Venue	Events	Capacity	Location	Ref.
Jakarta International Expo	Boxing (Hall C3)	temporary venue	Kemayoran	
Jakarta International Expo	Contract bridge (Ballroom)	temporary venue	Kemayoran	
Jakarta International Expo	Gymnastics (Hall D)	temporary venue	Kemayoran	
Jakarta International Expo	Wushu (Hall A2 & A3)	temporary venue	Kemayoran	
Jakarta International Expo	Table tennis (Hall B)	temporary venue	Kemayoran	
Jakarta International Expo	Weightlifting (Hall A)	temporary venue	Kemayoran	

=== South Jakarta ===
Venue	Events	Capacity	Location	Ref.
Pondok Indah Golf & Country Club	Golf		Pondok Indah	
Bulungan Sport Hall	Volleyball	900	Kebayoran Baru	

== Palembang ==
Venue	Events	Capacity	Location	Ref.
Gelora Sriwijaya Stadium	Women's football	23,000	Jakabaring Sport City	
Bukit Asam Tennis Stadium	Tennis, Soft tennis		Jakabaring Sport City	
Jakabaring Lake	Canoeing (sprint and traditional boat race), Rowing, Triathlon		Jakabaring Sport City	
Ranau Sports Hall	Sepak takraw	2,000	Jakabaring Sport City	
Jakabaring Bowling Center	Bowling	300	Jakabaring Sport City	
Jakabaring Sport Climbing Arena	Sport climbing		Jakabaring Sport City	
Jakabaring Beach Volleyball Arena	Beach volleyball		Jakabaring Sport City	
Jakabaring Shooting Range	Shooting		Jakabaring Sport City	
Jakabaring Roller Skate Circuit	Roller sports (Roller skate)		Jakabaring Sport City	
Jakabaring Skateboard Circuit	Roller sports (Skateboard)		Jakabaring Sport City	
Jakabaring Aquatic Stadium	Canoe polo	3,000	Jakabaring Sport City	
Bumi Sriwijaya Stadium	Women's football	7,000	Palembang	

== West Java and Banten ==
Venue	Events	Capacity	Location	Ref.
Jalak Harupat Stadium	Men's football	27,000	Soreang, Bandung Regency	
Pakansari Stadium	Men's football	30,000	Cibinong, Bogor Regency	
Patriot Candrabhaga Stadium	Men's football	30,000	Bekasi	
Wibawa Mukti Stadium	Men's football	28,778	Cikarang, Bekasi Regency	
Gunung Mas	Paragliding		Puncak, Bogor Regency	
APM Equestrian Centre	Modern pentathlon		Tigaraksa, Tangerang Regency	
Khe Bun Hill Subang	Cycling (MTB)		Subang Regency	
Streets of Subang	Cycling (road race)		Subang Regency	
Bendung Rentang	Canoeing (slalom)		Majalengka Regency	

== See also ==
- 2018 Asian Para Games § Venues
