= Jakabaring LRT station =

Railway station in Indonesia

P12 Jakabaring
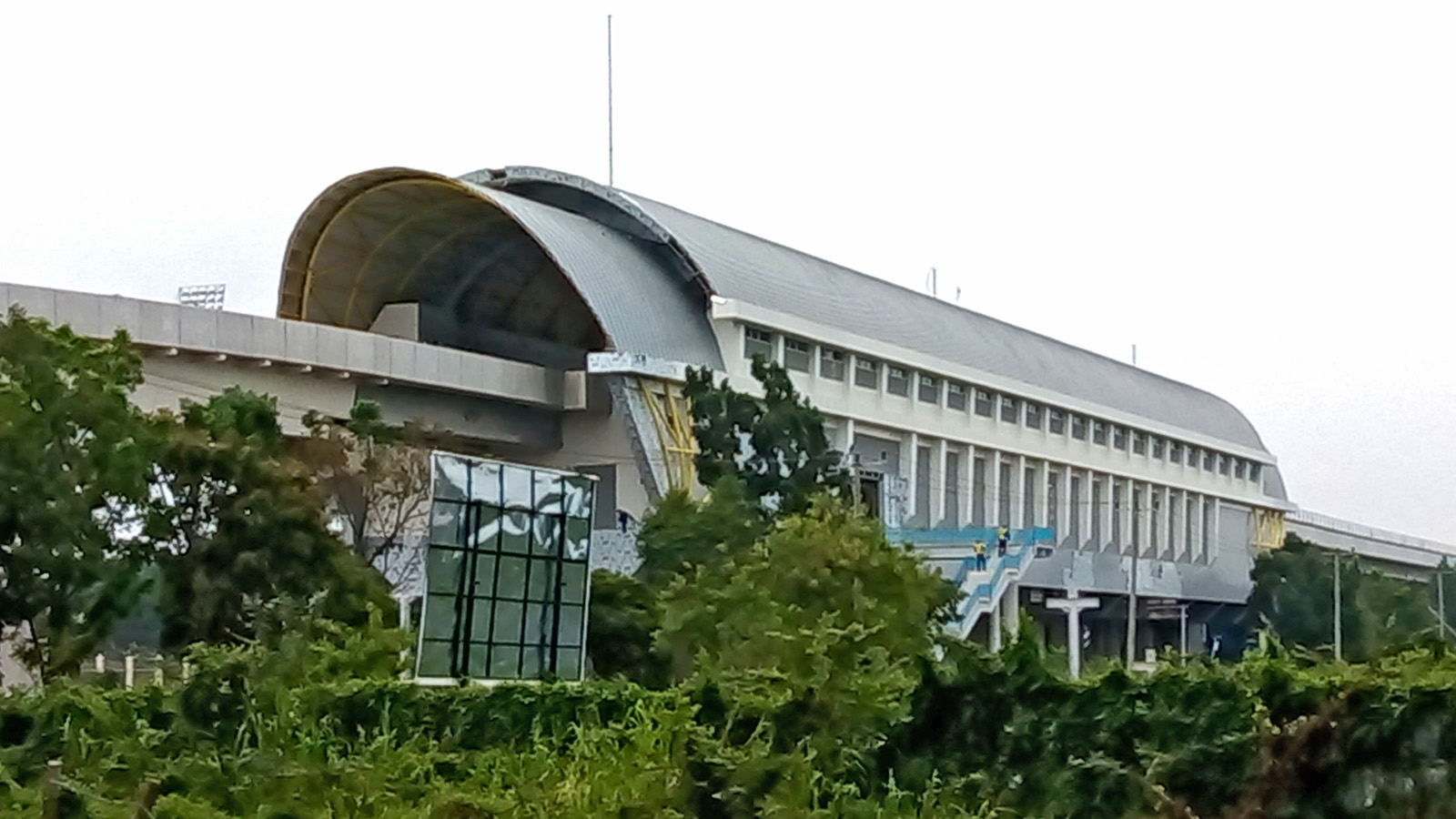
- Jakabaring Station, photo was taken on 19 February 2018

General information
- Location: Jl. Gubernur H. A Bastari, 15 Ulu, Seberang Ulu I, Palembang; South Sumatra; Indonesia
- Coordinates: 3.02317°S 104.784682°E
- System: Palembang LRT station
- Owner: Indonesian Railway Company
- Operator: Indonesian Railway Company
- Line: Line 1
- Platforms: 2 side platforms
- Tracks: 2

Construction
- Structure type: Elevated
- Parking: none
- Cycle facilities: none
- Accessible: Available

Other information
- Station code: JAB

History
- Opened: 23 July 2018 trial 1 August 2018 full

Services
| Preceding station | Palembang LRT | Following station |
|---|---|---|
| Polresta towards SMB II | Line 1 | DJKA; Terminus |
Location
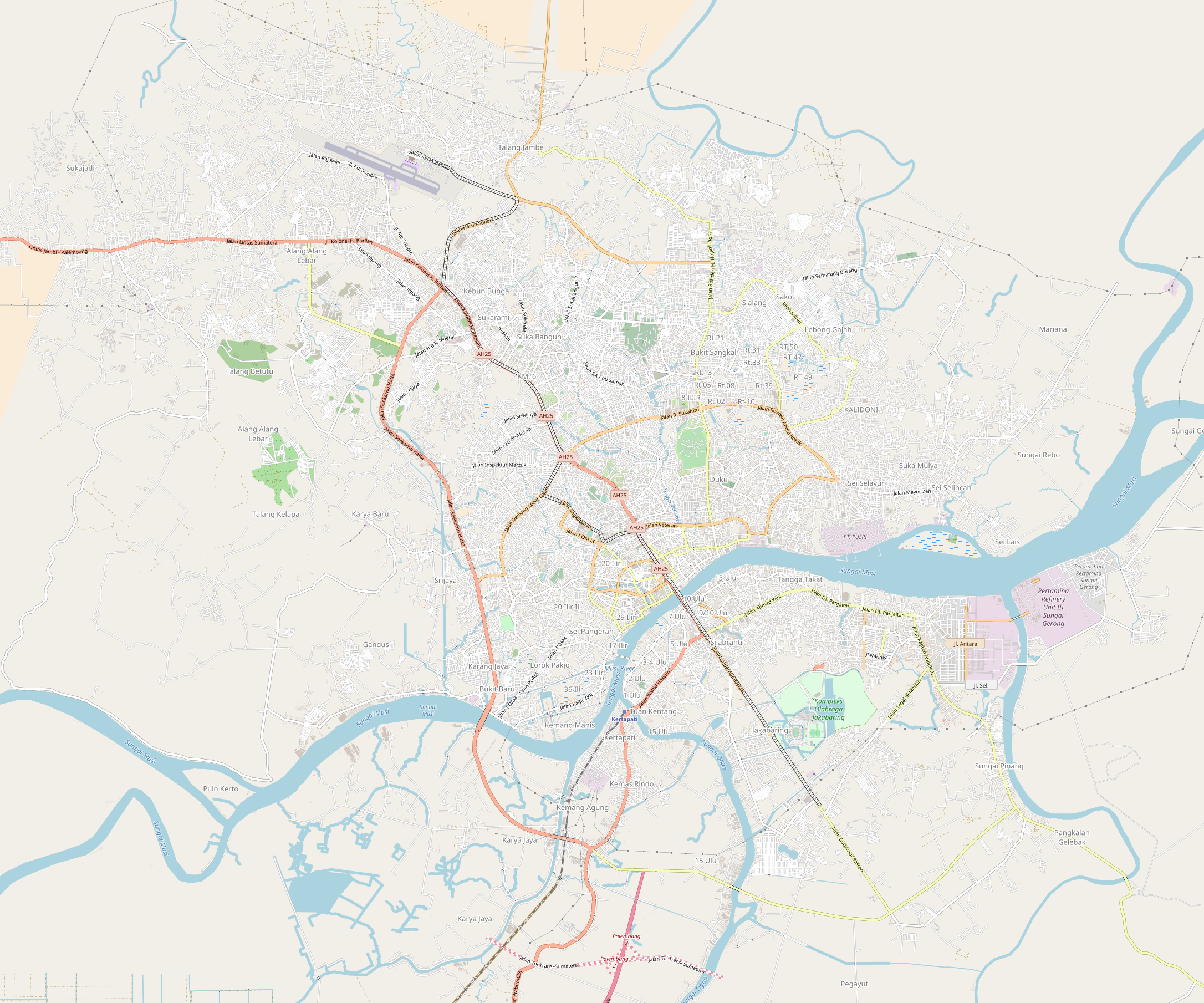
- Location within Palembang

Jakabaring Station is a station of the Palembang LRT Line 1, located in the city of Palembang, in South Sumatra, Indonesia.

The station is not far from Jakabaring Aquatic Center, Jakabaring Sport City and Gelora Sriwijaya Stadium. The station was one of six stations that opened at the Palembang LRT launch on 1 August 2018.

== Station layout ==
| 2F; Platforms | Side platform, doors will open on the right |
| 2F; Platforms | Platform 1 | LRT Line 1 towards DJKA → |
| 2F; Platforms | Platform 2 | ← LRT Line 1 towards SMB II |
| 2F; Platforms | Side platform, doors will open on the right |
| 1F | Concourse | Faregates, Ticket Booths, Station Control, Shops, Musalla |
| G | Street Level | Parking (plan) |
