= Ampera LRT station =

Railway station in Indonesia

P10 Ampera
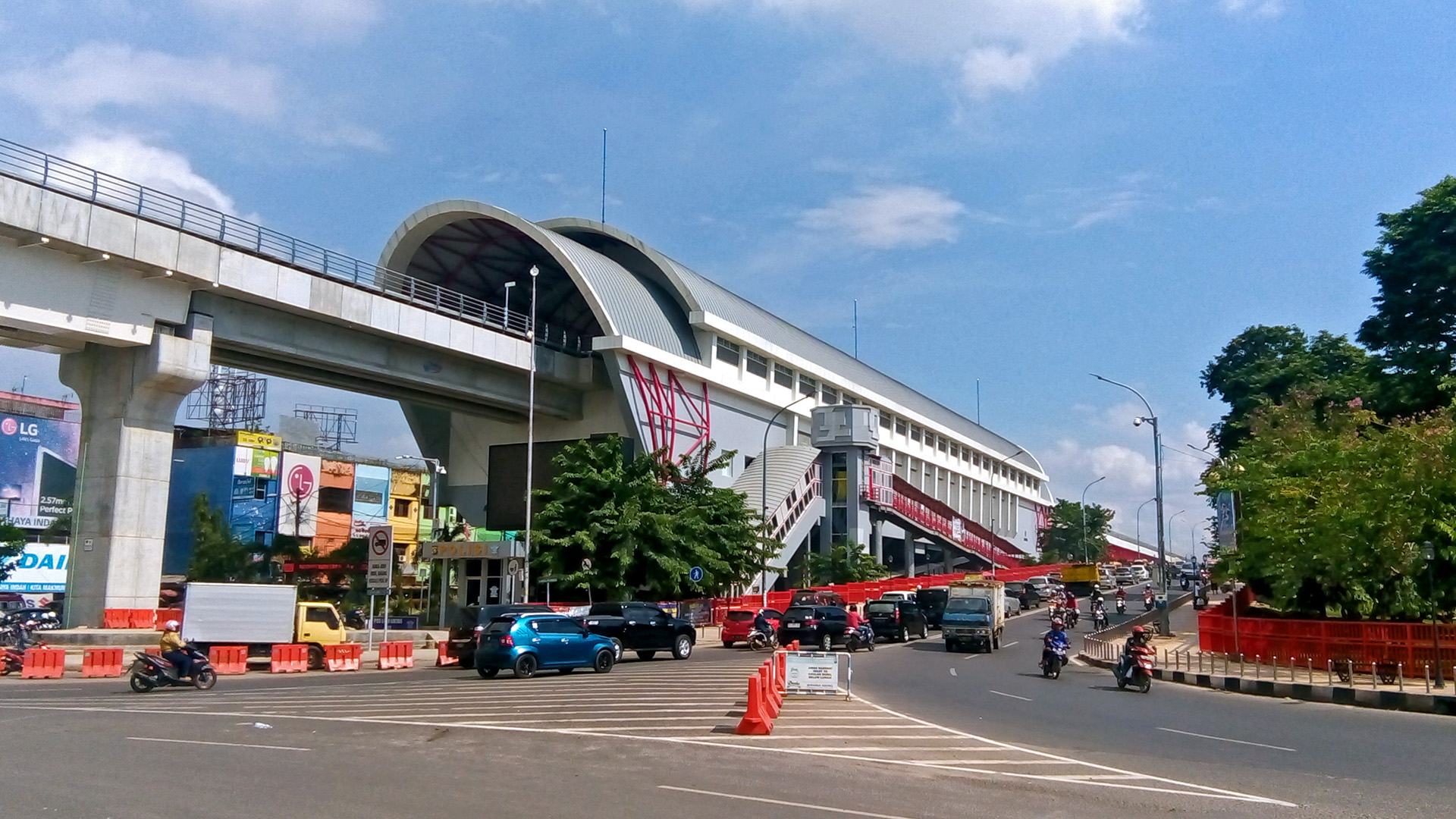
- Ampera Station, photo was taken on 1 December 2018

General information
- Location: Jl. Jenderal Sudirman, 16 Ilir, Ilir Timur I, Palembang; South Sumatra; Indonesia
- Coordinates: 2.988946°S 104.762056°E
- System: Palembang LRT station
- Owner: Indonesian Railway Company
- Operator: Indonesian Railway Company
- Line: Line 1
- Platforms: 2 side platforms
- Tracks: 2

Construction
- Structure type: Elevated
- Parking: Available
- Cycle facilities: none
- Accessible: Available

Other information
- Station code: AMP

History
- Opened: 23 July 2018 trial 1 August 2018 full

Services
Preceding station	Palembang LRT	Following station
Cinde towards SMB II	Line 1	Polresta towards DJKA
Location
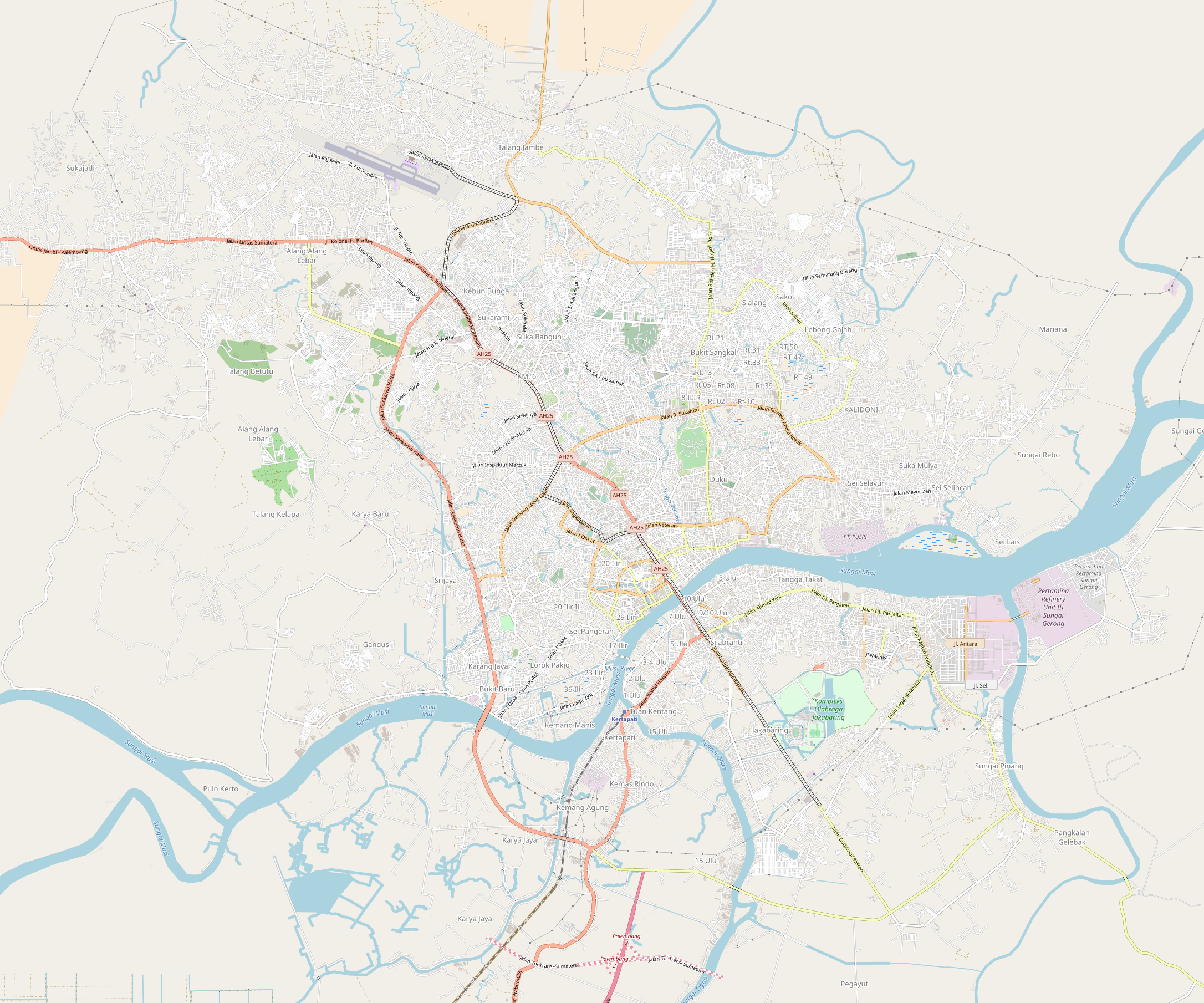
- Location within Palembang

Ampera Station is a station of the Palembang LRT Line 1, located in Ilir Timur I, Palembang.

The station is close to the Ampera Bridge and Kuto Besak Fortress. The station became one of six stations that opened at the Palembang LRT launch on 1 August 2018.

== Station layout ==
2F; Platforms	Side platform, doors will open on the right
2F; Platforms	Platform 1	LRT Line 1 towards DJKA →
2F; Platforms	Platform 2	← LRT Line 1 towards SMB II
2F; Platforms	Side platform, doors will open on the right
1F	Concourse	Faregates, Ticket Booths, Station Control, Shops, Musalla
G	Street Level	Parking
