= Cinde LRT station =

Light rail station in Palembang, Indonesia

P09 Cinde
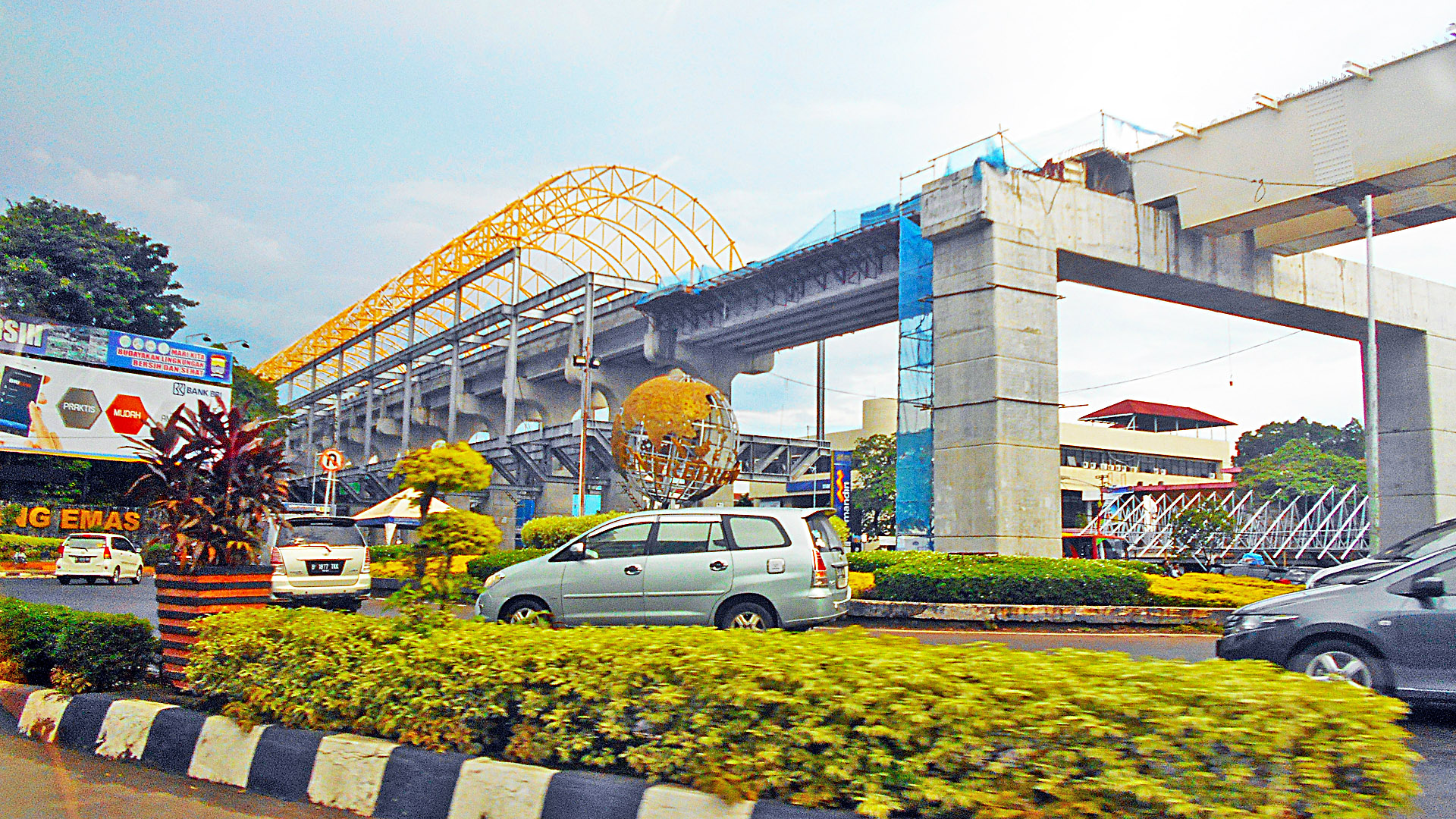
- Cinde Station under construction, photo was taken in June 2017

General information
- Location: Jl. Jenderal Sudirman, 17 Ilir, Ilir Timur I, Palembang; South Sumatra; Indonesia
- Coordinates: 2.980701°S 104.756216°E
- System: Palembang LRT station
- Owner: Indonesian Railway Company
- Operator: Indonesian Railway Company
- Line: Line 1
- Platforms: 2 side platforms
- Tracks: 2

Construction
- Structure type: Elevated
- Parking: none
- Cycle facilities: none
- Accessible: Available

Other information
- Station code: CIN

History
- Opened: 23 July 2018 trial 1 August 2018 full

Services
Preceding station	Palembang LRT	Following station
Dishub towards SMB II	Line 1	Ampera towards DJKA
Location
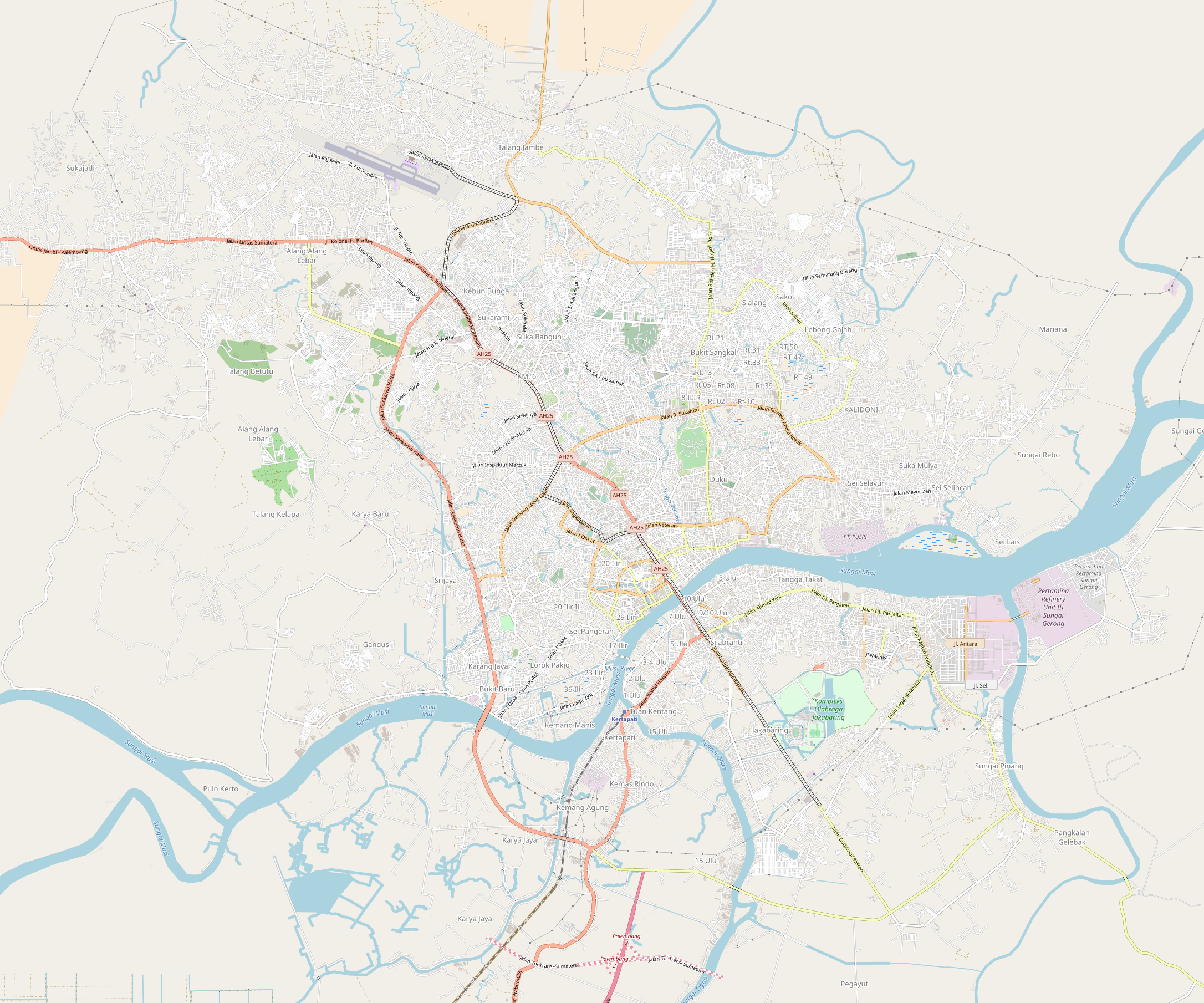
- Location within Palembang

Cinde Station is a station on the Palembang LRT Line 1 located in Ilir Timur I, Palembang.

The station is close to the Cinde Market and the Entrepreneur Monument. The station was one of six stations that opened at the Palembang LRT launch on 1 August 2018.

== Station layout ==
2F; Platforms	Side platform, doors will open on the right
2F; Platforms	Platform 1	LRT Line 1 towards DJKA →
2F; Platforms	Platform 2	← LRT Line 1 towards SMB II
2F; Platforms	Side platform, doors will open on the right
1F	Concourse	Faregates, Ticket Booths, Station Control, Shops, Musalla
G	Street Level	Parking (plan)

== Gallery ==
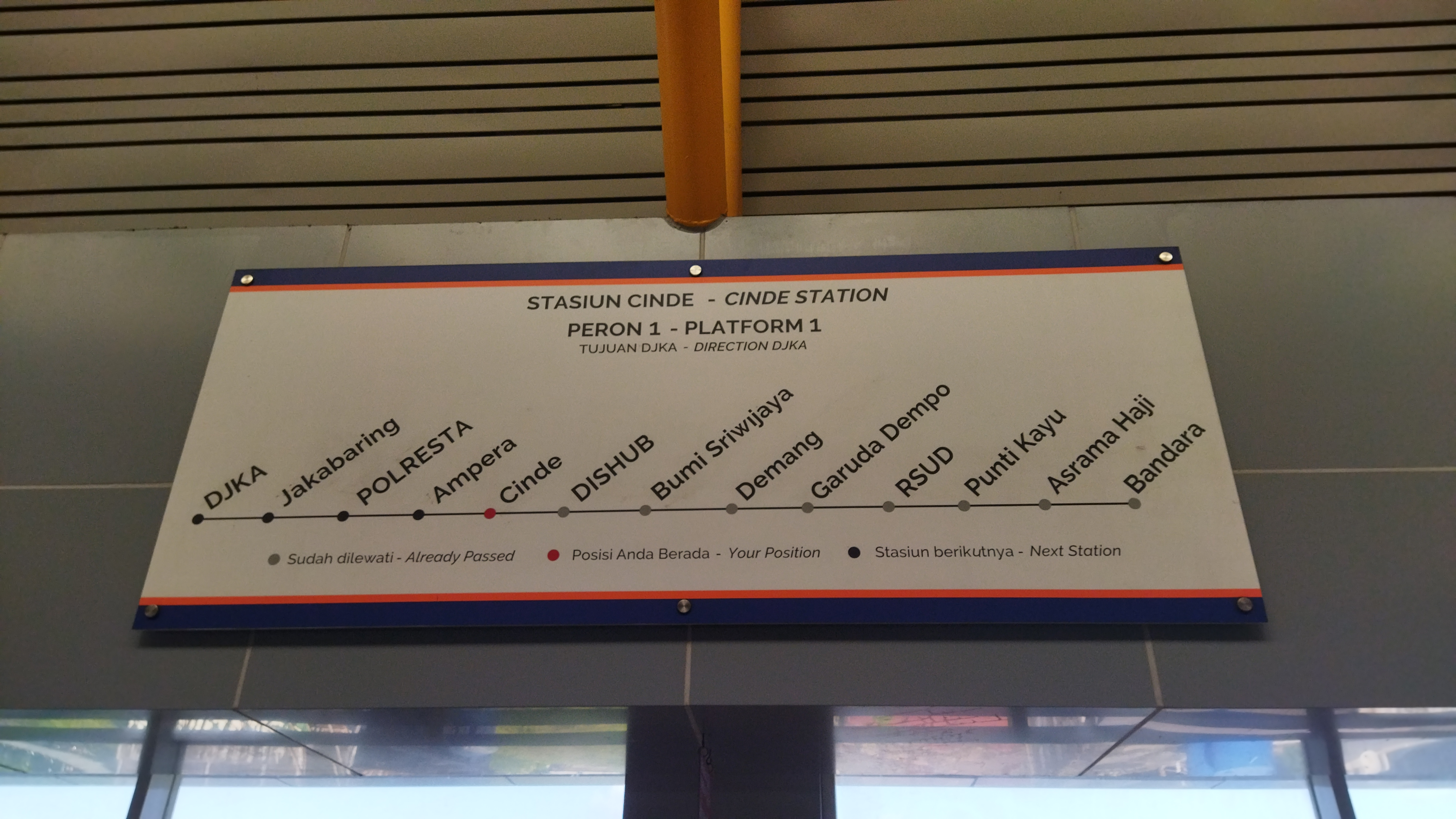
Cinde Station LRT map

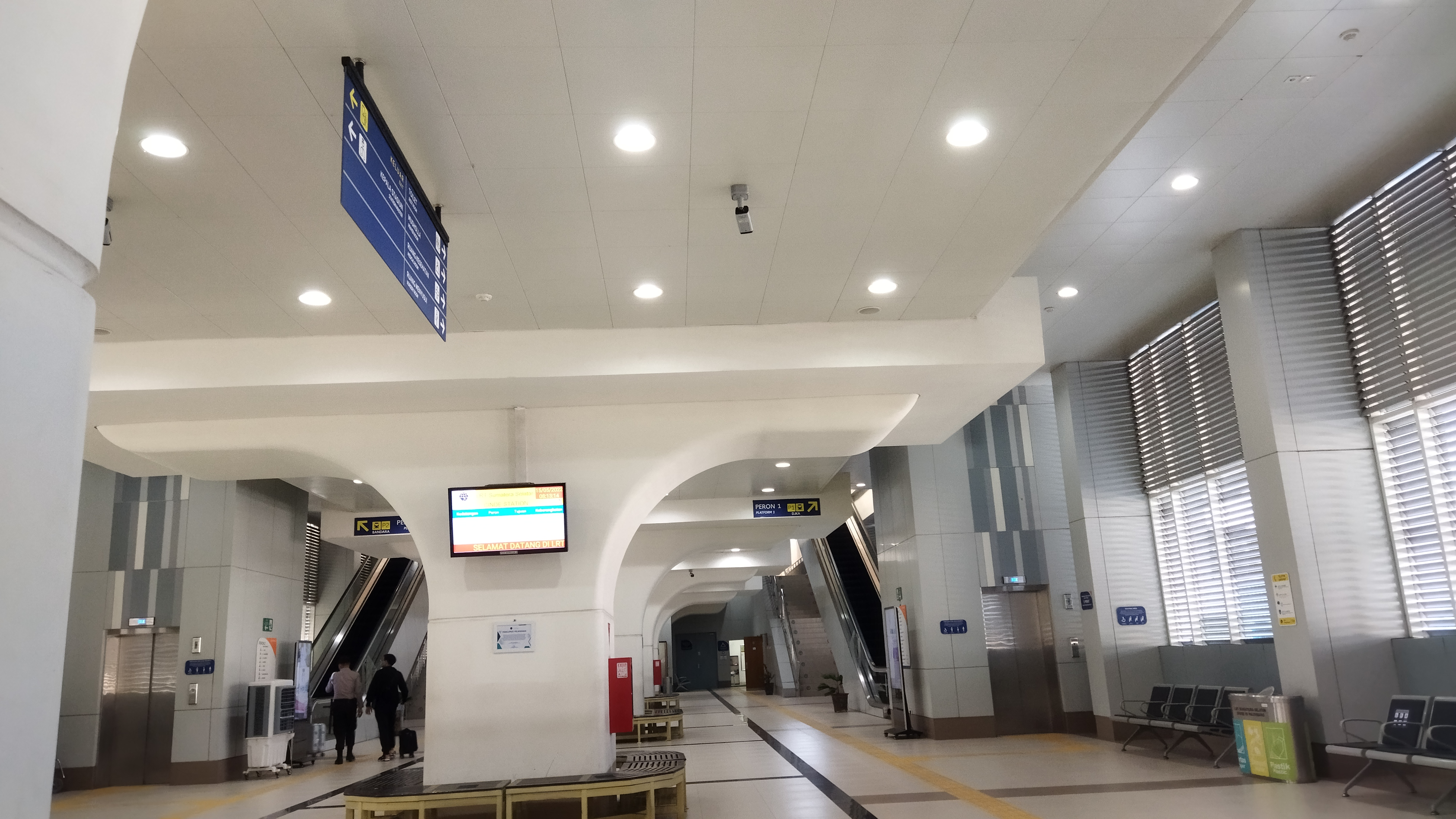
Inside Cinde LRT Station

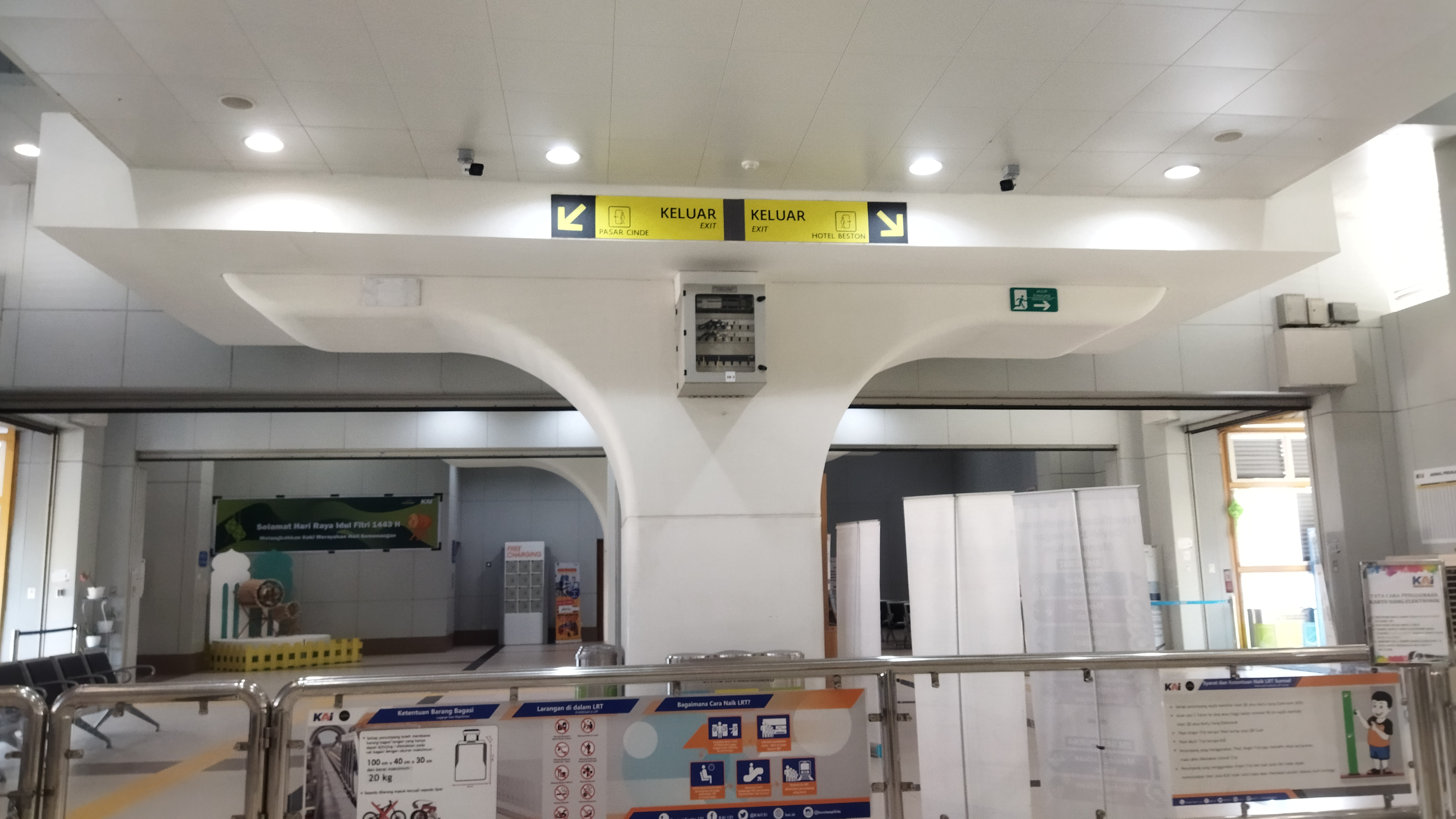
Cinde Station's interior

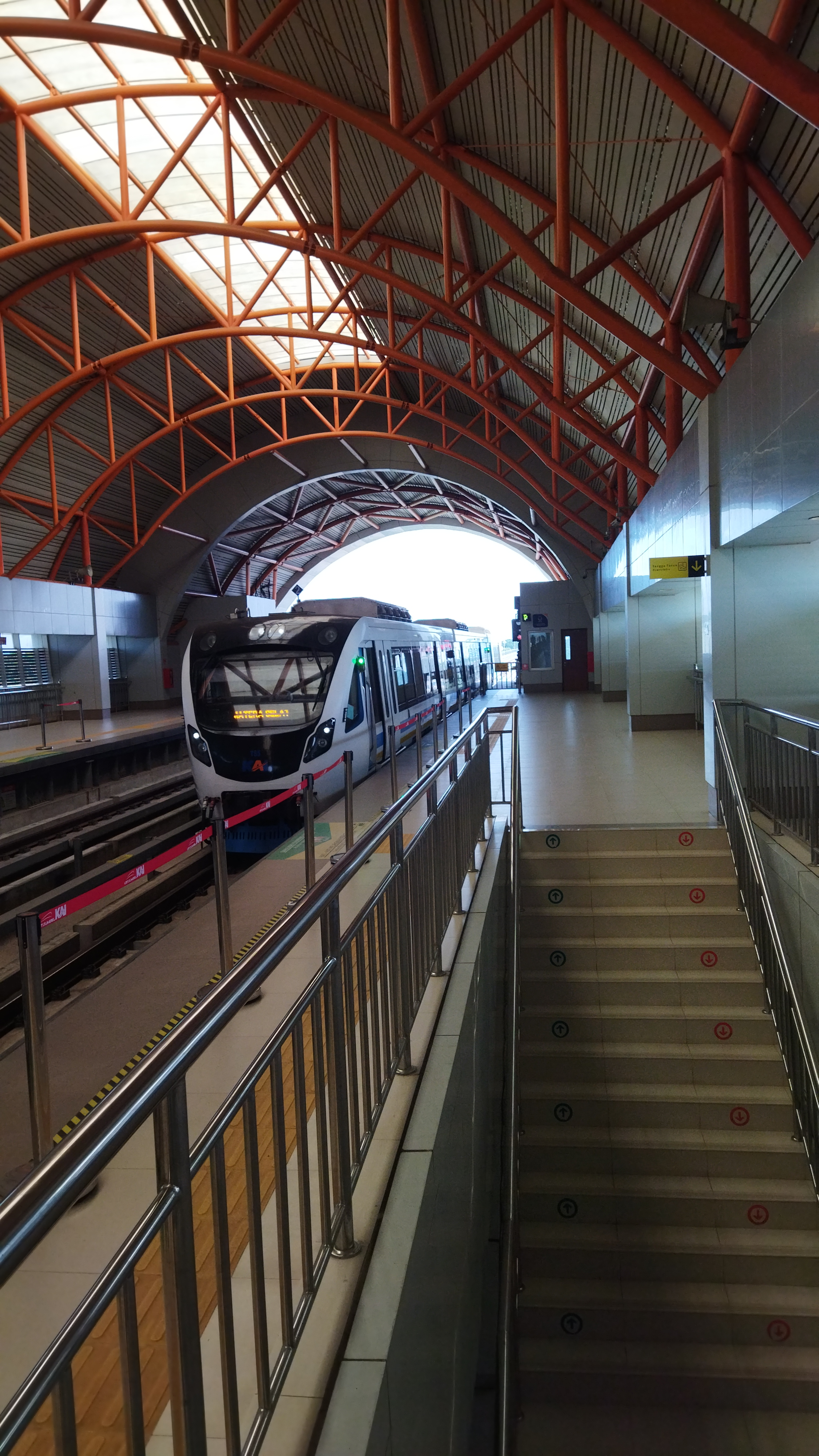
Palembang LRT train at Cinde Station
