= Polresta LRT station =

Railway station in Indonesia

P11 Polresta
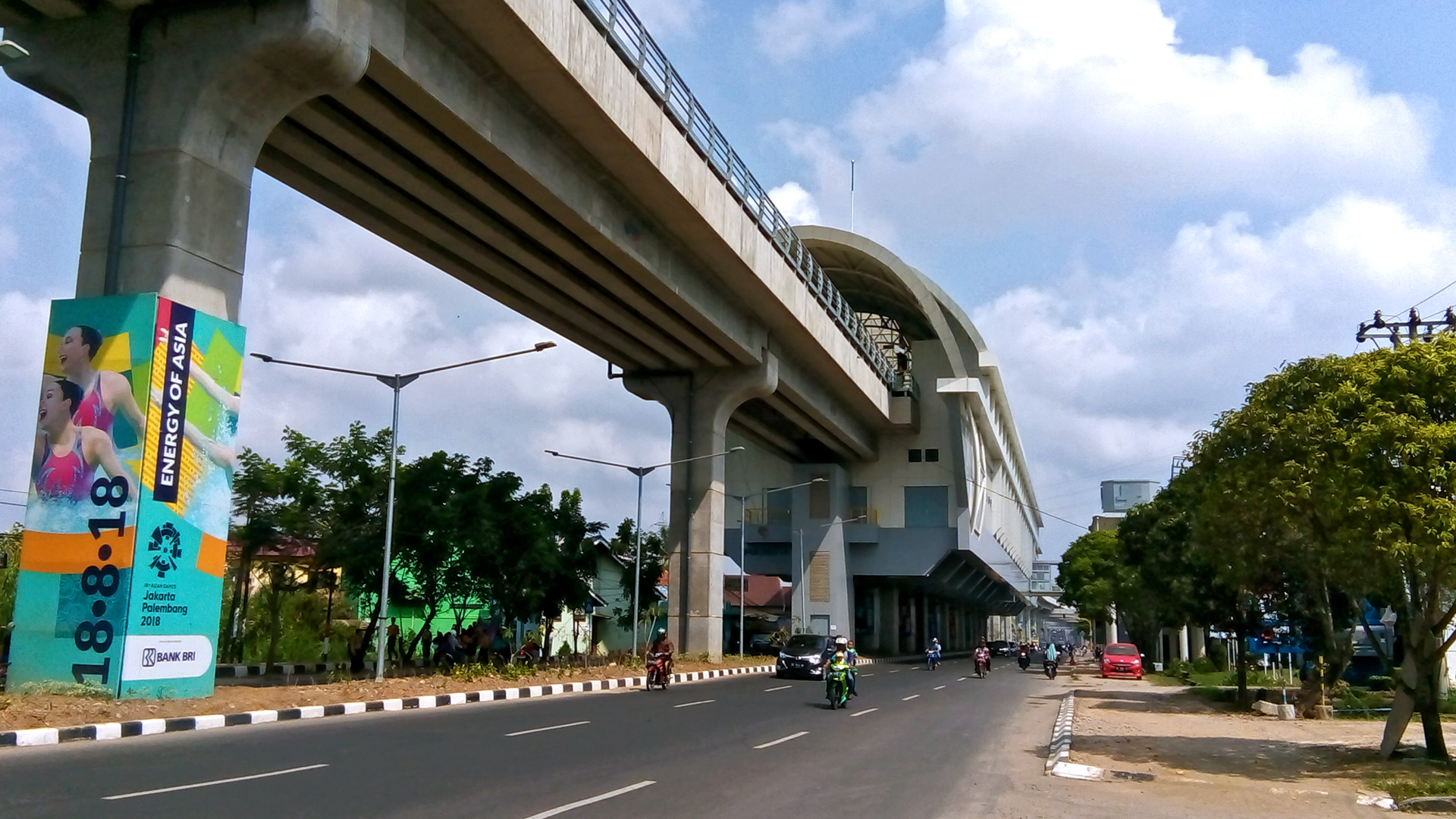
- Polresta Station, photo was taken on 30 September 2018

General information
- Location: Jl. Gubernur H. A Bastari, 8 Ulu, Seberang Ulu I, Palembang; South Sumatra; Indonesia
- Coordinates: 3.005128°S 104.772586°E
- System: Palembang LRT station
- Owner: Indonesian Railway Company
- Operator: Indonesian Railway Company
- Line: Line 1
- Platforms: 2 side platforms
- Tracks: 2

Construction
- Structure type: Elevated
- Parking: none
- Cycle facilities: none
- Accessible: Available

Other information
- Station code: POL

History
- Opened: 27 September 2018

Services
Preceding station	Palembang LRT	Following station
Ampera towards SMB II	Line 1	Jakabaring towards DJKA
Location
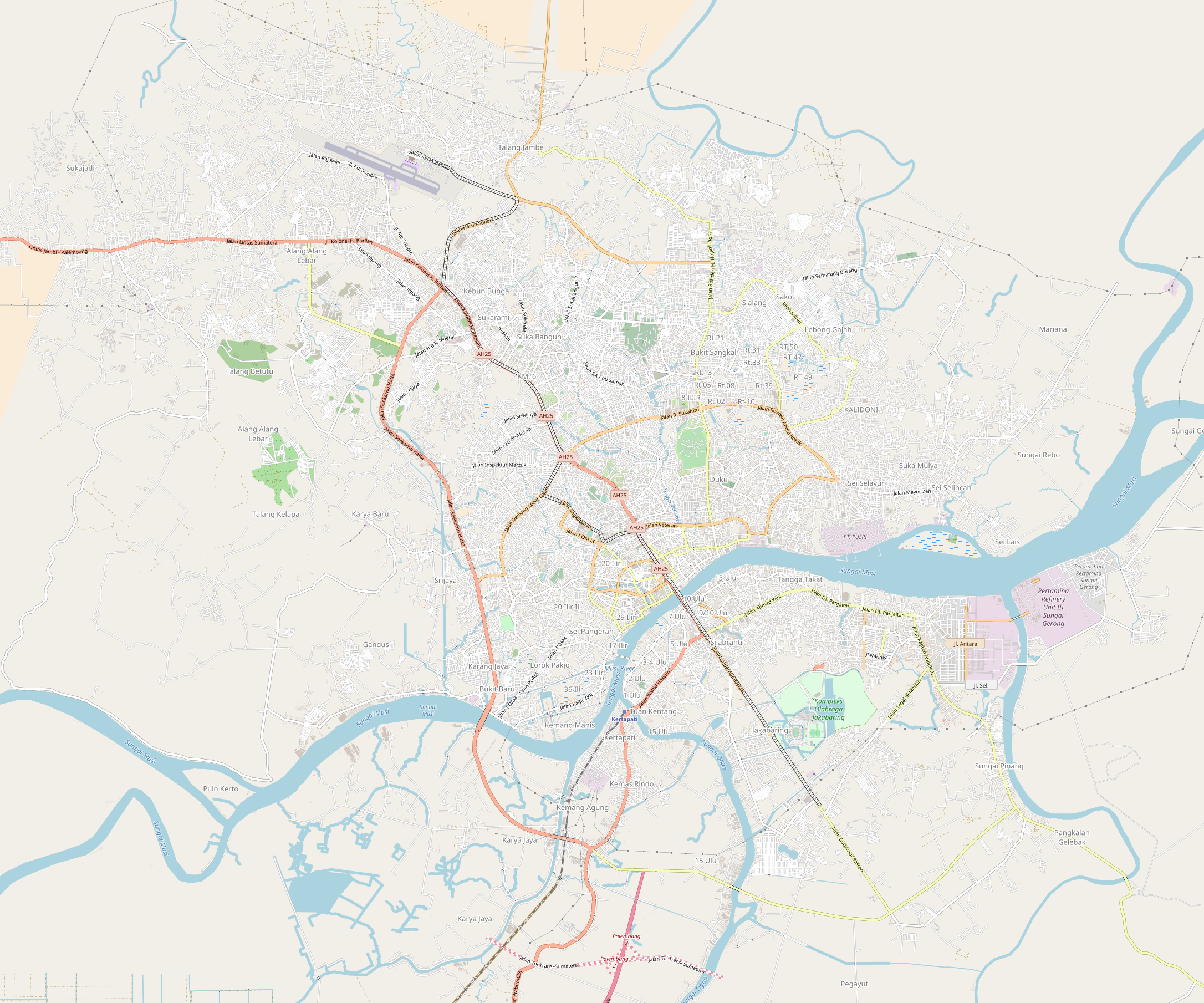
- Location within Palembang

Polresta Station is a station of the Palembang LRT Line 1. The station is located between Ampera station and Jakabaring station. Near the station is the main police station of Palembang Large City Resort Police (Kepolisian Resor Kota Besar Palembang, abbreviated as Polrestabes Palembang and, formerly, Polresta Palembang), hence its name.

The station was opened on 27 September 2018, after the 2018 Asian Games had concluded.

== Station layout ==
2F; Platforms	Side platform, doors will open on the right
2F; Platforms	Platform 1	LRT Line 1 towards DJKA →
2F; Platforms	Platform 2	← LRT Line 1 towards SMB II
2F; Platforms	Side platform, doors will open on the right
1F	Concourse	Faregates, Ticket Booths, Station Control, Shops, Musalla
G	Street Level	Parking (plan)
