= Jakabaring Sport City =

Integrated sports facility complex in Palembang, Indonesia

Coordinates: 3.021434°S 104.787673°E

Jakabaring Sport City (sic), also known as Jakabaring Sports Complex (Indonesian: Kompleks Olahraga Jakabaring) is an integrated sports facility complex in Palembang, South Sumatra, Indonesia. The complex is located 5 kilometers southeast of Palembang city center, across the Musi river by the Ampera Bridge in Jakabaring, Seberang Ulu I area.

It was the main venue of the 2011 Southeast Asian Games, the 2013 Islamic Solidarity Games, the 2014 ASEAN University Games, the 2017 Asian Triathlon Championship and the 2018 Asian Games. Gelora Sriwijaya Stadium, one of the largest stadiums in Indonesia, is located within this complex.

== Facilities ==
The sports complex was built to host 2004 Pekan Olahraga Nasional, an Indonesian national multi-sport event in which athletes from 34 Indonesian provinces participated. At that time, the complex consisted of the main stadium and two indoor sports halls, Gelora Olahraga (GOR) Dempo and Gelora Olahraga Ranau. Gelora Sriwijaya Stadium was also the host for the 2007 AFC Asian Cup. The complex was extensively expanded to host the 2011 Southeast Asian Games and 2018 Asian Games. The complex now comprises:

1. Gelora Sriwijaya Stadium
2. Dempo Sports Hall
3. Ranau Sports Hall
4. Jakabaring Athletic Stadium and Warming up Field
5. Jakabaring Aquatic Stadium
6. Jakabaring Squash Stadium
7. Jakabaring Baseball Field and Jakabaring Softball Field
8. Jakabaring Archery Field
9. Jakabaring Shooting Range
10. Jakabaring Athlete Village and Dining Hall
11. Regatta Course (Jakabaring Lake; for Outdoor Water Sport)
12. Bukit Asam Tennis Court
13. Jakabaring Bowling Center
14. Jakabaring Beach Volleyball Arena
15. Jakabaring Roller Sports Arena
16. Jakabaring Sports Climbing Arena
17. Jakabaring Petanque Arena
18. Sports Science Center

== Other Facilities ==
Other than the sports facilities there are also some facilities that being built to fit up the Sports Complex such as:

1. Sriwijaya Tourism Polytechnique
2. Six Religions House of Worship
3. Jakabaring Sports City Gardens
4. PT. JSC Main Office
5. Indonesian Sports Polytechnique
6. Lippo Plaza Jakabaring

== Access ==
The complex is connected by Palembang Light Rail Transit via Jakabaring Station to the Sultan Mahmud Badaruddin II International Airport and also served by Trans Musi Routes.
