= De-Sukarnoization =

Indonesian purging policy by the New Order

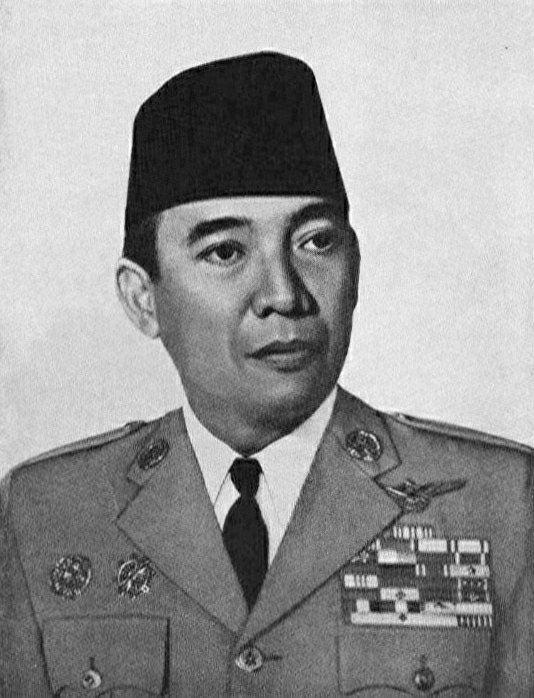
Sukarno

De-Sukarnoization, also spelled de-Soekarnoization, (Indonesian: de-Soekarnoisasi) was a policy that existed in Indonesia from the transition to the New Order in 1966 up to the beginning of the Reformation era in 1998, in which some of Sukarno's legacy and role in Indonesian history was downplayed.

== History ==
=== Background ===
Following the events of the failed coup in September/October 1965, anti-communist and anti-PKI student demonstrations started soon after. When Sukarno refused to attend the burial ceremony of the murdered generals, he seemed to have antagonized many of his followers and the ire of many in the Indonesian military. On January 10, 1966, at a major student demonstration, the students raised the Tritura, the banner bearing three mottos: dissolve the PKI, purge the Cabinet, lower the prices. A few days later, students trying to climb over a hedge of Bogor Palace carried pamphlets accusing Sukarno of protecting the PKI.

Indonesia's People's Consultative Assembly (MPRS) rejected Sukarno's presidential statements (that he gave in June 1966 and in January 1967) on his role in the October 1 affair, and ruled it as completely insufficient. On February 10, 1967, the MPRS issued a statement in which it is demanded that Sukarno is brought to justice for high treason. A few days later the High Court of Indonesia published a report of 120 pages with a similar conclusion.

In March 1967, though Sukarno still enjoyed the support of many Indonesians, the MPRS stripped Sukarno of his presidential powers. In addition, Sukarno was forbidden to take part in the forthcoming general elections, or to engage in any kind of political activity by the People's Consultative Assembly (MPRS).

=== Scope of de-Sukarnoization ===
From the beginning of 1968, Sukarno was placed under house arrest and stayed in one of the wings of the Bogor Palace. When Sukarno died in 1970, Suharto denied his request to be buried in Istana Batu Tulis in Bogor; instead, Sukarno was buried in Blitar, East Java near his mother's grave.

The New Order renamed many places that had been named after Sukarno: Gelora Bung Karno Sports Complex was renamed the "Senayan Sports Complex", the Bung Karno Bridge (Jembatan Bung Karno) was renamed Ampera Bridge; the city "Sukarnapura" (Sukarno City) was renamed "Jayapura" and "Puncak Sukarno" (Sukarno Peak) was renamed "Puncak Jaya". The only monument that was renamed back to the original name after Suharto's resignation was the Senayan Sports Complex, whereas the latter places retained the names given during the New Order.

Other efforts to reduce Sukarno's legacy included downplaying his contribution in creating the Indonesian national ideology, Pancasila. Military historian Nugroho Notosusanto instead posed that Mohammad Yamin came up first with the principles of Pancasila, while Sukarno was merely the first to use the term. This interpretation was supported by the New Order government and became the official historical interpretation taught at schools.

=== Limits of de-Sukarnoization ===
During Sukarno’s power struggle with the MPRS in 1967, many in the political elite (including MPRS speaker Abdul Haris Nasution) wanted Sukarno removed as Head of State and tried in court. However, during his opening speech to the MPRS, Suharto vouched for moderation. After a few days of debate, the MPRS (though they removed him as Head of State) allowed Sukarno to retain the title of President.

In 1980, statues of Sukarno and Mohammad Hatta (Indonesia's first vice president) were erected in Jakarta on the historical site where they proclaimed Indonesia's independence.

In 1985, Suharto instructed that the new international airport in Jakarta was to be named Soekarno–Hatta International Airport, after Sukarno and Mohammad Hatta, "in honor of the two men who proclaimed our independence to the world".

In 1986, Sukarno (and Mohammad Hatta) were given the title Heroes of the Proclamation (Pahlawan Proklamasi).
