= Gelora Sriwijaya Stadium =

Sports stadium in Indonesia

- Stadion Gelora Sriwijaya
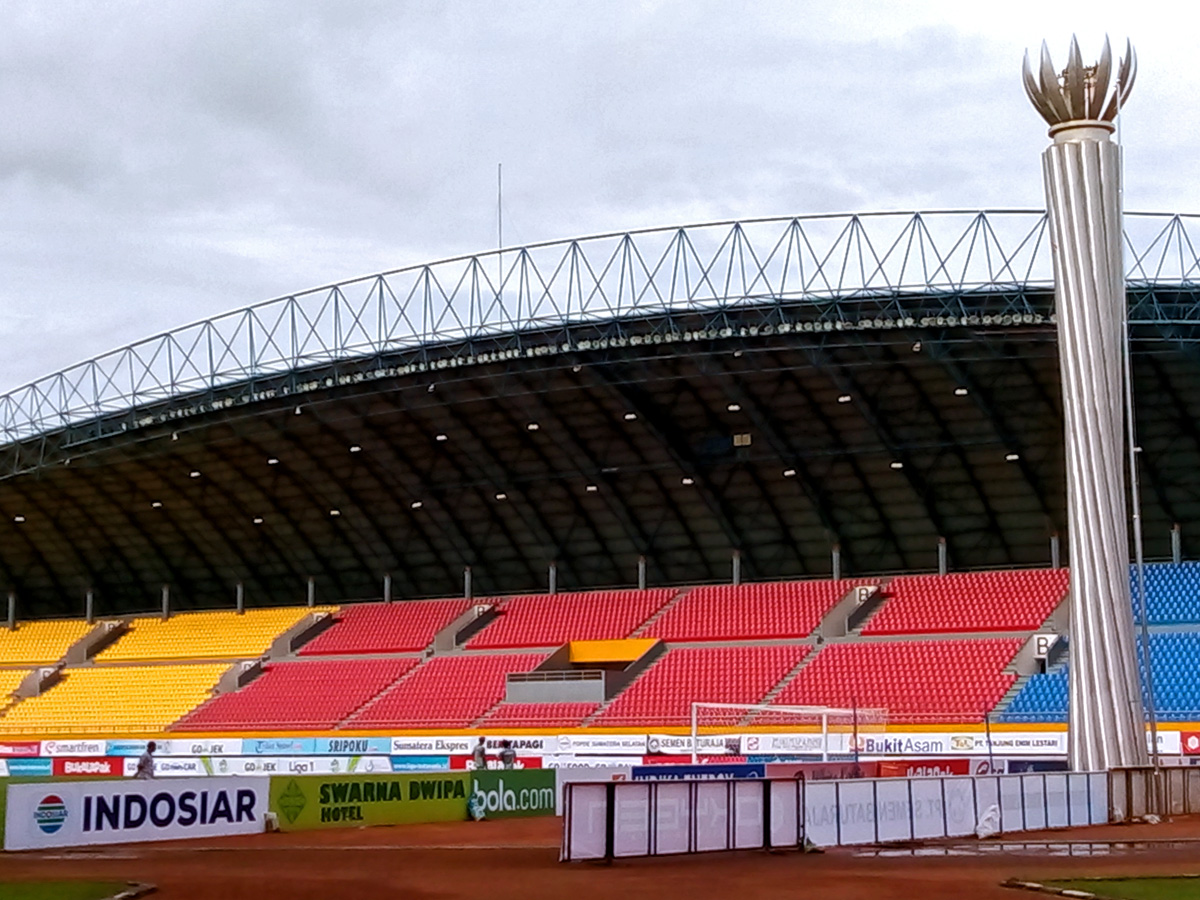
- Inside view of the stadium prior to 2021 renovation
- Interactive map of Gelora Sriwijaya Stadium
- Location: Jl. Gubernur HA Bastari, Jakabaring, Palembang, South Sumatra
- Coordinates: 3.021400°S 104.789200°E
- Owner: Government of the South Sumatra Province
- Operator: Jakabaring Sport City Management Center
- Capacity: 23,000 Capacity history: 36,000–40,000 (2004–2018) 23,000 (2018–present)
- Surface: Zoysia matrella
- Field size: 105 by 68 m (344 by 223 ft)
- Public transit: Jakabaring

Construction
- Built: 2001; 25 years ago
- Opened: 2004; 22 years ago
- Renovated: 2017, 2021

Tenants
- Sriwijaya F.C. (2004–present); Indonesia women's national football team (2018–present)

Gelora Sriwijaya Stadium, also known as Jakabaring Stadium (Indonesian: Stadion Gelora Sriwijaya; literally "Sriwijaya Sports Arena Stadium"), is a multi-purpose stadium located in Jakabaring Sport City complex in Palembang, South Sumatra, Indonesia. Holding 23,000 spectators, the stadium is currently used mostly for football matches. The construction began in 2001 and finished in 2004 to host the 2004 Indonesia National Games. The stadium was initially named as Jakabaring stadium after the location of the stadium in southern outskirt of Palembang. However, later the stadium was renamed "Gelora Sriwijaya", to honor and celebrate the 7th—13th century Indonesian empire of Srivijaya. The Third Place Playoff of the 2007 AFC Asian Cup was held in this stadium. The football club Sriwijaya is based at the stadium.

== History ==
The stadium which began construction on 1 January 2001, was intended to host the 2004 National Sports Week when the city of Palembang was appointed as the organizer on 2 September 2004. The stadium was named after the maritime empire of Srivijaya, which was based in Palembang and succeeded in unifying the western region of the archipelago in the 7th century until 12th century. In addition, this stadium is also the headquarters of Sriwijaya Football Club. AFC verification results make this stadium one of the 3 AFC standard stadiums in Indonesia.

The stadium was used as one of the stadiums that hosted matches in the 2007 AFC Asian Cup as a companion to the Gelora Bung Karno Main Stadium on the third match day and also for the third place match.

The stadium became the main stadium at the opening and closing ceremonies of the 2011 SEA Games and 2013 Islamic Solidarity Games in Palembang.

Women's football also used the stadium as a venue for various tournaments, such as the 2018 AFF Championship and the 2018 Asian Games women's football.

== Design ==
The capacity of this stadium is 23,000 spectators, with four tribune (A, B, C, and D) around the main field. The size of main soccer field is 68 x 105 metres, surrounded by eight lanes athletics track and field with red gravel surface. The main tribune on west and east side (A and B) is covered with two large steel arch. Two bulbous blue roofs supported by these arches took form of the sail of the ship, symbolizes Srivijaya as the maritime empire. On the main outer wall on west and east side adorned with songket textile motifs as the cultural identity of Palembang. The main score screen is located on southern tribune (tribune D), while the fire cauldron is located in southern side of the main field between the soccer field and athletic tracks. This stadium also contains three standard squash field.

The stadium underwent renovations prior to the 2018 Asian Games, converting it to an all-seater stadium. Shortly prior to the Games, 335 of the new seats were damaged by fans in the aftermath of a Sriwijaya loss.

== Renovation ==
In 2020, The South Sumatra Provincial Government (Pemprov) has increased the budget to IDR 20 billion to repair the renovation of the Gelora Sriwijaya Jakabaring (GSJ) Palembang Stadium in preparation for hosting the 2021 FIFA U-20 World Cup. Repairs to the main pitch of the Gelora Sriwijaya Jakabaring Stadium in Palembang has been completed. The front of the stadium has begun to be repainted. For grass that uses FIFA standards, Zoysia matrella grass, it is neat and perfect by the end of December.

In December 2020, the 2021 event was postponed until 2023, with Indonesia remaining as host. The renovation project of Gelora Sriwijaya Stadium was extended until May 2023. The renovation is focused on improving the field grass and several other components such as stadium lights and scoreboards that refer to the FIFA standards. However, Indonesia was stripped of hosting rights on 29 March 2023 due to its refusal to allow the Israel U-20 national team in the country.

== Incidents ==
Sriwijaya lost 0–3 to Arema, 335 seats were damaged due to the actions of supporters during the 2018 Liga 1 match. It is suspected that the anarchist perpetrators were in the North Stand by the Singa Mania group and the South Stand by the Sriwijaya Mania group. The Palembang Police have indicated that they will not give permission to Sriwijaya to hold a match in the near future, considering that the 2018 Asian Games are in sight. The South Sumatra Provincial Government and the Indonesian Army personnel have begun repairing the damage to the two spectator stands.

== Sporting events ==
=== International ===
- 2005 AFF U-20 Youth Championship
- 2007 AFC Asian Cup for Group D match between Saudi Arabia vs Bahrain and Third Place match between South Korea vs Japan
- 2010 AFF Suzuki Cup for Group A match between Malaysia vs Laos
- 2011 Southeast Asian Games ceremony venue.
- 2013 Islamic Solidarity Games for opening and closing along for football matches.
- 2014 ASEAN University Games main venue.
- 2018 AFF U-16 Girls' Championship
- 2018 AFF Women's Championship
- 2018 Asian Games women's football
- 2022 AFF U-18 Women's Championship
- 2023 AFF U-19 Women's Championship

=== National ===
- 2004 National Sports Week for opening and closing along for football matches (2004).
- 2008-09 Copa Indonesia for Third Place and Final match between Persipura Jayapura vs Sriwijaya.
- 2010 Indonesian Inter Island Cup for Group B and Final match between Persiwa vs Sriwijaya.
- 2014 Indonesian Inter Island Cup Final match between Arema Cronous vs Persib.
- 2014 Indonesia Super League Semifinals and Final match between Persipura Jayapura vs Persib.

== International matches hosted ==
Date	Competition	Team	Res	Team	Attendance
30 Jun 2007	International Friendly	Indonesia	2–1	Liberia XI	N/A
21 Nov 2010	International Friendly	Indonesia	6–0	Timor-Leste	N/A
24 Nov 2010	International Friendly	Indonesia	2–0	Chinese Taipei	5,000

== Tournament results ==
=== 2007 AFC Asian Cup ===
Date	Time (UTC+07)	Team #1	Res.	Team #2	Round	Attendance
18 July 2007	17:15	Saudi Arabia	4–0	Bahrain	Group D	500
28 July 2007	19:30	South Korea	0–0 (a.e.t.) (6–5 p)	Japan	Third place play-off	10,000

=== 2010 AFF Championship ===
Date	Time (UTC+07)	Team #1	Res.	Team #2	Round	Attendance
7 December 2010	19:30	Malaysia	5–1	Laos	Group stage	N/A

=== Football at the 2013 Islamic Solidarity Games ===
Date	Time (UTC+07)	Team #1	Res.	Team #2	Round	Attendance
19 September 2013	15:30	Saudi Arabia	1–1	Syria	Group stage	N/A
19 September 2013	20:45	Indonesia	1–0	Morocco	Group stage	N/A
23 September 2013	15:30	Turkey	1–1	Saudi Arabia	Group stage	N/A
23 September 2013	19:00	Morocco	3–1	Palestine	Group stage	N/A
25 September 2013	15:30	Saudi Arabia	2–2	Iraq	Group stage	N/A
25 September 2013	20:45	Palestine	2–1	Indonesia	Group stage	N/A
27 September 2013	15:30	Turkey	0–0 (a.e.t.) (6–7 p)	Indonesia	Semi-finals	N/A
27 September 2013	19:30	Morocco	1–0 (a.e.t.)	Saudi Arabia	Semi-finals	N/A
29 September 2013	15:30	Turkey	2–1	Saudi Arabia	Bronze medal match	N/A
29 September 2013	20:45	Indonesia	1–2	Morocco	Gold medal match	11,025

=== 2018 AFF Women's Championship ===
Date	Time (UTC+07)	Team #1	Res.	Team #2	Round	Attendance
1 July 2018	16:00	Philippines	0–4	Myanmar	Group stage	150
1 July 2018	19:00	Singapore	0–0	Indonesia	Group stage	200
3 July 2018	16:00	Indonesia	0–6	Vietnam	Group stage	100
3 July 2018	19:00	Singapore	0–3	Philippines	Group stage	100
5 July 2018	16:00	Vietnam	10–0	Singapore	Group stage	50
5 July 2018	19:00	Myanmar	6–1	Indonesia	Group stage	200
7 July 2018	16:00	Myanmar	7–0	Singapore	Group stage	100
7 July 2018	19:00	Philippines	0–5	Vietnam	Group stage	50
9 July 2018	16:00	Indonesia	3–3	Philippines	Group stage	50
9 July 2018	19:00	Vietnam	4–3	Myanmar	Group stage	100
11 July 2018	16:00	Vietnam	2–4	Australia U20	Semi-finals	100
13 July 2018	16:00	Myanmar	0–3	Vietnam	Third place match	100
13 July 2018	19:00	Thailand	3–2	Australia U20	Final	200

=== Football at the 2018 Asian Games – Women's tournament ===
Date	Time (UTC+07)	Team #1	Res.	Team #2	Round	Attendance
16 August 2018	15:00	South Korea	2–1	Chinese Taipei	Group A	N/A
16 August 2018	18:30	Indonesia	6–0	Maldives	Group A	N/A
17 August 2018	18:30	China	7–0	Hong Kong	Group B	N/A
19 August 2018	15:00	Maldives	0–8	South Korea	Group A	N/A
19 August 2018	18:30	Chinese Taipei	4–0	Indonesia	Group A	N/A
20 August 2018	18:30	Tajikistan	0–16	China	Group B	N/A
21 August 2018	15:00	Japan	7–0	Vietnam	Group C	N/A
21 August 2018	18:30	Indonesia	0–12	South Korea	Group A	N/A
22 August 2018	18:30	North Korea	0–2	China	Group B	N/A
24 August 2018	16:00	South Korea	5–0	Hong Kong	Quarter-finals	N/A
24 August 2018	19:30	Chinese Taipei	0–0 (a.e.t.) (4–3 p)	Vietnam	Quarter-finals	N/A
25 August 2018	16:00	Japan	2–1	North Korea	Quarter-finals	N/A
25 August 2018	19:30	China	5–0	Thailand	Quarter-finals	N/A
28 August 2018	16:00	South Korea	1–2	Japan	Semi-finals	N/A
28 August 2018	19:30	Chinese Taipei	0–1	China	Semi-finals	N/A
31 August 2018	15:00	South Korea	4–0	Chinese Taipei	Bronze medal match	N/A
31 August 2018	19:30	Japan	1–0	China	Gold medal match	N/A

== Entertainment events ==
Date	Artists	Events	Attendance
18 August 2019	Westlife	The Twenty Tour	14,579

== Transport ==
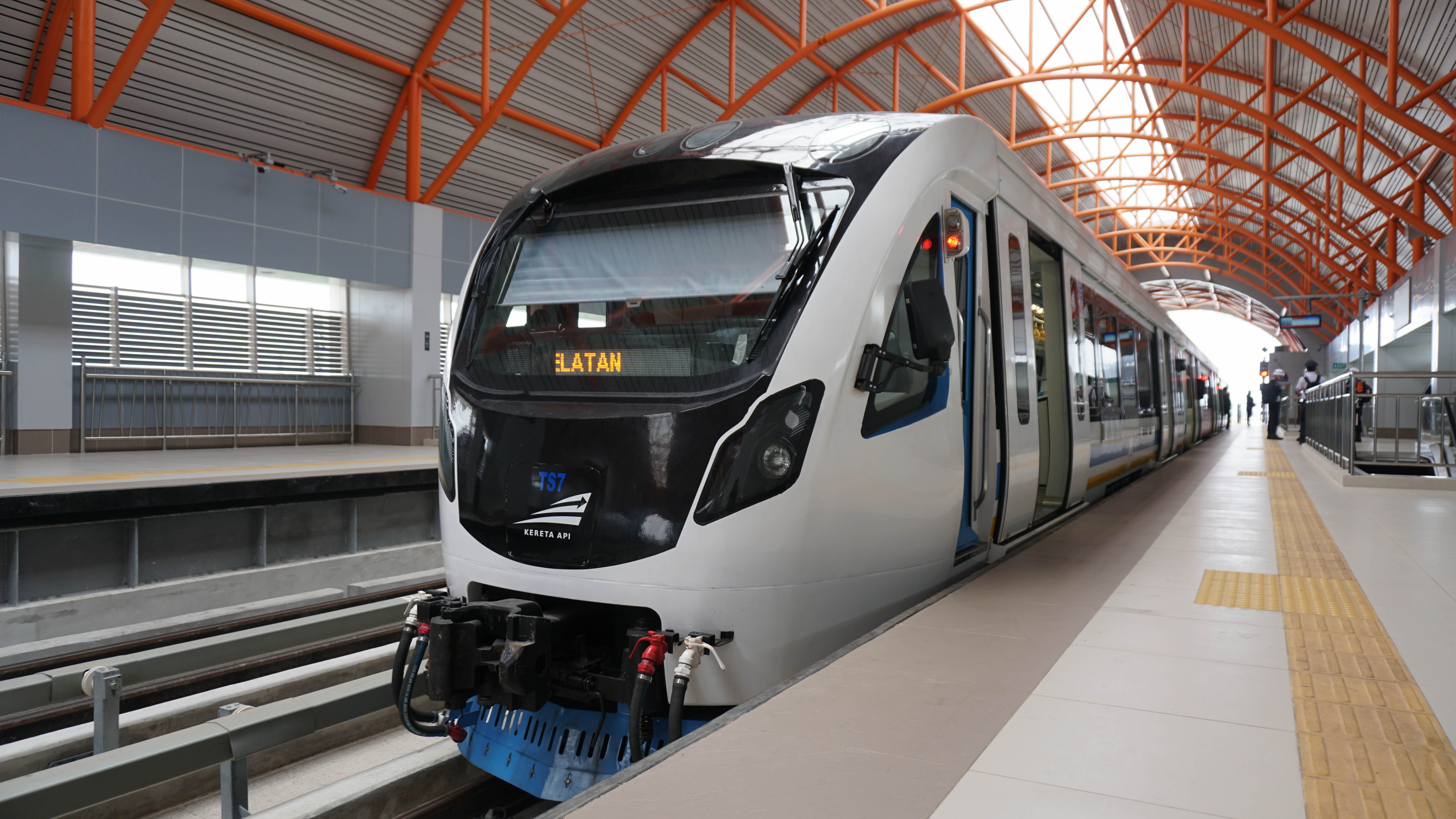
Palembang LRT, one of the public transportation that accesses the stadium complex with Jakabaring LRT station as the closest stop.

Palembang LRT provides transport service through Jakabaring LRT station within walking distance from the compound. Transmusi BRT serves this area, via the Jakabaring Terminal–Palembang Square Mall Terminal route in Corridor III, while the DAMRI BRT also serves this area, with the Jakabaring DAMRI Terminal being the closest stop to the stadium complex.

== Gallery ==
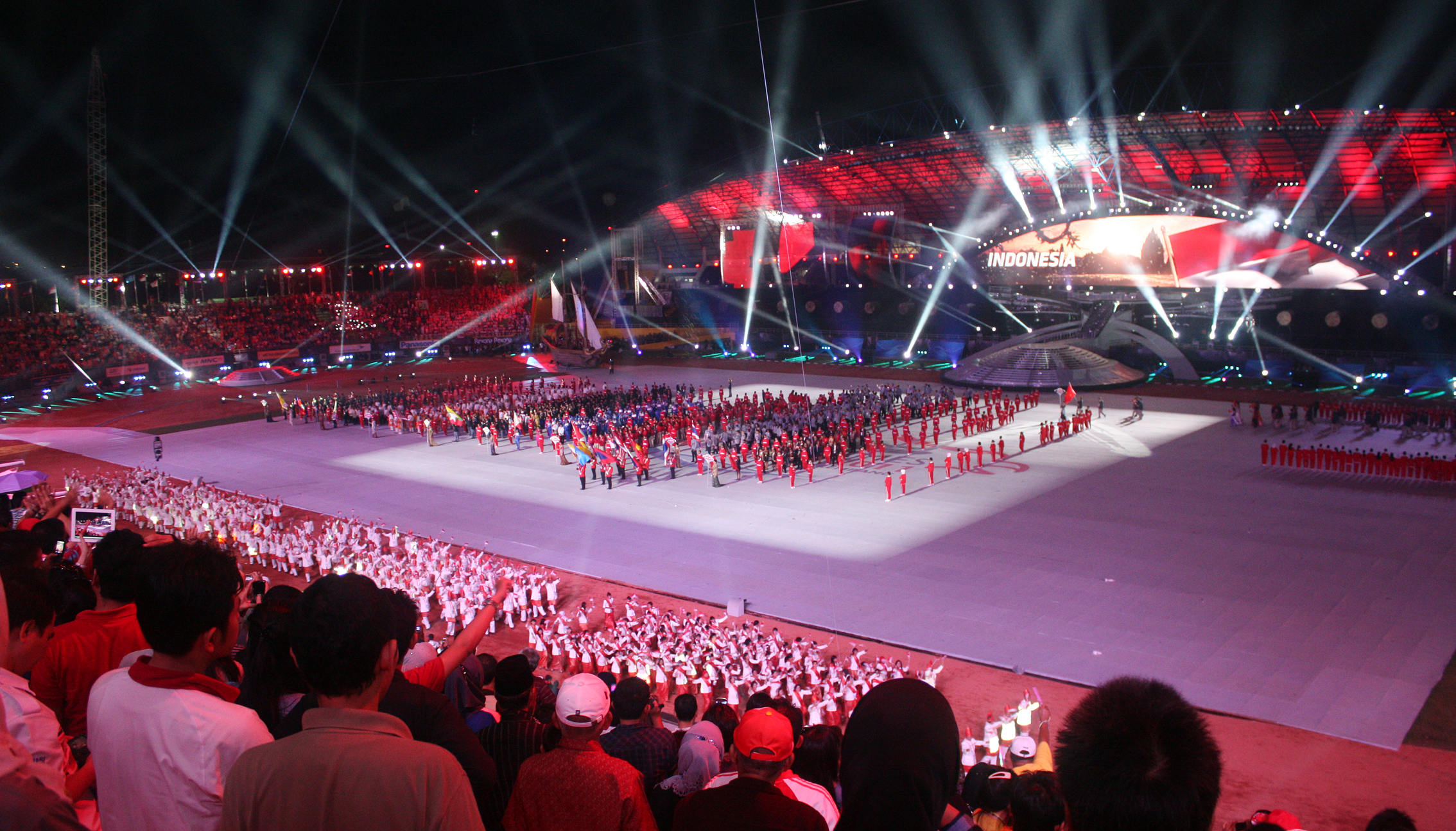
During the SEA Games 2011 opening ceremony

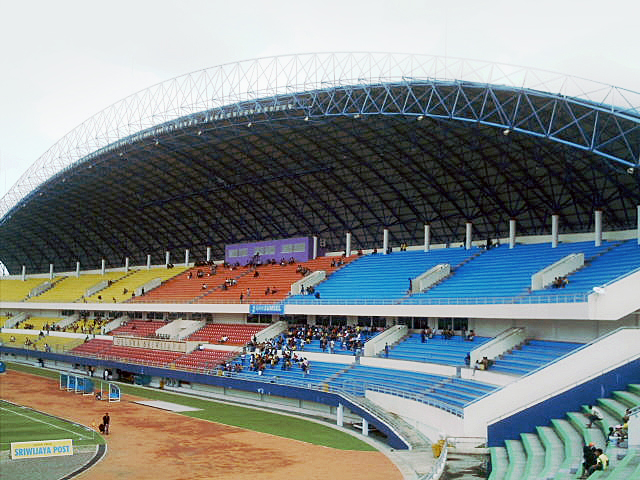
Inside view of the stadium prior to 2021 renovation

== See also ==
- List of stadiums in Indonesia
- List of stadiums by capacity

Preceded by Incheon Munhak Stadium; Incheon	Asian Games Women's Football tournament Final Venue; 2018	Succeeded by Huanglong Sports Center; Hangzhou
