= Jakabaring Aquatic Stadium =

Aquatic center in Palembang, South Sumatra, Indonesia

Jakabaring Aquatic Center
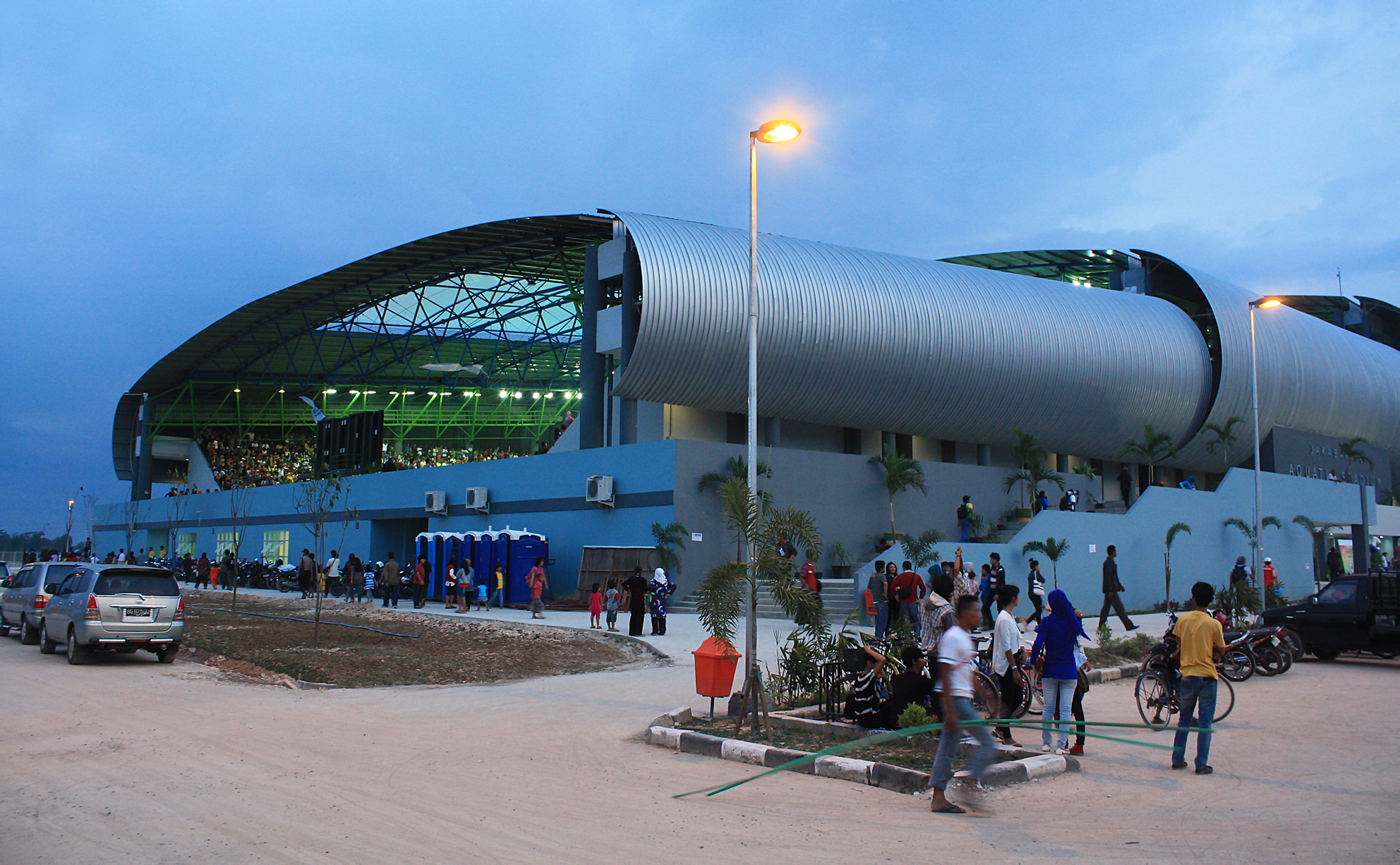
- Jakabaring Aquatic Center in Jakabaring Sport City complex.

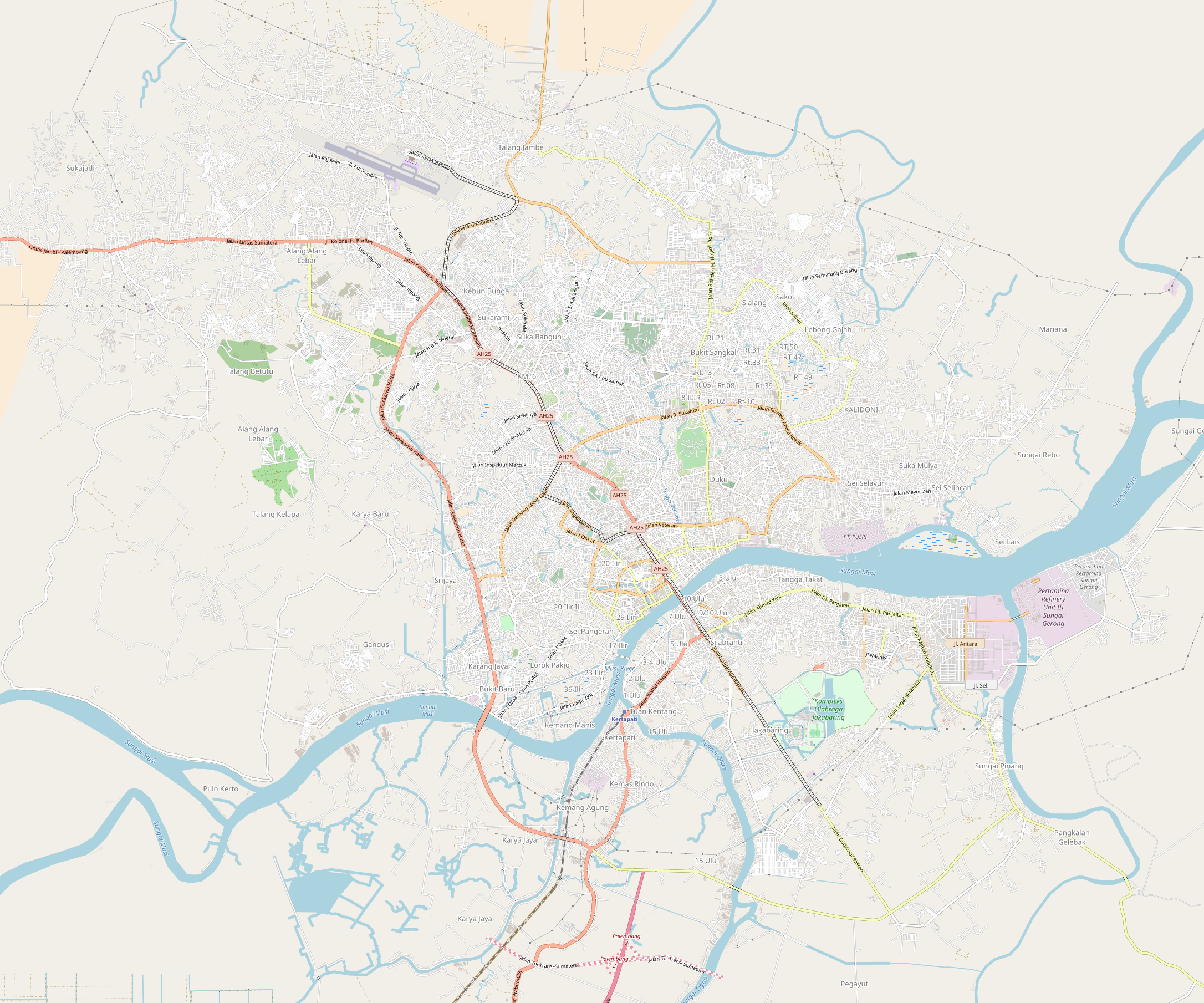
- Location in Palembang
- Location: Jl. Gubernur HA Bastari, Jakabaring, Palembang, South Sumatra
- Coordinates: 3.023825°S 104.792670°E
- Owner: Government of the South Sumatra Province
- Capacity: 3,000
- Public transit: Jakabaring

Construction
- Built: August 2010

Jakabaring Aquatic Center is a swimming, diving, and synchronised swimming venue of the 2011 Southeast Asian Games and canoe polo at the 2018 Asian Games. It lies inside the Jakabaring Sport City.
