= Ampera Bridge =

Vertical-lift bridge in Palembang, Indonesia

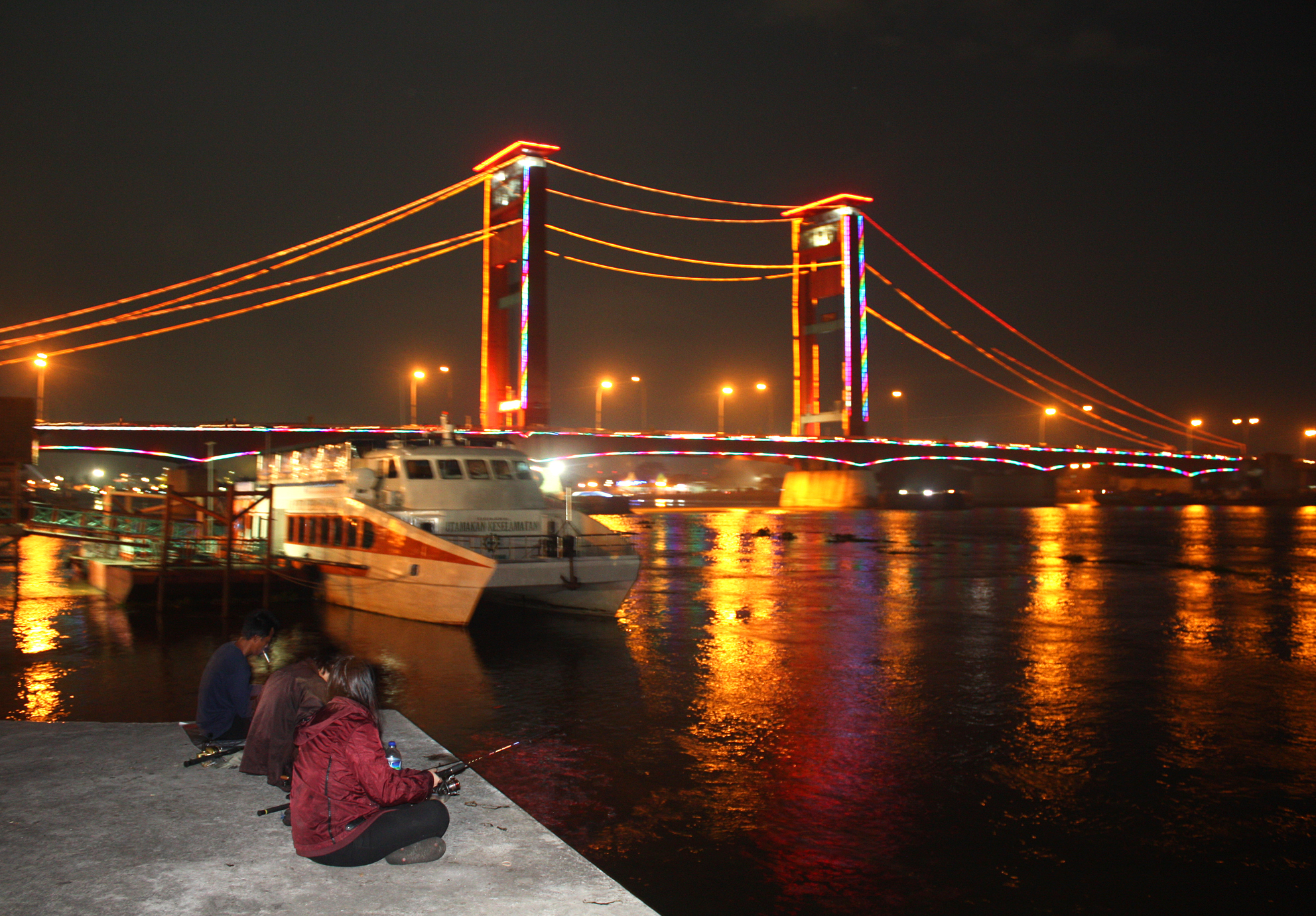
- Coordinates: 2.9917°S 104.7635°E
- Carries: Traffic, pedestrians
- Crosses: Musi River
- Locale: Palembang, South Sumatra
- Official name: Jembatan Ampera
- Other name: Bung Karno Bridge (1965-1966)

Characteristics
- Design: Vertical lift
- Total length: 224 m (735 ft)
- Longest span: 61 m (200 ft)
- Clearance below: 9 m (30 ft)

History
- Opened: 30 September 1965; 61 years ago

Location
- Interactive map of Ampera Bridge

Ampera Bridge (Indonesian: Jembatan Ampera, for Amanat Penderitaan Rakyat [Mandate of People's Suffering], a now-rarely used colloquial name for the preamble of the Constitution of Indonesia), formerly Bung Karno Bridge (Indonesian: Jembatan Bung Karno, after President Sukarno) between its opening and the 1966 De-Sukarnoization campaign, is a vertical-lift bridge in the city of Palembang, South Sumatra, Indonesia. It connects Seberang Ulu and Seberang Ilir, two regions of Palembang. It can no longer be opened to allow ships to pass.

The bridge was planned during the era of Indonesia's first president, Sukarno, who wanted a bridge that could open and be a match for London's Tower Bridge. The funds for the construction came from Japanese war reparations, with Fuji Heavy Industries being given responsibility for design and construction. However, at the time, Japan had no bridges of this type, and Fuji Heavy Industries had no bridge-building experience. The official opening was carried out by Governor of South Sumatra, Abujazid Bustomi, on 10 November 1965. At first, the bridge was known as the Bung Karno Bridge, after the president, but following his fall, it was renamed the Ampera Bridge.

For a few years after it was opened, the centre span could be lifted at a speed of approximately 10 metres per minute (33 ft/min) to allow ships of up to 44.5 metres (146 ft) in height to pass underneath. However, this only occurred a few times, and after 1970 it could no longer be opened. The official reason for this was that the 30 minutes needed to raise the bridge was causing unacceptable delays, and that in any case silting of the river had made it impassable for large ships. However, according to architect Wiratman, who acted as a consultant before the construction, the design of the bridge was flawed from the outset because of the soft mud on which it was built. He maintains that his concerns were ignored for political reasons, and that as the towers' foundations shifted, the bridge deformed to the extent that it could no longer be opened. The ballast weights needed to balance the weight of the bridge were removed in 1990 to prevent possible accidents were they to fall.

The bridge's colour has been changed three times. At first it was grey, but it was changed to be yellow in 1992. And in 2002, when Indonesia was led by Megawati Sukarnoputri as president, the colour was changed again to red.

In 2026, the bridge was designated as a national cultural heritage site by the Indonesian government due to its significant historical and cultural value.

== See also ==
- Ampera LRT station
