= Timeline of the Yuan dynasty =

This is a timeline of the Yuan dynasty (1271–1368). The Yuan dynasty was founded by the Mongol warlord Kublai Khan in 1271 and conquered the Song dynasty in 1279. The Yuan dynasty lasted nearly a hundred years before a series of rebellions known as the Red Turban Rebellion resulted in its collapse in 1368 and the rise of the Ming dynasty.

== Kublai Khan's early life ==
=== 1210s ===
Year	Date	Event
1215	23 September	Kublai Khan is born to Tolui and Sorghaghtani Beki

=== 1220s ===
Year	Date	Event
1227	18 August	Genghis Khan dies near the Jing River and Tolui becomes regent
1229	13 September	Ögedei Khan is elected ruler of the Mongol Empire at a kurultai near the Kherlen River

=== 1230s ===
Year	Date	Event
1231		"Thunder crash bombs" are employed by Jin troops in destroying a Mongol warship.
1232		Tolui is struck by sickness and dies
1232		Reusable fire lance barrels made of durable paper are employed by Jin troops during the Mongol siege of Kaifeng.
1237		Large bombs requiring several hundred men to hurl using trebuchets are employed by Mongols in the siege of Anfeng (modern Shouxian, Anhui Province).

=== 1240s ===
Year	Date	Event
1241	11 December	Ögedei Khan dies on a hunting trip after lengthy drinking and his wife Töregene Khatun becomes regent
1246	24 August	Güyük Khan is elected ruler of the Mongol Empire at a kurultai on the Kherlen River
1248	20 April	Güyük Khan dies on his way to confront Batu Khan and his wife Oghul Qaimish becomes regent

=== 1250s ===
Year	Date	Event
1251	1 July	Möngke Khan is elected ruler of the Mongol Empire at a kurultai in the Khentii Mountains
1251	fall	Möngke Khan places his brothers Hulagu Khan and Kublai Khan in charge of West Asia and China, respectively
1252	summer	Möngke Khan places Kublai Khan in charge of the invasion of the Dali Kingdom
1252	fall	Mongol forces depart from Shanxi and reach the Tao River
1252		Mongol forces under the Chinese general Wang Dechen advance into Sichuan and occupy Li Prefecture
1252		Kublai Khan advances with the main force towards the Dali Kingdom
1252		Niccolò and Maffeo Polo set off from Venice for China
1253	September	Kublai Khan's forces set up headquarters on the Jinsha River in western Yunnan and march on Dali in three columns
1253		Mongol forces occupy Li Prefecture
1253		Kublai Khan is consecrated in the Sakya school of Tibetan Buddhism
1254	January	The Dali Kingdom is conquered, although its dynasty remains in power, and the king, Duan Xingzhi, is later invested with the title of Maharajah by Möngke Khan; so ends the Dali Kingdom
1254	winter	Kublai Khan returns to Mongolia and leaves Subutai's son Uryankhadai in charge of campaigns against local Yi tribes
1254		Kublai Khan starts building an independent power base in Henan and Jingzhao where Chinese-style government is implemented
1254		Mongol raids on the northern Song border intensify
1256	summer	Möngke Khan declares war on the Song dynasty, citing imprisonment of Mongol envoys as casus belli
1256		Kublai Khan constructs a capital north of the Luan River
1257		Uriyangkhadai, son of Subutai, pacifies Yunnan and returns to Gansu
1257	winter	Mongol invasions of Vietnam: Uriyangkhadai returns to Yunnan and invades the kingdom of Đại Việt ruled by the Trần dynasty
1257		Möngke Khan launches an investigation into Kublai Khan's activities and subjects officials in Henan and Shanxi to interrogation, executes Kublai's chief pacification officer in Shanxi, and imposes large levies on Shanxi
1258		Kublai Khan returns to Mongolia to placate his brother
1258		Möngke Khan dispatches an expedition to Korea, which subjugates Goryeo and brings back the future Wonjong of Goryeo as hostage
1258	spring	Möngke Khan's forces reach Gansu
1258	spring	Đại Việt recognizes Mongol suzerainty and Trần Thái Tông sends his son as hostage to the imperial court
1258	March	Mongols capture Chengdu
1258	fall	Möngke Khan's forces reach Li Prefecture
1259		The Korean hostage is sent back to Goryeo with Mongol escorts and becomes Wonjong of Goryeo
1259	January	Möngke Khan's forces take Ya Prefecture
1259	February	Siege of Diaoyu Castle: Möngke Khan's forces lay siege to Diaoyu Fortress
1259	July	Siege of Diaoyu Castle: Möngke Khan calls off the siege of Diaoyu Fortress
1259	August	Taghachar attacks Huainan
1259	12 August	Möngke Khan dies from dysentery or a wound inflicted by a Song trebuchet, forcing Mongol campaigns throughout Eurasia and China to come to a halt
1259	September	Kublai Khan's forces cross the Yangtze and lays siege to Ezhou, however he receives news of Möngke Khan's death and Ariq Böke's mobilization, forcing hm to withdraw and deal with his brother

== Division of the Mongol Empire ==
=== 1260s ===
Year	Date	Event
1260	5 May	Kublai Khan convenes a kurultai at Kaiping, which elects him as ruler of the Mongol Empire; so ends the centralized Mongol Empire
1260	May	Toluid Civil War: Ariq Böke proclaims himself great khan of the Mongol Empire at Karakorum
1260		Toluid Civil War: Berke of the Golden Horde allies with Ariq Böke and declares war on Hulagu Khan
1260		Alghu, a grandson of Chagatai Khan, deposes Mubarak Shah, an appointee to the Chagatai Khanate of the Mongol Empire
1260		Kublai Khan's envoy Hao Jing proposes that the Song dynasty acknowledge Kublai as Son of Heaven in return for autonomy and gets jailed
1260		Kublai Khan appoints Drogön Chögyal Phagpa as Imperial Preceptor
1260		Ajall Shams al-Din Omar, from Bukhara, is appointed a commissioner of a district in north China
1260		Kublai Khan issues three currencies but the paper Jiaochao, backed by silver, prevails; total value of paper money amounts to 73,352 silver ingots
1261		Kublai Khan sends funds to Li Tan of Shandong to make war on the Song dynasty
1261		Franks visit Kublai Khan's court at Shangdu
1262	22 February	Mongol-allied warlord of Shandong, Li Tan, defects to the Song dynasty
1262	August	Kublai Khan's Chinese generals Shi Tianze and Shi Chu crush Li Tan's forces and capture him; Li Tan is trampled to death by horses
1262		Berke–Hulagu war: Berke of the Golden Horde allies with the Mamluks and invades the Ilkhanate
1262		Kublai Khan prohibits nomads' animals from roaming on farmlands
1262		Ahmad Fanakati is appointed to the Central Secretariat to direct state finances
1263		Kublai Khan reestablishes the Privy Council to oversee the Imperial Bodyguards and Kheshig
1263		The Mongols establish an administration post at Nurgan (present-day Tyr, Russia) and force the submission of the Nivkh and the Udege
1264	30 November	Mongol invasions of Sakhalin: The Mongols invade Sakhalin for the first time after Ainu attacks on their new allies the Nivkh
1264		Toluid Civil War: Kublai Khan defeats Ariq Böke
1264		Kublai Khan founds the Supreme Control Commission to administer Tibet and Buddhists
1265		Song dynasty and Mongol forces clash in Sichuan
1265		Niccolò and Maffeo Polo arrive at Kublai Khan's court
1265		Value of Jiaochao rises to 116,208 silver ingots
1266	9 July	Kublai Khan appoints his son Nomukhan Beiping Wang (prince of the pacification of the north)
1266		Kublai Khan orders the construction of Daidu, known to the Chinese as Dadu, or Khanbalikh to the Turks
1267		Drikung Kagyu rebels against the Supreme Control Commission and Kublai Khan dispatches forces to crush them
1267		Kublai Khan orders the construction of an Imperial Ancestral Temple
1267		Kublai Khan designates Xu Heng as chancellor of the Guozijian
1267		Jamal ad-Din arrives in China and brings with him sundials, an astrolobe, a terrestrial globe, a celestial globe, and a more accurate calendar
1268		Battle of Xiangyang: Mongol forces under Aju lay siege to Xiangyang
1268		The rebellion in Tibet is suppressed and Drogön Chögyal Phagpa is reinstated along with a Mongol pacification commissioner
1268		Kublai Khan creates the "General Administration for the Supervision of Ortogh" (Muslim merchant association) to lend money at low interest to the ortogh
1269		Kaidu–Kublai war: Kaidu, a grandson of Ögedei Khan, rebels against Kublai Khan
1269		Sambyeolcho Rebellion: Im Yeon engineers a coup against Wonjong of Goryeo and Kublai Khan sends 3,000 troops to vanquish the rebels and reinstate Wonjong
1269		Drogön Chögyal Phagpa invents the 41 letter 'Phags-pa script, which Kublai Khan designates as the state script
1269		Niccolò and Maffeo Polo return to Europe

=== 1270s ===
Year	Date	Event
1270		Kublai Khan founds the Institute of Muslim Astronomy

== Yuan dynasty ==
=== 1270s ===
Year	Date	Event
1271		Kublai Khan declares himself emperor of the Yuan dynasty and for the first time, annual sacrifices at the altars of Soil and Grain are done in the Chinese style
1271		Kublai Khan sends his son Nomukhan to garrison Almaliq
1271		Niccolò and Maffeo Polo as well as Marco Polo set off for China
1271		Chinese people start visiting Taiwan
1272		Battle of Xiangyang: Riverine relief forces use fire lances to repel boarders and break the Yuan blockade of Xiangyang
1273	March	Battle of Xiangyang: Lü Wenhuan surrenders Xiangyang to Yuan
1273	summer	Kublai Khan appoints Bayan of the Baarin as commander of the expeditionary forces
1273		Sambyeolcho Rebellion: The rebellion is defeated and Wonjong of Goryeo is reinstated, henceforth bringing Goryeo under Yuan as a tributary state; Yuan princesses are married into the Goryeo dynasty
1273		Kublai Khan breaks the Mongol custom of kurultai and designates his son Zhenjin as his successor
1273		Kublai Khan names Araniko Directorate General for the Management of Artisans
1274		Kublai Khan holds court at Daidu for the first time
1274		Mongol invasions of Japan: Kublai Khan sends an expedition of 15,000 Mongols, Chinese, and Jurchens along with 6,000 Koreans, as well as 7,000 Korean sailors to invade Japan. They take the islands of Tsushima and Iki before landing at Hakata Bay on the eastern coast of Kyushu.
1274	19 November	Battle of Bun'ei: The Japanese are losing at Hakata Bay until a large storm strikes. The Koreans recommend the Mongols to take shelter in their ships and head out to open sea until the storm subsides, which they do, and die. Several hundred ships are shattered and the expedition loses 13,000 lives. The remaining forces sail home.
1275	January	Bayan's forces cross the Yangtze at Hankou
1275	March	Bayan's forces meet Jia Sidao in battle at Dingjiao Prefecture and annihilate his force using artillery equipment
1275		Mongols conquer the Hanshui region
1275		Kublai Khan sends his wife's nephew Antong to assist his son Nomukhan
1275		Marco Polo arrives in China
1275		Rabban Bar Sauma and Rabban Markos set off from China for Jerusalem, eventually visiting the pope, Philip IV of France, and King Edward I in England
1276		Yuan army annihilates a Song army near modern Guichi District
1276	22 March	Lin'an surrenders to Yuan and Emperor Gong of Song is eventually moved to Dunhuang where he raises a family and becomes a monk
1276		Yuan general of Uyghur descent, Arigh Kaya, conquers Hunan and Guangxi
1276		Yuan commander Sodu occupies Fuzhou
1276	winter	Kaidu–Kublai war: Mongol princes capture Nomukhan and Antong; Nomukhan is sent to the Golden Horde and Antong to Kaidu
1276		Fire lances are used by Song cavalry in combating Mongols.
1276		Value of Jiaochao rises to 1,419,665 silver ingots
1277	April	Battle of Ngasaunggyan: A Yuan expedition led by Nasr al-Din to invade the Pagan Kingdom scores a victory but fail to capture their king, Narathihapate
1277		Muslim superintendent of Quanzhou Pu Shougeng defects to Yuan
1277		A suicide bombing occurs in China when Song garrisons set off a large bomb, killing themselves.
1278	February	Yuan commander Sodu occupies Guangzhou
1279	19 March	Battle of Yamen: Yuan fleet annihilates the Song fleet and Zhao Bing dies at sea; so ends the Song dynasty
1279		Kublai Khan defeats rebel princes in Mongolia

=== 1280s ===
Year	Date	Event
1280		Drogön Chögyal Phagpa dies and Sangha enters Tibet to restore order
1280		"Eruptors," cannons firing co-viative projectiles, are employed in the Yuan dynasty.
1280		A major accidental explosion occurs in China when a Yuan gunpowder storehouse at Weiyang, Yangzhou catches fire and explodes, killing 100 guards and hurling building materials over 5 km away.
1281		Mongol invasions of Japan: A combined force of 100,000 troops, 15,000 Korean sailors, and 900 boats are prepared to invade Japan
1281	spring	40,000 troops from north China set off for Japan
1281	June	Northern forces occupy Iki Island
1281	June	Southern forces from Fujian depart for Kyushu
1281	15 August	Battle of Kōan: A typhoon strikes Kyushu and half of the Mongol forces die in the process
1281		Bombs are employed by Mongols in the Mongol invasions of Japan.
1281		Kublai Khan dispatches Sodu to lead a naval invasion of Champa due to their king Indravarman V's refusal to accompany a tribute mission to the Yuan court
1281		Chen Guilong rebels against Mongol rule and rebellion breaks out in Fujian; both are defeated
1281		Kublai Khan's wife Chabi dies
1282	10 April	Ahmad Fanakati is killed by Chinese conspirators and replaced by Lu Shirong
1283	17 February	Mongol invasions of Vietnam: Sodu's fleet invade kingdom of Champa
1284		Nomukhan and Antong are released once their captives realize they're not getting a ransom
1285	27 January	Mongol invasions of Vietnam: Sodu and Kublai Khan's grandson Toghon invade Đại Việt (Trần dynasty) due to its refusal to allow passage for Yuan soldiers to invade Champa; the campaign ends unsuccessfully and Sodu is killed
1285	9 June	The Mongol campaign against the Vietnamese and the Cham ended unsuccessful, Yuan troops retreat to China.
1285		Drikung Kagyu rebels in Tibet
1285		Kublai Khan's son Zhenjin dies
1285		Lu Shirong is arrested for cronyism
1286		Mongol invasions of Sakhalin: Mongols under the command of Tata'erdai (塔塔兒帶) and Yangwuludai (楊兀魯帶) numbering up to 10,000 men invade Sakhalin and eventually reach the southern tip of the island
1287		Battle of Pagan: Esen-Temür defeats the Pagan Kingdom and overthrows Narathihapate; Pagan becomes a Yuan tributary
1287		Nayan, a descendant of Temüge, rebels against Kublai Khan, who personally sets out with commanders Öz-Temür and Li Ting to end it
1287		Hand cannons are employed by the troops of Jurchen Yuan commander Li Ting in bombarding Nayan's troops.
1287	24 July	Shigtür invades Liaoning but is defeated
1288	January	Mongol invasions of Vietnam: Toghon invade Đại Việt (Trần dynasty) by land and Omar invade by sea with reinforcements of 94,000 troops.
1288	30 March	Mongol invasions of Vietnam: Toghon's forces retreat back to China.
1288	9 April	Battle of Bạch Đằng (1288): Vietnamese forces under Prince Trần Hưng Đạo ambush and destroy Omar's fleet. Despite that, Vietnamese king Trần Nhân Tông accepts the supremacy of the Yuan dynasty by become tributary in order to avoid further conflicts.
1288	winter	Nayan's rebellion is defeated
1288		The Heilongjiang hand cannon is dated to this year based on contextual evidence and its proximity to the rebellion by Mongol prince Nayan, although it contains no inscription.
1289	February	Expansion of the Grand Canal is completed, connecting the Qinging River and Linqing River in Shandong

=== 1290s ===
Year	Date	Event
1290		Kublai Khan sends his grandson Buqa-Temür to Tibet to defeat the rebellious Drigung Monastery and restore Yuan authority
1292		Mongol invasion of Java: Yuan forces invade Java and experience initial success but are betrayed and ambushed by Raden Wijaya, forcing them to flee before the monsoon winds end
1292		Marco Polo leaves China
1292		The Yuan dynasty sends an expedition to Liuqiu, which may or may not be Taiwan
1294	18 February	Kublai Khan dies in his palace
1294	14 April	Temür Khan, grandson of Kublai Khan, becomes emperor of the Yuan dynasty at a kurultai held in Shangdu
1294	10 May	Temür Khan announces his will to preserve the pattern of his grandfather's reign at his enthronement ceremony
1297		The Yuan dynasty sends an expedition to Liuqiu, which may or may not be Taiwan
1297		Mongol invasions of Sakhalin: The Ainu retaliate against the Mongols and make raids into the Amur Estuary before being repelled near Lake Kizi
1298	Winter	Duwa of the Chagatai Khanate defeats Yuan forces in Mongolia and captures Temür Khan's son in law, Körgüz
1298		The Xanadu Gun, the oldest confirmed extant hand cannon, is dated to this year based on its inscription and contextual evidence.
1299		Külüg Khan is appointed commander
1299		Yuan government's finances deteriorate substantially and is forced to fund its expenditures through monetary reserves

=== 1300s ===
Year	Date	Event
1300		Second Mongol invasion of Burma: Yuan attacks the Myinsaing Kingdom
1300	fall	Kaidu–Kublai war: Yuan forces defeat Kaidu south of the Altai Mountains
1301	September	Kaidu–Kublai war: Duwa and Kaidu suffer injuries in battle with Yuan forces east of the Altai Mountains and Kaidu dies soon after
1301		Second Mongol invasion of Burma: Yuan forces fail to defeat the Myinsaing Kingdom
1301		Yuan forces invade the Shan state of Babai-Xifu for dethroning a king who recognized Yuan suzerainty
1303		Yuan campaign against Babai-Xifu ends in failure
1304		Temür Khan, Chapar Khan of the House of Ögedei, and Duwa of the Chagatai Khanate send envoys to the Ilkhanate to establish peace and restore unity among Mongols; Chagatai Khanate becomes a Yuan tributary
1306		Temür Khan sends Külüg Khan to aid Duwa in his war against Chapar Khan
1307	10 February	Temür Khan dies
1307	4 April	Ayurbarwada Buyantu Khan, brother of Külüg Khan, takes Daidu
1307	21 June	Külüg Khan, nephew of Temür Khan, becomes emperor of the Yuan dynasty at Shangdu; Ayurbarwada Buyantu Khan becomes heir apparent
1307		Chapar Khan is defeated and Duwa installs his brother Yangichar as puppet
1308		Mongol invasions of Sakhalin: The Ainu makes peace with the Mongols and promise to send tribute annually

=== 1310s ===
Year	Date	Event
1310		Chapar Khan surrenders to Yuan
1311	27 January	Külüg Khan dies
1311	30 January	Ayurbarwada Buyantu Khan purges Külüg Khan's administration and establishes Confucian rule
1311	7 April	Ayurbarwada Buyantu Khan, brother of Külüg Khan, becomes emperor of the Yuan dynasty
1311	Winter	Ayurbarwada Buyantu Khan attempts to curtail aristocratic privileges and centralize government power
1313		A new examination system based on Neo-Confucianism is promulgated; racial and elite quota system is implemented to limit successful examination candidates to 100 per metropolitan exam, and as a result ranked officials recruited through the examinations only amount to 4% of the Yuan bureaucracy
1315	Fall	Cai Wuqiu rebels in Jiangxi and is suppressed
1315		The triennial imperial examinations are reestablished
1316		Esen Buqa–Ayurbarwada war: Conflict breaks out between the Chagatai Khanate and the Yuan dynasty and Ilkhanate
1317		Centralization policies fail and princes regain autonomy
1318		Esen Buqa–Ayurbarwada war: Esen Buqa I dies

=== 1320s ===
Year	Date	Event
1320	1 March	Ayurbarwada Buyantu Khan dies
1320	19 April	Gegeen Khan, son of Ayurbarwada Buyantu Khan, becomes emperor of the Yuan dynasty
1323	4 September	The Asud Guard murder Gegeen Khan and the conspirators seize Daidu
1323	4 October	Yesün Temür, cousin of Gegeen Khan, becomes emperor of the Yuan dynasty
1323		The Comprehensive Institutions of the Great Yuan is promulgated, consisting of 2,400 legal documents divided into 4 categories
1325		Bronze "thousand-ball thunder-cannons" on four wheeled carriages appear in the Yuan dynasty.
1328	15 August	Yesün Temür dies in Shangdu
1328	8 September	El Temür seizes Daidu
1328	October	Ragibagh Khan, son of Yesün Temür, becomes emperor of the Yuan dynasty in Shangdu
1328	16 October	Jayaatu Khan Tugh Temür, son of Külüg Khan, is enthroned in Daidu
1328	14 November	War of the Two Capitals: Jayaatu Khan Tugh Temür's forces take Shangdu and defeat Ragibagh Khan, who disappears
1328	December	War of the Two Capitals: Loyalist rebels in Shanxi are defeated
1329	27 February	Khutughtu Khan Kusala, brother of Jayaatu Khan Tugh Temür, enthrones himself as emperor of the Yuan dynasty north of Karakorum
1329	May	War of the Two Capitals: Loyalist rebels in Sichuan are defeated
1329	26 August	Khutughtu Khan Kusala meets with his brother Jayaatu Khan Tugh Temür at Onggachatu
1329	30 August	Khutughtu Khan Kusala is found dead
1329	8 September	Jayaatu Khan Tugh Temür assumes the throne at Shangdu for the second time

=== 1330s ===
Year	Date	Event
1330		Jayaatu Khan Tugh Temür becomes the first Yuan emperor to perform suburban offerings to Heaven
1331	June	The Jingshi Dadian (Grand Canon for Governing the World) is completed
1332	March	War of the Two Capitals: Loyalist rebels in Yunnan are defeated
1332	2 September	Jayaatu Khan Tugh Temür dies
1332	13 October	Rinchinbal Khan, nephew of Jayaatu Khan Tugh Temür, becomes emperor of the Yuan dynasty
1332	14 December	Rinchinbal Khan dies
1333	19 July	Toghon Temür, brother of Rinchinbal Khan, becomes emperor of the Yuan dynasty in Shangdu
1335		Bayan of the Merkid abolishes the imperial examinations
1338		Zhou Ziwang proclaims himself emperor and gets apprehended
1339		A frustrated Chinese clerk by the name of Fan Meng carries out a mass murder of officials and seizes Bianliang, the capital of Henan, but is soon defeated. This event triggers a general purge of Chinese from sensitive bureaucratic positions.

=== 1340s ===
Year	Date	Event
1340		Toqto'a of the Merkit comes to power as chancellor
1340		A "watermelon bomb" containing miniature rockets known as "ground rats" is employed by Liu Bowen against rebels and pirates in Zhejiang.
1341		More than 300 uprising occur in Hunan, Hubei, Shandong, and southern Hebei
1344	June	A series of local rebellions break out in scattered areas of China
1344	June	Toqto'a resigns
1344	summer	1344 Yellow River flood: The Yellow River shifts course and eventually settles north of the Shandong peninsula, causing widespread droughts along the Huai River valley while flooding the north, making the Grand Canal impassable
1345		Yuan government sends out 12 investigation teams to "create benefits and remove harm" for the people
1345		Ibn Battuta arrives at Quanzhou
1346		Ibn Battuta leaves China
1348		Tai Situ Changchub Gyaltsen rebels in Nêdong
1348		The pirate Fang Guozhen rebels in Zhejiang, blocking maritime grain shipments
1348		Yang Weizhen remarks upon the population imbalance between northern China and southern China, noting that the population of one northern county is equal to a single southern Chinese lineage
1349		Wang Dayuan provides the first account of a visit to Taiwan and also notes substantial settlements of Chinese traders and fishermen on the Penghu Islands

=== 1350s ===
Year	Date	Event
1350		Cast iron technology becomes reliable enough to make one-piece iron cannons in China.
1350		Flintlock and wheellock mechanisms are employed in igniting land mines and naval mines in China.
1350		In China organ guns appear.
1350		Two wheeled gun carriages appear in China.
1351	April	Toqto'a mobilizes 20,000 troops and 150,000 commoners under the direction of Jia Lu to stabilize the Yellow River and dredge the Grand Canal where it had become filled with silt
1351	summer	Red Turban Rebellion: Rebellion breaks out along the Huai River valley
1351	December	Work on the Yellow River is completed
1351		Red Turban Rebellion: Xu Shouhui proclaims himself Emperor of Tianwan in Hubei
1352	spring	Red Turban Rebellion: Guo Zixing and Sun Deya (孫德崖) rebel in Haozhou
1352	15 April	Red Turban Rebellion: Zhu Yuanzhang becomes a rebel under Guo Zixing's command in Haozhou
1352		Red Turban Rebellion: Liu Futong conquers southern Henan
1352		Red Turban Rebellion: Peng Da and Zhao Junyong take Xuzhou
1352	23 October	Red Turban Rebellion: Toqto'a retakes Xuzhou; Peng Da and Zhao Junyong flee to Haozhou
1352		Red Turban Rebellion: Chaghan Temür defeats rebels in Anhui and Henan; Li Siqi rises to power in southern Henan and moves to Shanxi
1352		Red Turban Rebellion: Tianwan rebels capture Wuchang and Hanyang
1353		Red Turban Rebellion: Yuan forces retake Zhejiang, Jiangxi, Wuchang and Hanyang, forcing the Tianwan rebels to become fugitives in Hubei
1353		Red Turban Rebellion: Zhu Yuanzhang receives an independent command from Guo Zixing and captures Chuzhou
1353		Red Turban Rebellion: Zhang Shicheng rebels in Jiangsu
1354		Tai Situ Changchub Gyaltsen defeats the Dpon-chen's forces and declares the Phagmodrupa dynasty
1354		Red Turban Rebellion: Zhang Shicheng proclaims himself King of Zhou in Gaoyou
1354	winter	Red Turban Rebellion: Toqto'a lays siege to Gaoyou
1355	January	Red Turban Rebellion: Toqto'a is dismissed by Toghon Temür and the siege of Gaoyou dissolves
1355	16 March	Red Turban Rebellion: Han Lin'er is declared emperor of the Red Turban Song at Bozhou
1355	11 July	Red Turban Rebellion: Zhu Yuanzhang crosses the Yangtze
1355		Red Turban Rebellion: Guo Zixing dies and his eldest son succeeds him, but he also dies, making Zhu Yuanzhang leader of the rebels
1356	March	Red Turban Rebellion: Zhang Shicheng takes Suzhou
1356	10 April	Red Turban Rebellion: Zhu Yuanzhang takes Nanjing
1356	summer	Red Turban Rebellion: Zhang Shide, Zhang Shicheng's brother, captures Hangzhou but is forced to withdraw
1356		Red Turban Rebellion: Fang Guozhen amasses over a thousand ships and establishes control over Qingyuan, Taizhou, Wenzhou, Ningbo, and Shaoxing
1356		Red Turban Rebellion: Ni Wenjun leads Tianwan to capture Hanyang
1357	summer	Red Turban Rebellion: Zhang Shide is captured by Zhu Yuanzhang and starves to death
1357		Red Turban Rebellion: Zhang Shicheng surrenders to Yuan in return for autonomy
1357		Red Turban Rebellion: Tianwan rebels conquer Hunan and Hubei
1357		Red Turban Rebellion: Ni Wenjun is murdered and replaced by Chen Youliang, who sets up base in Jiujiang
1357		Red Turban Rebellion: Ming Yuzhen, originally a Tianwan rebel, conquers Sichuan and declares the Great Xia
1357		Ispah rebellion: Muslims rebel in Quanzhou
1358	11 July	Red Turban Rebellion: Liu Futong of the Red Turban Song captures Kaifeng and Mao Gui makes an unsuccessful attempt to take Daidu
1358	10 September	Red Turban Rebellion: Chaghan Temür takes Kaifeng;
1358		Red Turban Rebellion: Chen Youliang takes Anqing and Nanchang
1358		Red Turban Rebellion: Defending garrisons fire cannons en masse at the siege of Shaoxing and defeat Zhu Yuanzhang's forces
1359	January	Red Turban Rebellion: Shangdu is destroyed by Chinese rebels

=== 1360s ===
Year	Date	Event
1360		Red Turban Rebellion: Chen Youliang murders Xu Shouhui and proclaims the Great Han at Wuchang before attacking Zhu Yuanzhang at Nanjing only to be repulsed
1360		Chen Youding takes control of Fujian
1360		Basalawarmi takes control of Yunnan
1361		Red Turban Rebellion: Yuan forces in southwest Shandong surrender to rebel forces
1361		Tao Zongyi notes in his Persuasion of the Suburbs (t 《說郛》, s 《说郛》, Shuōfú) that Han women are ashamed when not practicing foot binding.
1362		Red Turban Rebellion: Chaghan Temür is murdered by rebels while on his way to Yidu
1362		Köke Temür, nephew of Chaghan Temür, captures Yidu and takes control of northern China from Shandong to Shanxi
1363	30 August - 4 October	Battle of Lake Poyang: Chen Youliang's fleet is demolished by Zhu Yuanzhang's forces and dies
1363	autumn	Red Turban Rebellion:Zhang Shicheng rebels, proclaiming himself the Prince of Wu, destroys Song in Bozhou, and takes Hangzhou and northern Zhejiang
1363		Red Turban Rebellion: Zhu Yuanzhang saves Han Lin'er and moves the Song court west of Nanjing where it remains militarily insignificant
1363		He Zhen retakes Guangzhou from pirates
1363		Bolad Temür is defeated by Köke Temür and flees
1364		Bolad Temür seizes control of Daidu and Biligtü Khan Ayushiridara flees to Köke Temür's court
1365	August	Bolad Temür is assassinated on the order of Toghon Temür
1365	autumn	Red Turban Rebellion: Zhu Yuanzhang attacks Zhang Shicheng
1365		Shanxi warlords Li Siqi, Zhang Liangbi, Törebeg, and Kong Xing wage war on Köke Temür in Henan
1366		He Zhen becomes provincial governor of Guangzhou
1366		Red Turban Rebellion: Ming Yuzhen dies and is succeeded by his son Ming Sheng
1366		Ispah rebellion: Muslim rebels are defeated by Chen Youding, a Yuan loyalist
1367	January	Red Turban Rebellion: Han Lin'er drowns while crossing the Yangtze
1367	October	Red Turban Rebellion: Zhu Yuanzhang's army under Zhu Liangzi takes Taizhou
1367	1 October	Red Turban Rebellion: Zhu Yuanzhang takes Suzhou and Zhang Shicheng hangs himself; 2,400 large and small cannons are deployed by the Ming army at the siege of Suzhou.
1367	November	Red Turban Rebellion: Zhu Liangzi takes Wenzhou
1367	13 November	Red Turban Rebellion: Zhu Yuanzhang issues orders for Xu Da and Chang Yuchun to head north with 250,000 soldiers and Hu Mei, Tang He, and Liao Yongzhong to attack Fujian and Guangdong
1367	December	Red Turban Rebellion: Fang Guozhen surrenders to Zhu Yuanzhang
1367	28 December	Red Turban Rebellion: Hu Mei's forces take Shaowu
1367	28 December	Red Turban Rebellion: Xu Da and Chang Yuchun conquer Jinan
1367		Zhu Yuanzhang reestablishes the imperial examinations
1368	18 January	Red Turban Rebellion: Hu Mei captures Fuzhou
1368	23 January	Zhu Yuanzhang proclaims himself the Hongwu Emperor of the Ming dynasty (note that Ming and Qing use the era name rather than temple name)
1368	February	Toghon Temür dismisses Köke Temür and orders the remaining Yuan generals to crush him, but they are defeated
1368	17 February	Ming forces conquer Fujian and capture Chen Youding, who is executed
1368	1 March	Ming forces conquer Shandong
1368	16 April	Ming forces capture Kaifeng
1368	18 April	Ming forces reach Guangzhou and receive He Zhen's surrender
1368	25 April	Ming forces defeat Köke Temür and capture Luoyang
1368	26 May	Ming forces capture Wuzhou
1368	July	Ming forces conquer Guangxi
1368	20 September	Ming forces capture Daidu and the Yuan court flees to Inner Mongolia. The remnant Yuan-ruled state in Mongolia is referred to as the Northern Yuan.
1368		Crouching-tiger cannons are employed by the Ming army.

== Gallery ==
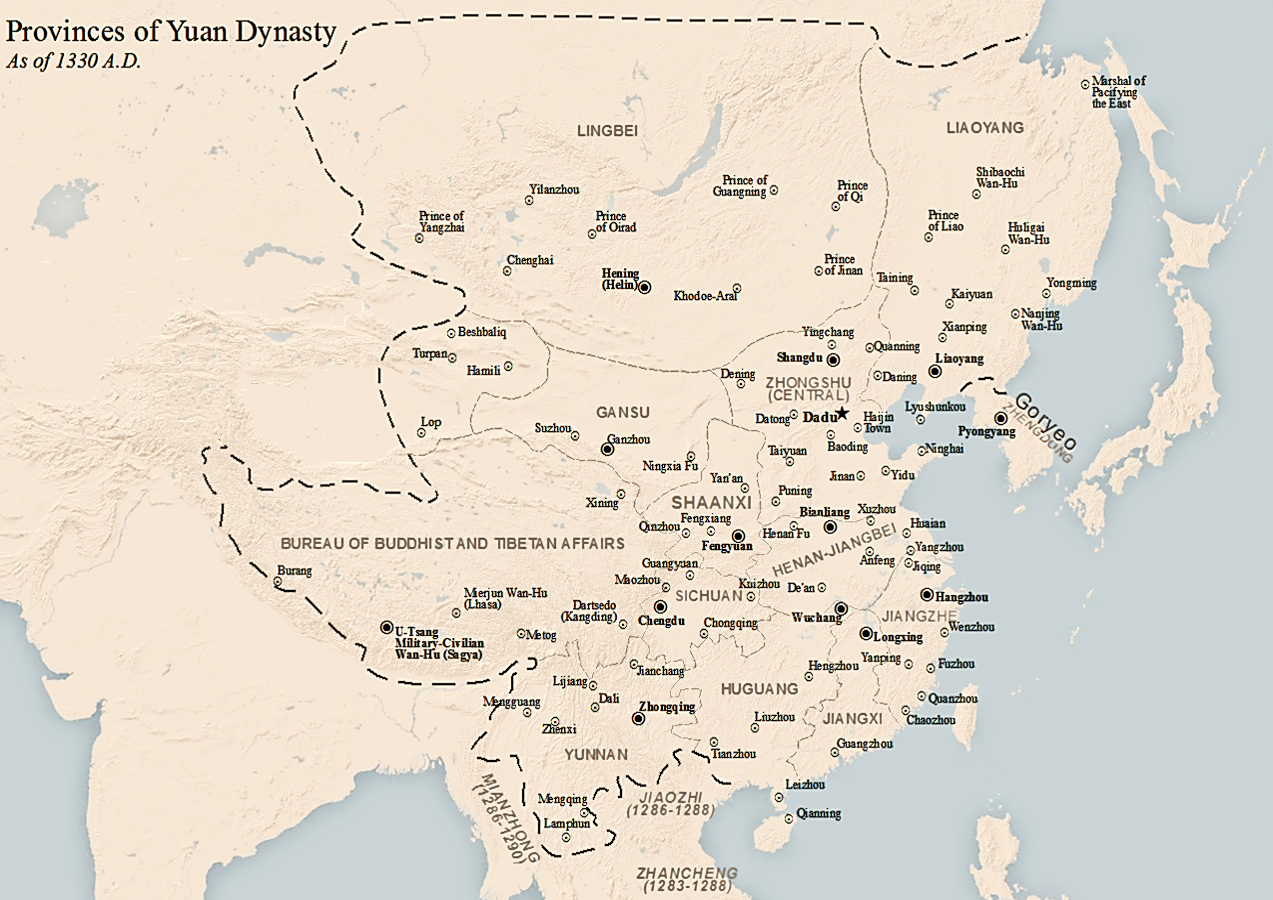
Yuan dynasty

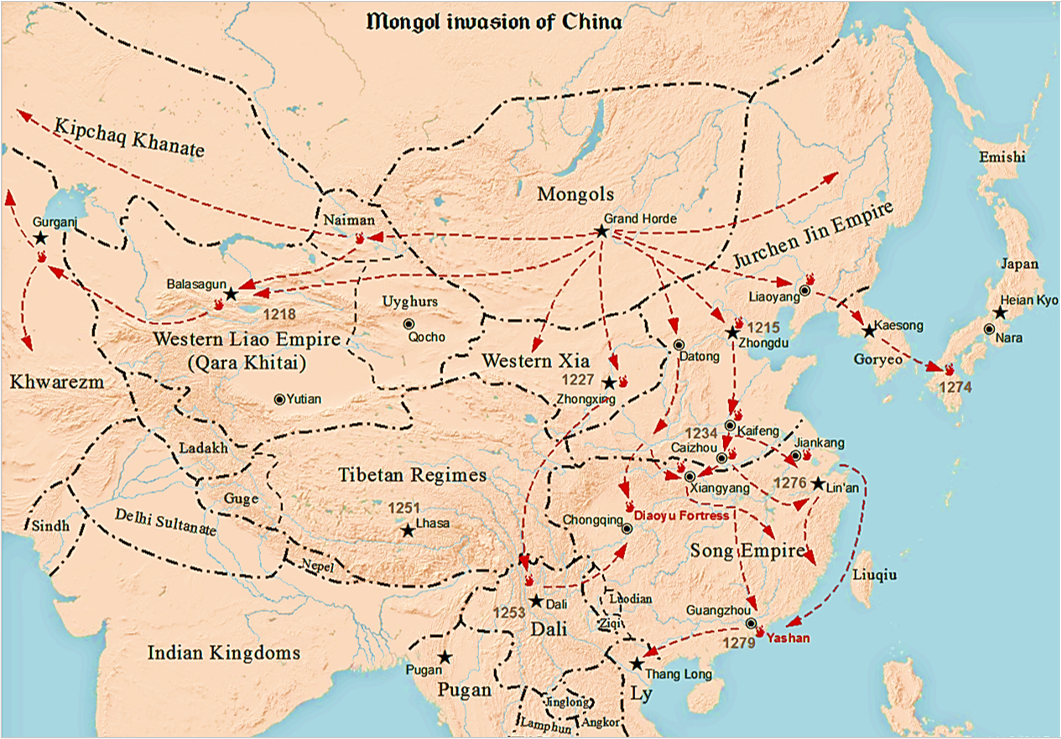
Mongol invasion of China (1205–1279)

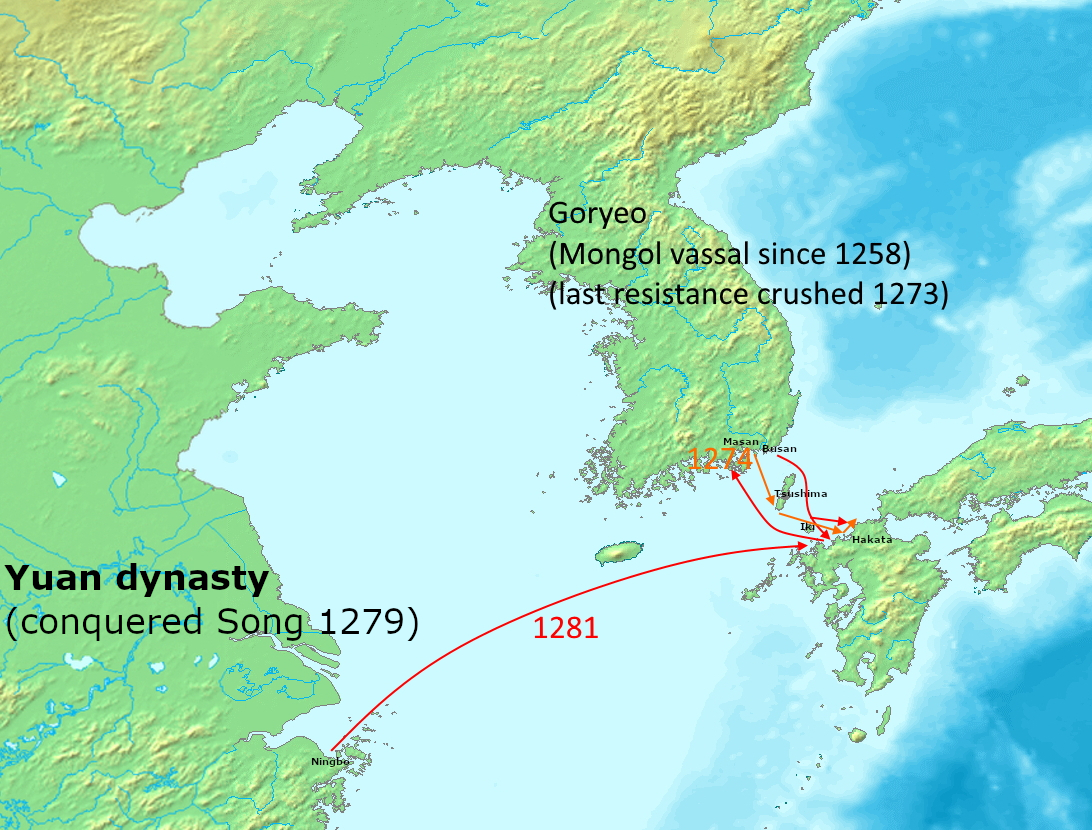
Mongol invasions of Japan

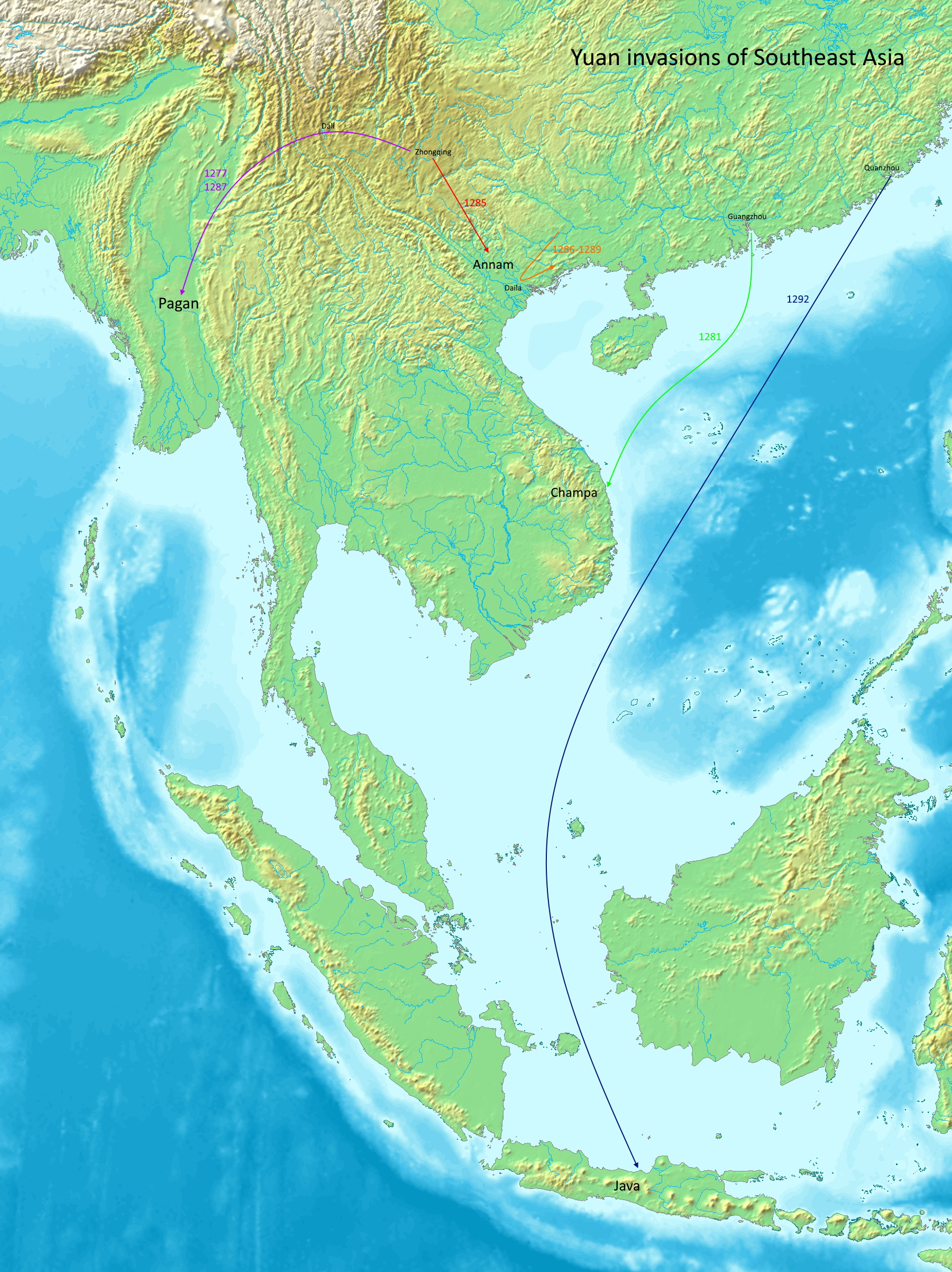
Mongol invasions of Southeast Asia

2nd Mongol invasion of Vietnam (1285)

3rd Mongol invasion of Vietnam (1287–1288)

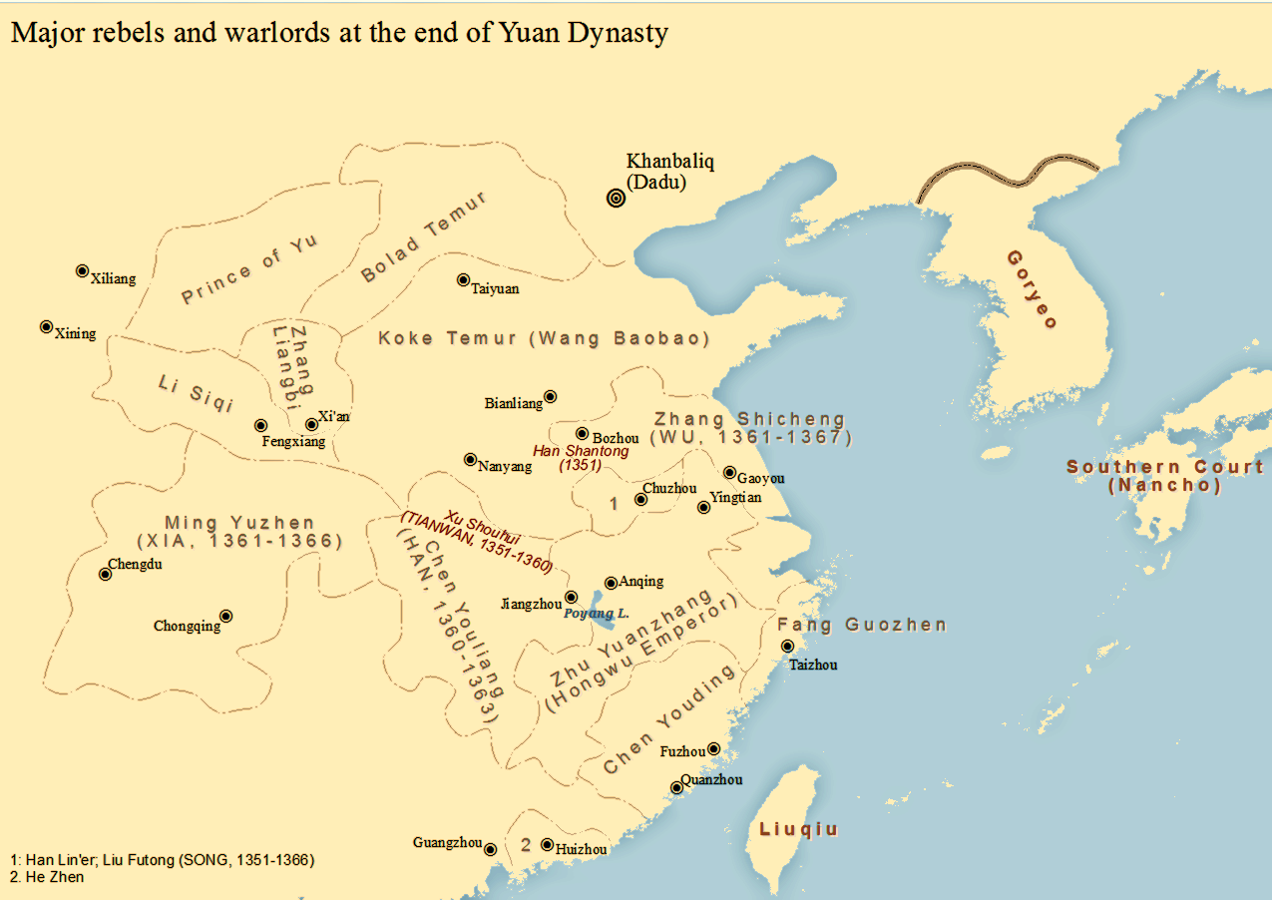
Major rebels and warlords at the end of the Yuan dynasty

== See also ==
- Timeline of the Mongol Empire
- Timeline of the Ilkhanate
- Timeline of the Chagatai Khanate
- Timeline of the Golden Horde
- Timeline of the Northern Yuan
- List of emperors of the Yuan dynasty

== See also ==
- Administrative divisions of the Yuan dynasty

== Bibliography ==
- Andrade, Tonio (2008f), "Chapter 6: The Birth of Co-colonization", How Taiwan Became Chinese: Dutch, Spanish, and Han Colonization in the Seventeenth Century, Columbia University Press
- Andrade, Tonio (2016), The Gunpowder Age: China, Military Innovation, and the Rise of the West in World History, Princeton University Press, ISBN 978-0-691-13597-7.
- Atwood, Christopher P. (2004), Encyclopedia of Mongolia and the Mongol Empire, Facts On File
- Chase, Kenneth (2003), Firearms: A Global History to 1700, Cambridge University Press, ISBN 0-521-82274-2.
- Knapp, Ronald G. (1980), China's Island Frontier: Studies in the Historical Geography of Taiwan, The University of Hawaii
- Jackson, Peter (2005), The Mongols and the West, Pearson Education Limited
- Nakamura, Kazuyuki (2010). "Kita kara no mōko shūrai wo meguru shōmondai" 「北からの蒙古襲来」をめぐる諸問題 [Several questions around "the Mongol attack from the north"]. In Kikuchi, Toshihiko (ed.). Hokutō Ajia no rekishi to bunka 北東アジアの歴史と文化 [A history and cultures of Northeast Asia] (in Japanese). Hokkaido University Press. ISBN 9784832967342.
- Needham, Joseph (1986a), Science and Civilization in China: Volume 3, Mathematics and the Sciences of the Heavens and the Earth, Taipei: Caves Books
- —— (1986g), Science and Civilization in China: Volume 4, Physics and Physical Engineering, Part 1, Physics, Taipei: Caves Books
- —— (1986b), Science and Civilization in China: Volume 4, Physics and Physical Engineering, Part 2, Mechanical Engineering, Taipei: Caves Books
- —— (1986c), Science and Civilization in China: Volume 4, Physics and Physical Technology, Part 3, Civil Engineering and Nautics, Taipei: Caves Books
- —— (1986d), Science and Civilization in China: Volume 5, Chemistry and Chemical Technology, Part 1, Paper and Printing, Taipei: Caves Books
- —— (1986e), Science and Civilization in China: Volume 5, Chemistry and Chemical Technology, Part 4, Spagyrical Discovery and Invention: Apparatus, Theories and Gifts, Taipei: Caves Books
- —— (1986h), Science and Civilization in China: Volume 6, Biology and Biological Technology, Part 1, Botany, Cambridge University Press
- —— (1986f), Science & Civilisation in China, vol. V:7: The Gunpowder Epic, Cambridge University Press, ISBN 0-521-30358-3
- Partington, J. R. (1960), A History of Greek Fire and Gunpowder, Cambridge, UK: W. Heffer & Sons.
- Partington, J. R. (1999), A History of Greek Fire and Gunpowder, Baltimore: Johns Hopkins University Press, ISBN 0-8018-5954-9
- Rubinstein, Murray A. (1999), Taiwan: A New History, East Gate Books
- Trekhsviatskyi, Anatolii (2007). "At the far edge of the Chinese Oikoumene: Mutual relations of the indigenous population of Sakhalin with the Yuan and Ming dynasties". Journal of Asian History. 41 (2): 131–155. ISSN 0021-910X. JSTOR 41933457.
- Lo, Jung-pang (2012). Elleman, Bruce A. (ed.). China as a Sea Power, 1127-1368: A Preliminary Survey of the Maritime Expansion and Naval Exploits of the Chinese People During the Southern Song and Yuan Periods. Singapore: NUS Press. ISBN 9789971695057.
- Twitchett, Denis (1994), The Cambridge History of China, Volume 6, Alien Regime and Border States, 907-1368, Cambridge: Cambridge University Press, ISBN 0521243319
- Twitchett, Denis (1998), The Cambridge History of China Volume 7 The Ming Dynasty, 1368—1644, Part I, Cambridge University Press
- Twitchett, Denis (1998b), The Cambridge History of China Volume 8 The Ming Dynasty, 1368—1644, Part 2, Cambridge University Press
- Twitchett, Denis (2009), The Cambridge History of China Volume 5 The Sung dynasty and its Predecessors, 907-1279, Cambridge University Press
