= Lian Xixian =

Yuan dynasty politician

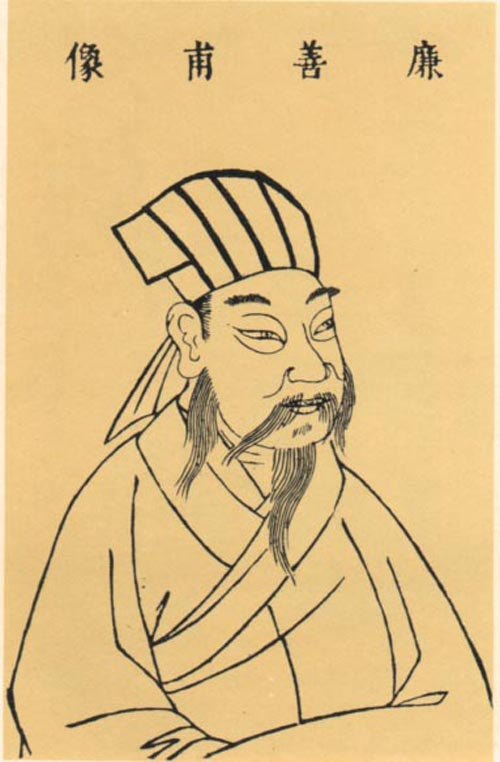
- Born: Hindu; June 26, 1231; Yan'an, Mongol Empire
- Died: December 12, 1280 (aged 49); Shangdu, Yuan dynasty

Lian Xixian (Chinese: 廉希憲; pinyin: Lián Xīxiàn; Wade–Giles: Lien Hsi-hsien, 26 June 1231 — 12 December 1280), born Hindu (Chinese: 忻都) was an Uyghur politician, general and advisor to Kublai Khan, eventually rising to a position of vice-chancellor of Yuan Empire. His courtesy name was Shanfu (Chinese: 善甫) and art name was Yeyun (Chinese: 野雲). An influential Confucian scholar, he was sometimes remembered as Lian Mencius (Chinese: 廉孟子; pinyin: Lián Mèngzǐ) in comparison with Confucian philosopher Mencius.

== Background ==
He was born to an aristocratic Uyghur family as the second son of Buyruq Qaya (1197–1265) in 1231 and a Khitan lady from Shimo (石抹) clan (d. 1264). His grandfather Qitay Qaya (fl. 1200) and great-grandfather Yarp Qaya (fl. 1180) were from Beshbalik and served the Idiqut. Buyruq Qaya was orphaned at an early age and raised by his uncle Alp Qaya. He served and accompanied Barchuq Art Tegin when he submitted to Genghis Khan in 1211. His father was darughachi of Sorghaghtani Beki's appanages in North China and later adopted the surname Lian (Chinese: 廉) after being appointed as Surveillance Commissioner (Chinese: 廉访使; pinyin: Lián fǎng shǐ) in 1231, Yan'an.

== Career ==
=== Under Möngke ===
Growing up, had 12 siblings, including calligrapher Lian Xigong, councillor Lian Xishu and others, all receiving Chinese upbringing. His older brother Lian Ximin was married to a sister of famous sanqu author Sevinch Qaya. At the age of 12, he was recruited to Kublai's keshig and studied under Chinese scholar Wang O (1190–1273) in 1244. During his studies, he adopted worldview of Confucian philosopher Mencius, eventually leading to gain the moniker of Lian Mencius. Around 1250, he married a fellow Uyghur lady - daughter of Mengsuz (1206–1267).

He took part in conquest of Yunnan in 1253. Later he was appointed as head of Kublai's pacification commission in 1254 with its headquarters in Jingzhao. He was aided by famous Chinese officials, including his deputy Shang Ting, agricultural promotion commissioner Yao Shu (Chinese: 姚樞) (1203–1280), superintendent of schools Xu Heng, first secretary Zhao Liangbi (Chinese: 趙良弼) and others. However, in 1257, Kublai was accused that he falsified tax revenues. In reaction, Möngke Khan sent Alamdar (Ariq Böke's close friend and governor in North China) and Liu Taiping, to audit Kublai's officials. They found fault, listed 142 breaches of regulations, accused officials and executed over 20 of them, and thus Lian Xixian's new pacification commission was abolished.

Following the abolition, Xixian returned to Kublai's retinue in Shangdu and was appointed as overseer of Kublai's Chinese appanages. He joined the campaign against Southern Song in 1258, in which he managed to ransom 500 Confucian literati.

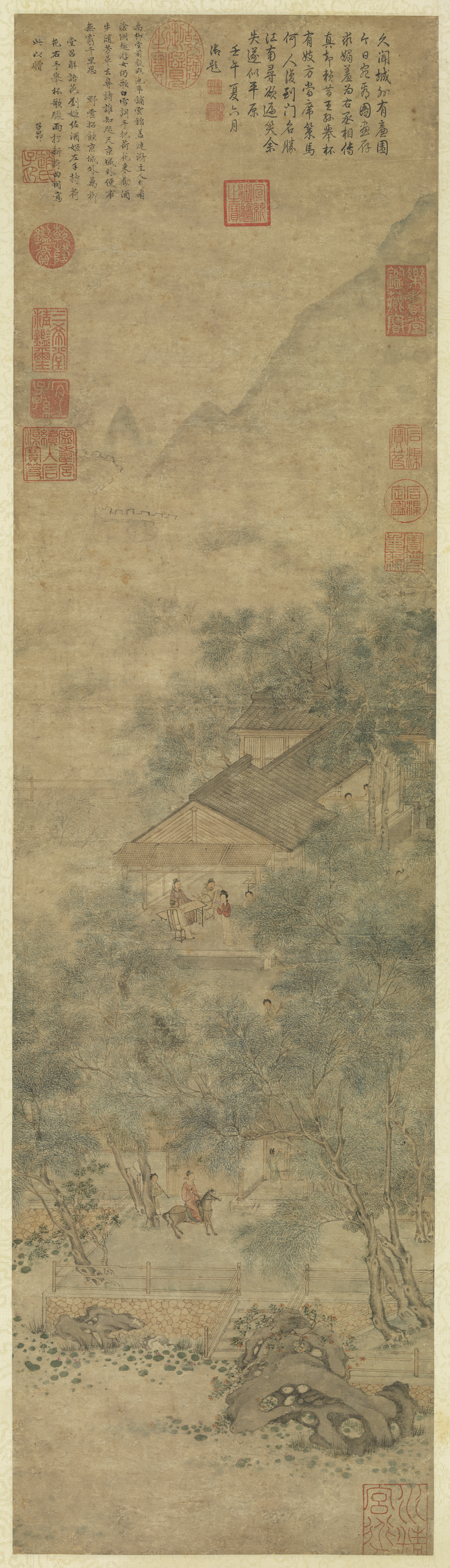
Painting "Scenic View of the Myriad Willow Hall" (万柳堂图) by Zhao Mengfu dedicated to Lian Xixian

=== Under Kublai ===
Following the death of Möngke, his brothers Ariq Böke and Kublai both claimed the throne in 1260, starting Toluid Civil War. Xixian managed to gather support of major Borjigid princes, such as Taghachar, grandson of Temüge to Kublai's side.

Xixian was sent to Shanxi and Sichuan as new pacification commissioner in May 1260. General Qunduqai, former general of Möngke, whose 20,000-strong army were stationed in Mountains of Liupan, Sichuan supported Ariq. Accompanying Kadan, Lian crushed rival forces and killed Qunduqai. He later won another victory against Ariq Böke's ally, Liu Taiping, in northwestern China, seizing food supplies intended for Ariq Böke's army. Lian also drove supporters of Ariq Böke out of the towns of Liangzhou and Ganzhou. In southwestern China, his forces protected Sichuan from Ariq Böke's encroaching troops. Kublai paid Kadan and Lian Xixian handsomely for their military service in gifts and promotions. He rewarded Kadan with 300 packs of silk and 300 taels of silver, and appointed Lian Xixian to the position of Prime Minister of the Right in the Secretariat, also known as director of political affairs of the secretariat (Chinese: 中書平章政事; pinyin: Zhōngshū píngzhāng zhèngshì) in 1263.

Now effectively a vice-chancellor he started to reform governance of Yuan Empire, further centralizing the administration. During his service, he built a palace for himself, known as "Hall of 10,000 Willows" (currently, part of Diaoyutai State Guesthouse), where famous musicians like Jieyuhua (1264–1294) and artists like Xianyu Shu, Lu Zhi and Zhao Mengfu frequented. Zhao later painted "Scenic View of the Myriad Willow Hall", dedicated to Lian Xixian.

He urged for removal of Mongol style appanage system and reestablishment of Chinese conserial system, which came into the force in 1268. He even courageously criticized Kublai. This brought him to a direct conflict with other ministers of the court, especially Ahmad Fanakati, who was against censorial system. He was forced into retirement after Ahmad Fanakati accused him of embezzlement, adultery, and other improprieties in 1270. He spent 1270–1274 in his home, reading, writing and tutoring his children.

He was recalled to service in 1274 due to numerous petitions by Antong, Wang Yun, Wei Chu (魏初) and other Confucian officials. He was appointed as director of political affairs of the regional secretariat of Beijing province. He administered the Liaodong region together with Qurumshi, Muqali's great-grandson and a cousin of Antong. However, several Mongol princes who had appanages in the region resisted his efforts of centralization. Lian even threatened to report Grand Princess of Lu, Nangiajin (daughter of Kublai) to throne over damaging crops during hunting.

Together with Yan Zhongfan, he went to the Song to discuss a surrender. Lian Xixian asked Bayan of Baarin for bodyguards, but Bayan advised that the more bodyguards Lian took with him, the more the likelihood that the Song might harm him. Lian obtained 500 soldiers, but once he arrived at Dusong-guan Pass, the Song general Zhang Ru killed Yan Zhongfan on 12 April 1275. Just a year later he was transferred to Jinghu North Circuit with its capital of Jiangling after its conquest by fellow Uyghur general Ariq Qaya (1226–1286) in 1276.

He was recalled to capital in 1278, with Kublai's hopes to reestablish chancellery system. The plan was dropped because of Ahmad Fanakati's objections. Finally after being sick for years, he died on 12 December 1280 in Shangdu and was buried in the Uyghur quarter Weigongcun, Beijing.

He was posthumously named Wenzheng (文正) and created as Duke of Wei (魏国公) in 1304 by Emperor Chengzong of Yuan.

== Family ==
He was married twice and had at least 12 children:

1. A daughter of Mengsuz (1206–1267)
  - Lian Fu (廉孚) — Deputy Chief of the Regional Secretarial Council of Liaoyang
  - Three daughters
2. A lady from Wanyan clan
  - Lian Ke (廉恪)
  - Lian Chen (廉忱)
  - Lian Xun (廉恂)
  - Lian Heng (廉恆)
  - Lian Dun (廉惇)
  - Three daughters

Chinese artist Lian Quan (1868–1932, 廉泉) who named his studio "Small Cottage of 10,000 Willows" after Xixian's villa was Lian Xixian's descendant.
