= Fang Guozhen =

Yuan dynasty rebel (1319–1374)

Fang Guozhen (simplified Chinese: 方国珍; traditional Chinese: 方國珍; pinyin: Fāng Guózhēn; 1319－1374) was a rebel leader in the late Yuan dynasty of China. He dominated the coast of Zhejiang and surrendered to Zhu Yuanzhang in 1367.

== Life ==
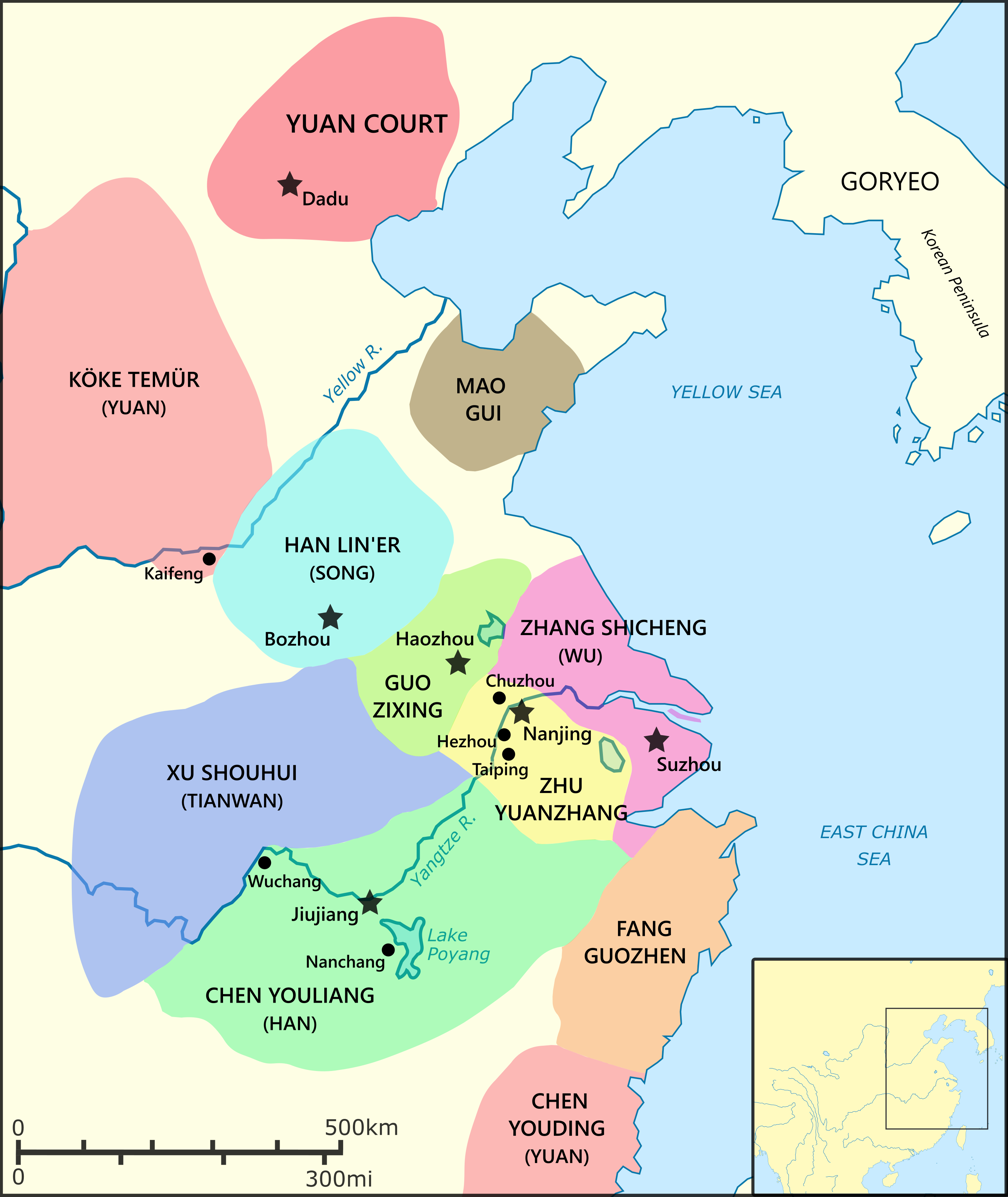
Major powers in China during the late Yuan dynasty, c. 1350–1360, with Fang Guozhen's territory marked in orange

Fang Guozhen was born in Huangyan district in Zhejiang. He was illiterate and his family was probably involved in smuggling and piracy. After killing a man who accused him of piracy, Fang created a pirate band in 1348 that operated off offshore islands. His success disturbed the Yuan government, which relied on grain shipments from the south to the capital, Dadu. Initial Yuan attempts to defeat Fang failed and Berke Bukha's regime only nominally obtained his surrender after promising him multiple official titles, the Yuan government appointed him as the Duke of Qu after 1356. By 1349, Fang Guozhen had not stopped intercepting grain shipments, so Toqto'a tried to repair the Grand Canal to circumvent Fang. The project ultimately succeeded, but many of the workers mobilized for the effort would join the Red Turban Rebellion. By 1356, Fang permanently controlled three coastal prefectures in Zhejiang—Qingyuan, Taizhou, and Wenzhou—that a 1393 census revealed to have a combined population of 2.5 million. These prefectures were governed by Fang's male relatives and, alongside his de facto control over Ningbo and Shaoxing, enhanced his naval supremacy; his fleet was said to be over 1000 ships strong. From 1357 onward, despite prior hostile relations Fang's fleet would help fellow rebel leader Zhang Shicheng transport 110,000 tan of grain to Dadu until Zhang declared independence from the Yuan Dynasty in 1363. After the Battle of Lake Poyang, Fang offered to surrender to the victorious Zhu Yuanzhang (then the Prince of Wu) if they first captured Hangzhou from Zhang Shicheng.

=== Surrender ===
Fang Guozhen initially failed to surrender to Zhu Yuanzhang after the latter captured Hangzhou in December 1366. Zhu launched an amphibious expedition against Fang in late 1367. Zhu Liangzi's army captured Taizhou and Wenzhou from Fang in October and November respectively, while Tang He's fleet drove Fang out of Ningbo, securing his surrender in December shortly before the founding of the Ming Dynasty. The terms of surrender were quite favorable due to Fang's early recognition of Zhu Yuanzhang's legitimacy, his rather passive stance on regional politics, and because Zhu needed Fang’s fleet to conquer the southern Chinese coast; Fang and his family were given offices, military titles, and incomes. He died of natural causes in Nanjing in 1374.

== Relationship with Zhu Yuanzhang ==
Fang Guozhen and Zhu Yuanzhang held frequent diplomatic exchanges. The two often refused gifts from each other such as cities, hostages, and official appointments. In 1361, Fang sent a saddle ornamented with gold and jade to Zhu; he refused the gift, saying: "At present there is trouble everywhere. The times call for able men and there is need of grain and cloth. Such precious playthings are worth-less." Zhu condemned Fang's collaboration with Köke Temür, Chen Youding, and the Yuan Dynasty. Accordingly, his lavish gifts and well-written diplomatic communications did not completely win Zhu's favor; reacting to Fang's evasiveness, Zhu said in 1360 that "We shall leave [Fang Guozhen] alone for the time. After I have conquered [Suzhou], even though he then wants to acknowledge us, it will be too late." Zhu treated Fang well when the latter was taken to Nanjing in 1368.

== Assessment ==
Frederick W. Mote has a positive evaluation of Fang Guozhen. After noting his administrative and diplomatic acumen, Mote writes:

"[Fang Guozhen] thus parlayed his particular assets—his seafaring and organizational skills—into status that transcended his bandit-pirate origins. He became a regional leader and an independent factor in the wars and rivalries out of which the new dynasty [Ming] emerged. While [Zhang Shicheng] squandered his large assets, [Fang Guozhen] may be said to have realized full return on his markedly smaller ones."
