= Shiregi =

Shiregi Ширэги
- Prince of Heping (河平王)

Prince of Heping
- Reign: 1268–c. 1282
- Born: ?
- Died: c. 1282
- House: Borjigin
- Father: Möngke Khan

Shiregi (Mongolian: Ширэги, ᠰᠢᠷᠭᠢ, Chinese: 昔里吉/失列吉; pinyin: Xīlǐjí/Shīlièjí, Persian: شيركى) was a Mongol prince from the Borjigin clan, great-grandson of Genghis Khan.

== Biography ==
Shiregi was born to Möngke Khan and his concubine Bayavchin from Bayaut tribe at unknown time. Initially a supporter of Ariq Böke, he defected to Kublai Khan, for which he was created King of Heping (河平王) in 1267. As soon as Kaidu-Kublai war started he was sent against Kaidu. He arrived together with Nomoghan (son of Kublai), Kököchu (son of Kublai) and Antong (grandson of Muqali) in 1275, Almaliq. However, soon in Autumn 1276 Shiregi was incited by Togh-Temür, another grandson of Tolui to rise against Kublai and claim the empire. Shiregi defeated the princes, sent Nomoghan and Antong to Mengu-Timur of Golden Horde and Kaidu. However, Kaidu refused to join Shiregi in his bid to throne, so they went to Upper Yenisei region to use it as a base to capture Karakorum later. Shiregi actually managed to capture Karakorum in 1277 briefly but was defeated by Bayan of the Baarin. Shiregi later betrayed Togh-Temür after his defeat by Kublai in 1279 and killed him. He was soon captured by Sarban, his nephew who delivered him to Kublai in 1282. Khagan exiled him to "an island with very unhealthy climate" where Shiregi died. His title was given to Sarban while his sons defected to Mengu-Timur. Shiregi had three sons - Ulus Buqa, Töre Temür and Tümen Temür. Töre-Temur married the sister of the Golden Horde Khan Mengu-Timur Khan
