= Liu Bingzhong =

Chinese court adviser (1216–1274)

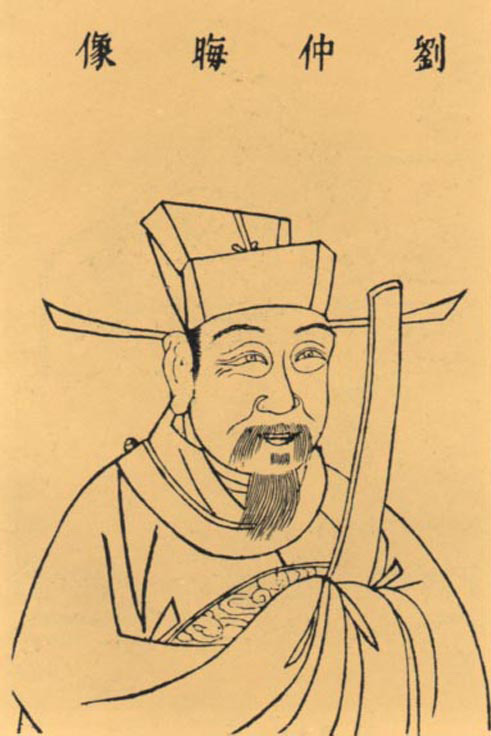
Liu Bingzhong

Liu Bingzhong (Chinese: 劉秉忠; 1216 – 20 September 1274), originally named Liu Kan (Chinese: 劉侃), courtesy name Zhonghui (仲晦), art name Cangchun Sanren (藏春散人), Dharma name Zicong (子聰), posthumous names Duke Wenzhen of Zhao (趙文貞公), Duke Wenzheng of Zhao (趙文正公) and Prince Wenzheng of Changshan (常山文正王), was an official and architect of the Mongol Empire and Yuan dynasty. A trusted advisor of Kublai (Emperor Shizu), Liu Bingzhong served as grand chancellor during Kublai's reign.

== Life and career ==
He was born in Ruizhou (Rui prefecture), during the Jin dynasty. In 1233, he entered the Jin's bureaucracy. He still was an officer after the Mongol Empire conquered the Jin following the Mongol–Jin wars, but later he became a monk. However his teacher thought that his talent should not be buried, so he recommended Liu Bingzhong to Kublai Khan, to become his adviser. During this period, he was extolled as the Five Talented in Xintai. He was credited with occult powers which allowed him to foretell the future and so assist military operations. Liu had a paramount influence on Yuan era city designs, and he is known to have planned both the Yuan capital of Dadu and its summer capital Xanadu (Shangdu).

Liu Bingzhong and Yao Shu made a plan "to canvass all talented to give well-governorship suggestions". Many Confucianists, such as Xu Heng, Wang Xun, Zhang Yi, were attracted to provide ruse to Kublai Khan, who later became the founder of the Yuan Dynasty.

After the Battle of Diaoyu Fortress, Möngke Khan died and Kublai Khan succeeded his post. Liu Bingzhong suggested to name the new dynasty as "Da Yuan" (Chinese: 大元; "Great Yuan") with reference to I Ching, which was adopted by Kublai Khan in 1271. He also suggested Kublai Khan adopt Chinese law over that of Mongol law, and removed some Mongolian misgovernment.

Kublai Khan recognized Jin's Central Capital as the capital of the Yuan, and renamed it to Dadu ("Great Capital"). Liu Bingzhong was the planner and the original architect of the Capital Construction of Dadu. Liu also designed and planned the layout of the Yuan's summer capital at Xanadu (Shangdu). Liu formulated the Time Service Calendar with Guo Shoujing. When he became the teacher of Zhenjin, who later became the Crown Prince (Chinese: 皇太子), he set up the Zishan College in Wuon Mountain to teach Confucianism and Natural Science.

On 20 September 1274, he died in Nanbing Mountain Villa.

== Literary work ==
- Spring Corpus 藏春集 (6 volumes);
- Spring Poetry Anthology 藏春词;
- Poetry Anthology 诗集 (22 volumes);
- Corpus 文集 (10 volumes);
- Pingsha Jade Ruler 平沙玉尺 (4 volumes);
- Jade Ruler and New Mirror 玉尺新镜 (2 volumes).

== See also ==
- History of Beijing
