= Bayan of the Baarin =

Mongol general (1236–1295)

Bayan of the Baarin (Mongolian: Баян; 1236 – January 11, 1295), or Boyan (Chinese: 伯顔; pinyin: Bóyán) was an ethnic Mongol general of the Yuan dynasty of China. He was known to Marco Polo as "Bayan Hundred Eyes" (probably from a confusion with Chinese: 百眼; pinyin: Bǎiyǎn). He commanded the army of Kublai Khan against the Southern Song dynasty, ushering in the Southern Song collapse and the conquest of southern China by the Yuan dynasty.

"Bayan" literally means "rich" in the Mongolian language.

== Background ==
Born a grandnephew of Nayagha, a general under Genghis Khan, Bayan came from the Mongol Baarin tribe. Nayagha, together with Bayan's grandfather Alagh and Alagh's and Nayagha's father Shirgügetü Ebügen, appear in the Secret History of the Mongols.

== Early career ==
His grandfather Alagh was the viceroy in Khorazm province under the Mongol Empire. Bayan's father died during the Mongol siege of the stronghold of the Assassins (Hashshashin). While Bayan served in Persia with Hulegu's army, Kublai Khan recalled him. Kublai liked him, but he did not hold commanding rank in the Yuan army. After the success of the Battle of Xiangyang in 1273, Kublai appointed Bayan as the commander of the Yuan army and general Aju agreed with the decision. Bayan married the niece of Kublai's Khatun Chabi of the Kunggirat. Bayan of the Baarin is wrongly said to have had an Iranian or Persian wife but the biography Xiao wrote on Bayan of Baarin does not mention the ethnicity of the wife and says that she was a wife "in Persia".

== Conquest of southern China ==
The Emperor Duzong of Song died in 1274, and his three-year-old son Zhao Xian (Emperor Gong of Song) succeeded him to the throne (reigned 1274–1276). The Mongols sent Shi Tianze and Bayan on a full-scale campaign against the Song. Shi Tianze died en route. Bayan ordered that Aju head the first column and depart for the Yangtze from Xiangyang, with Lu Wenhuan as fore-runner general; the second column headed by Mang-wu would depart from Yangzhou, with Liu Zheng as forerunner general. Bayan took numerous cities on his march, slaughtered the inhabitants of one town, and killed and captured numerous Song generals. The Song regent and Grand Empress Dowager Xie had no choice but to rely on Jia Sidao for fighting the Mongols. More Song generals surrendered, including Fan Wenhu in Sichuan and Chen Yi in Huangzhou (Huanggang area, Hubei). Hearing that Liu Zheng had died, Jia Sidao experienced a brief ecstasy and led an army of about 130,000 against the Mongols, but he suffered defeat on the Yangtze River. The populace of the Jiangsu areas, around the Yangtze, including Zhenjiang and Jiangyin, deserted their homes in the face of the Mongol attacks. Jia Sidao sent an emissary to Bayan to discuss a truce, but Bayan declined to negotiate. Jia Sidao asked the dowager empress to relocate the Song capital, Hangzhou, but Empress Xie-shi refused to move.

Several ministers at the Song court requested that the regent deprive Jia Sidao of his posts, and the Song released former Mongol emissaries like Hao Jing as a good-will gesture. At this point Zhang Shijie of E'zhou (Hubei Province), Wen Tianxiang of Jiangxi and Li Fei of Hunan came to the east to help the Song court. A Song general abandoned Jiankang (i.e. Nanking), and the Mongols took Changzhou and Wuxi.

Kublai Khan then sent Lian Xixian and Yan Zhongfan to the Song to discuss a ceasefire. Lian Xixian asked Bayan for bodyguards, but Bayan advised that the more bodyguards Lian took with him, the more the likelihood that the Song Chinese might harm him. Lian obtained 500 soldiers, but once he arrived at Dusong-guan Pass, the Song General Zhang Ru killed Yan Zhongfan and captured Lian Xixian. (The History of Yuan Dynasty states that the Song killed Lian too.) Bayan deplored the Song behavior, and sent another emissary, Zhang Xu, to the Song court, together with a Song emissary; but a Song border general had Zhang Xu killed. Then the Mongols stopped peace talks and attacked Yangzhou on the northern bank of the Yangtze (Changjiang River) and defeated two generals under Li Tingzhi. Jiading surrendered next, and a Mongol fire attack defeated Zhang Shijie's navy on the Yangtze. Wen Tianxiang arrived in Lin'an (Hangzhou, the Song capital), but the Empress Dowager did not take his advice. Jia Sidao was expelled from the capital, and the escort official killed him en route. The Mongols took Taizhou in Jiangsu and slaughtered the inhabitants of Changzhou. In Hunan, Li Fei died, and the Song lost both Hunan and Jiangxi Provinces. After taking over Dusong-guan Pass, the Mongols started to close in on the Song capital.

A Song minister called Liu Yue, sent to the Mongol camp to sue for peace, received a rebuff from Bayan, who said that the Song Emperor obtained the throne from a child and would lose it in the hands of a child as well. The Song sent Lu Xufu to the Mongols to express a wish to become a Mongol protectorate, but the Mongols declined the proposal. The Song's new prime minister, Chen Yizhong, sent Liu Yue to the Mongols in an attempt to gain acknowledgment as a Mongol vassal, but a Song Chinese civilian killed Liu Yue en route, at Gaoyou of Jiangsu Province. The Mongols then sacked Jiaxing and An'jie of Zhejiang Province. Wen Tianxiang and Zhang Shijie advised that the Song court relocate to the islands offshore, but Prime Minister Chen Yizhong decided to send the imperial seal to the Mongols in token of surrender. Bayan demanded that Chen personally come to the Mongols, and Chen fled to Wenzhou, a southern Zhejiang coastal city. Zhang Shijie led his people into the sea. The Song appointed Wen Tianxiang as the rightside prime minister and ordered him to go to the Mongols to seek peace. Bayan arrested Wen after he accused Bayan of invasion. In AD 1276, Bayan took over Lin'an and forced the dowager empress to issue the surrender order. He sent the Song royal family, including the dowager empress and Emperor Gongdi, to Peking.

Persian minister Ahmad Fanakati was jealous with Bayan's success and tried to calumniate him that he plundered Chinese commoners.

== Later military career ==
Kublai dispatched his favorite son Nomukhan, another son Kokhcu, Möngke's son Shiregi (Xi-li-jie) and Muqali's grandson An-tong against Kaidu, the grandson of Ögedei Khan to Almaligh in 1275. Following year, Shiregi defected to Kaidu's side and arrested the prince and An-tong due to another relative Tokhtemur's conviction. Then they sent Nomukhan to Mongketemur of Golden Horde and An-tong to Kaidu. Kublai then ordered prime minister Bayan to counter Kaidu, who had started to close in on Karakorum and rebel princes. Bayan defeated Shiregi and his followers. After that Tokhtemur and Shiregi destroyed unity they sought and turned into robber bands. Shiregi killed Tokhtemur. But he was arrested by his former ally Chagatai prince Sarban. He gave Shiregi to Great khan to spare his life. In 1278, the Golden Horde court released Nomukhan and sent him to Yuan dynasty. Rashi ad-Din wrote that Tode Mongke released Nomukhan and expressed his willingness to submit to Kublai after his sons' 10 years hostage in Crimea. But some historians think that Mongketemur released the princes.

Kublai recalled Bayan when Nai-yan (or Nayan, the great-grandson of the brother of Genghis Khan) reportedly planned rebellion in the areas between the Onon and Kerulen rivers of Mongolia. Bayan went to meet and failed to persuade Nai-yan. Bayan fled back to the Mongol capital. A Mongol minister recommended to Kublai that pacifying the khanates in the west would lead Nayan to submit. Kublai therefore ordered this minister to go west: and he claimed that Nai-yan had already submitted to Kublai. Hence the khanates all surrendered to Kublai. After that, Kublai led an army northward against Nai-yan. Seeing that his Mongol soldiers fraternized with the Nai-yan soldiers, Kublai adopted the advice of a Chinese in having the Chinese army act as the forerunner column. General Li Ting tricked Nai-yan into a retreat and then defeated Nai-yan's army of 100,000 in a night attack with cannons. Nai-yan was captured and executed. The battle was later reported by Marco Polo to Europe.

A remnant of Nai-yan's people then fled to Manchuria and attacked eastern Liaoning Province. The Liaodong Xuanweishi (遼東宣慰使) of the Yuan, Ta-chu (塔出), asked for aid, and Kublai sent his son over. Ta-chu defeated the Nai-yan remnants under Khadan (Descendant of Genghis Khan's another brother) and chased them westward to the Altai. Ta-chu won the title of wan hu. Nai-yan remnants, however, still remained for some time.

Bayan received orders to counter Kaidu, who harassed Helin in the west; and Prince Temür (grandson of Kublai) had the duty of guarding the Liao River area in the east. When a Mongol official defected to Kaidu and attacked Kublai's grandson Kamala (or Gemala) near Hang'aishan Mountain, Kublai would lead a column to the north. Kaidu retreated thereafter. Bayan would continue warfare with Kaidu for some time before he left the post at Helin. Unfortunately, some ministers accused him of Kaidu's desertion. He was sent to China far away from Mongolia for a while. Temür was appointed a governor in Karakorum and Bayan became a minister.

== Later life ==
Bayan met and swore loyalty to Kublai Khan before the latter's death in 1294. When the Yuan court went through a power vacuum for a few months, minister Bayan sided with Kublai's daughter-in-law Kökejin to establish Kublai's grandson Temür as Kublai's successor, the Emperor Chengzong. Bayan died on 11 January 1295.

== Popular culture ==
Bayan was a major character in the novel The Black Rose written by Thomas B. Costain. In the film adaptation he was played with a mixture of culture and menace by Orson Welles.

"Hundred Eyes" is portrayed by Tom Wu in the Netflix series Marco Polo. However, he is depicted as a blind Taoist monk from Wudang Mountains whose name is Li Jinbao.
