= Guo Zixing =

Late Yuan dynasty warlord (d. 1355)

Guo Zixing (Traditional Chinese: 郭子興; simplified Chinese: 郭子兴; pinyin: Guō Zǐxīng; d. 1355) was a rebel leader in the late Yuan dynasty of China. He was the father-in-law of Zhu Yuanzhang, the future founder of the Ming dynasty. In 1370, Zhu granted Guo the noble title Prince of Chuyang (滁陽王) posthumously.

== Life ==
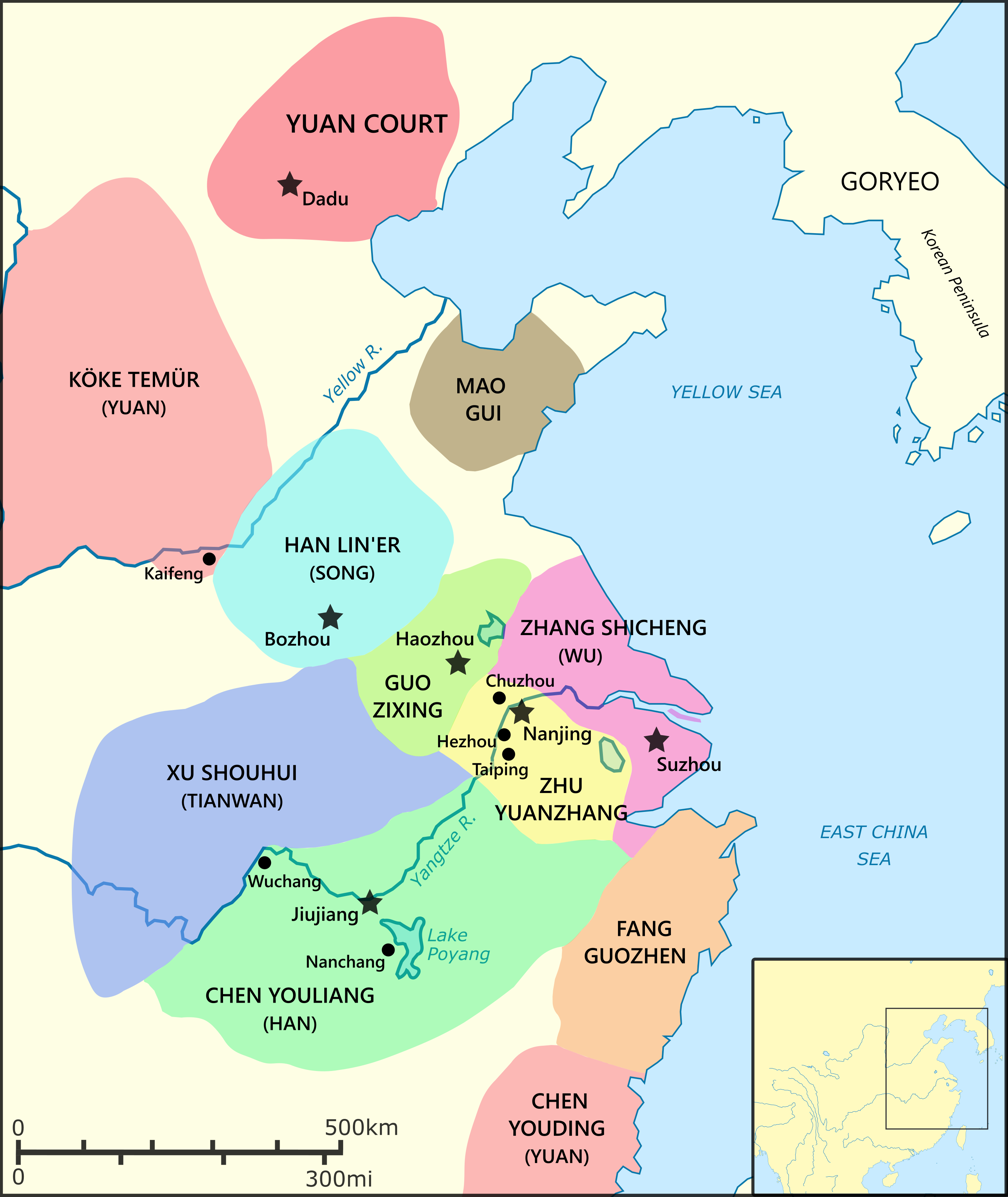
Major powers in China during the late Yuan dynasty, c. 1350–1360, with Guo Zixing's territory marked in light green

Guo Zixing originally came from Dingyuan. His father was a fortune teller and his mother was the daughter of a wealthy man. Guo was a good fighter but had a rash temper. As the leader of a local White Lotus society and a follower of the Maitreya Buddha, Guo believed that a time of great change was ahead so he used his money to gather a group of loyal soldiers. He and four friends – one of which was Sun Deya (孫德崖) and all of whom were made commanders-in-chief – led their followers to capture Haozhou in February 1352. Guo Zixing's role as leader was shaky from the start and he struggled to control his underlings. The Yuan dynasty's response to the capture of Haozhou was initially lackluster, consisting of undisciplined village raiding and temple burning. The temple where Zhu Yuanzhang resided was burned in February 1352. He went to Haozhou in April and joined Guo Zixing's command. Zhu quickly became a favorite of Guo Zixing and Guo's younger wife convinced him to wed his adopted daughter (the future Empress Ma) to Zhu, who was attracted to her dexterity and mental clarity. He developed a close relationship with Guo's younger wife, eventually taking her daughter as a concubine. Guo then entrusted Zhu with Chuzhou and Hezhou.

Yuan forces under Toqto'a drove Sesame Seed Li (芝麻李) from Xuzhou in late 1352 and two of his generals, Peng Da (彭大) and Zhao Junyong (趙均用), took refuge in Haozhou in early 1353. This strained the city's small resources and factions soon developed. Guo Zixing sided with Peng Da and was kidnapped by the opposing faction led by Sun Deya and Zhao Junyong. Zhu Yuanzhang, returning from an expedition, rescued him after bringing Guo's younger wife, her children, and Peng Da to the opposing faction's camp and raiding Sun's house. Yuan forces under hydraulic engineer Jia Lu (賈魯) besieged Haozhou in winter 1352 and ended in June 1353 after he died. Zhao Junyong became the strongest leader in Haozhou after Peng Da's death, causing Guo and Zhu to fall out of favor. In autumn 1353, Guo Zixing gave an independent commission to Zhu Yuanzhang, beginning the latter's rise to power. Meanwhile, Zhao and Guo sieged Xuyi, hoping to capture Xuzhou afterward. Zhao sent Zhu south towards the Yangtze River in the hopes that he would fail; Zhu instead captured Dingyuan, Lupai Fort (驢牌寨), and Chuzhou and ambushed Yuan general Zhang Zhiyuan (張知院). These successes swole his forces to 20,000 men. Guo Zixing and his 10,000 men then left Zhao Junyong and joined Zhu.

Tensions developed between Zhu Yuanzhang and Guo Zixing. Both agreed to take Hezhou, with Guo sending his troops first and Zhu's general Tang He capturing the city later. Zhu also humiliated Guo's generals, one of whom was Guo's brother-in-law Zhang Tianyou (張天祐). After a failed Yuan counter siege, Zhu allowed Guo's old enemy, Sun Deya, to join their forces. This furthered Guo's resentment towards Zhu.

== Death and aftermath ==
Guo Zixing died in Heyang in May 1355. His elder son, Guo Tianxu (郭天敍), and his brother-in-law, Zhang Tianyou, considered themselves Guo's successors and were confirmed by Han Lin'er, the nominal emperor of the Northern Red Turbans. Zhu Yuanzhang initially did not accept this, saying "Ought the man with the big stick to be able to accept the authority of others?" He later decided to take advantage of Han's legitimacy and employed these two relatives of Guo. Both were killed while participating in Zhu's October 1355 attack on Nanjing. Guo Zixing's younger son was made Zhu's second-in-command in April 1356 but was executed after plotting a rebellion. These developments consolidated Zhu's role as de facto leader of the Northern Red Turbans.

The Kangxi Emperor of the Qing dynasty was concerned when he heard that the History of Ming contained slander against Zhu Yuanzhang; there was a particular anxiety towards Zhu's association with the White Lotus society. In response, Zhang Tingyu, the compiler of the History of Ming, justified his decision to pair Guo Zixing's (Zhu's father-in-law's) biography with that of Han Lin'er by pointing out that Zhu swore nominal allegiance to Han until 1367.
