= Sewinch Qaya =

- Born: 1286; Yongzhou
- Died: May 30, 1324 (aged 37–38); Hangzhou
- Writing career
- Pen name: Chengzhai; Suanzhai
- Genre: Sanqu

Sewinch Qaya (Chinese: 小云海涯; pinyin: Xiǎoyún Hǎiyá; 1286—30 May 1324) or Guàn Yúnshí (Chinese: 贯云石; Wade–Giles: Kuan Yün-Shih), art name Chengzhai (Chinese: 成齋), later Suanzhai (Chinese: 酸齋; pinyin: Suānzhāi) was an Uyghur scholar, songwriter and a famous sanqu and shi author who lived in the Mongol Empire.

== Background ==
He was born in 1286 in Yongzhou to Guan Zhige (贯只哥) who was an ethnic Uyghur official and a son of general Ariq Qaya (1226-1286) who brought his family from Beshbalik to newly conquered Chinese provinces of Mongol Empire. Sewinch followed his father to adopt surname Guan. According to one information, his sister was married to Lian Ximin, elder brother of Lian Xixian. However, according to another information, his mother was Lian Ximin's daughter.

== Career ==
During his teen years he was distinguished by his mastery of martial arts and physical prowess. He left home at the age of 17 to serve in government. About 3 years, he served as darughachi of Jiangxi. He was appointed as garrison commander of Yongzhou in 1306, following his father's depart for chief administratorship of Huguang province. He held this post for 2 years until his resignation in February 1308. He was succeeded by his brother Quduq Qaya in this post. Sewinch himself left for Khanbaliq.

He became a disciple of Yao Sui following his arrival in Yuan capital. Sewinch prepared his first vernacular exegesis of Classic of Filial Piety under his tutelage in 1308. Following recommendation of Yao, Guan became a tutor to Shidibala, heir of Ayurbarwada until 1313. He married around this time and adopted his father's surname Guan as well. In February–March 1313 he was appointed as a member of Hanlin Academy with the rank reader-in-waiting (Chinese: 侍讀學士; pinyin: shìdú xuéshì). While working here, he participated in discussions about whether the court should adopt the Mongol system of hereditary appointments or the Chinese method of impartial exams to select officials. His tenure in academy also brought him to contact and acquaintance of scholars like Zhao Mengfu, Yu Ji (虞集), Ouyang Xuan (欧阳玄), Cheng Jufu (程鉅夫), Deng Wenyuan (邓文原) and others. However, Guan resigned on 24 March 1317 unexpectedly and was succeeded by a Mongol academician - Öljei Buqa.

== Later life ==
He tried to focus on poetry, Chan Buddhism and Taoism following resignation from his post, meeting master Zhongfeng Mingben. He spent some time traveling South China, for example, he visited Mount Putuo during summer of 1317 before settling in Hangzhou for the rest of his retirement in 1318. He lost contact with most of his friends at the time, lived in seclusion and kept correspondence only with poet Zhang Kejiu (张可久) who visited his villa here. He worked as medicine trader for the rest of his life. He died on 30 May 1324 and was given posthumous name Wenjing (文靖) and ennobled Duke of Jingzhao (京兆公).

== Family ==
He was married to a daughter of Shi Tianlin (1218-1309). They had two sons called Arslan Qaya (b. c. 1310) and Bars Qaya, as well as a daughter who was married to Duan Qian, garrison commander of Huaiqing. Additionally, he had two concubines named Donghua and Youcao towards the end of his life.

== Legacy and works ==
Sewinch Qaya remains an influential figure in sanqu poetry, his songs still played as part of kunqus. While his contemporaries like Yao Sui and Deng Wenyuan praised his works and character, Zhu Quan, relegated him to second tier poet. Known works include:

=== Books ===
- Vernacular exegesis of Classic of Filial Piety (1308)

=== Songs ===
- Song on a Painting a Dragon (1309-1313)
- Palace Song (1313)
- Songs, newly edited in the spirit of cloud-stopping melodies of old (Chinese: 乐府新编阳春白雪; pinyin: Yuèfǔ xīnbiān Yángchūn báixuě), c. 1324 with Yang Zhaoying (楊朝英)
- The new sounds of the songs of great peace gathered from all over the land (Chinese: 朝野新声太平乐府; pinyin: Cháoyě Xīnshēng Tàipíng Yuèfǔ), preface dated 1351 with Yang Zhaoying
- Song of Princess Mountain (1317)
- Song of Pick Rocks Mountain (1317)
- Music for Tatar Pipe, made for Ali Xiying (1317)

=== Calligraphy ===
- Middle Boat (Chinese: 中舟; pinyin: Zhōng zhōu)
- Postscript to Cicadas and Crows in Winter (Chinese: 跋宋人寒蝉鸦卷; pinyin: Bá sòng rén hánchán yā juǎn)

=== Poetry ===
- Peach Blossom Cliff (1313)
- The Fair One (1313-1317)
- On Viewing the Sunrise (1317)
- The Grief of Parting (1317)
- Reed-Floss Quilt (1318-1323)
- Feelings Aroused by the Autumn River (1317)
- Triune Retreat (1318-1323)
- Longing for My Mother (1313)
- The Hall of the Great Peace on Mount Lu (1317/8)
- Yueyang Tower (1317)
- Tiger Run Spring (1318-1324)
- Farewell to the World (1324)

== Sources ==
- Lynn, Richard John (1980). Kuan Yün-Shih. Twayne's world authors series. Boston: Twayne Publishers. ISBN 978-0-8057-6404-8.
