= Zhang Shide =

Yuan-era general (d. 1357)

Zhang Shide (simplified Chinese: 张士德; traditional Chinese: 張士德; pinyin: zhāng shìdé; d. 1357) was a younger brother and general of Zhang Shicheng during the late Yuan dynasty. His conquests significantly increased his brother’s power and his death led to complacency in Zhang Shicheng’s court.

== Life ==
Zhang Shide and his brothers (one of whom was Zhang Shicheng) were boatmen for the Yuan government salt monopoly. Disgruntled at excessive duties and cheated by customers who bought the brothers’ smuggled salt, the Zhang brothers (along with 14 other salt workers) organized a self-defense group around Zhang Shicheng. In 1353, the chaos they caused by burning the houses of influential people pressured them into rebellion. Shicheng’s rebellion would spread quickly until it was nearly destroyed by Yuan general Toqto’a in Gaoyou. In late 1355, Zhang Shicheng sent Zhang Shide to cross the Yangtze River in order to plan an expedition. Shide captured Changshu in February 1356 and captured Suzhou in March. In April, Shicheng made Suzhou his capital; he would remain there until his death. Zhang Shicheng continued to capture territory both east of Changzhou and into northern Zhejiang. However, he was forced to withdraw from Hangzhou after entering the city in summer 1356. These conquests strengthened Zhang Shicheng’s regime but also brought him into conflict with Zhu Yuanzhang, the future founder of the Ming Dynasty.

== Death and aftermath ==
Zhang Shide was captured by Zhu Yuanzhang while fighting over Fushan harbor in summer 1357. Zhu tried to use him as a bargaining chip to obtain favorable terms with Zhang Shicheng, but Shide sent his brother a letter telling him not to yield and, if necessary, to instead surrender to the Yuan Dynasty. Zhang Shide then starved himself to death while in captivity.

Zhang Shide’s death ended the expansionist phase of Shicheng’s regime. From then on, Shicheng took a passive stance to governance, evidenced by his surrender to the Yuan Dynasty in late 1357. In exchange for immunity from Yuan attacks, Zhang Shicheng shipped up to 150,000 pickups of rice to the Yuan capital, Dadu, every year. Without Shide’s aggressive generalship, Shicheng’s armies became less disciplined and his government became less legalistic. The government went on to be dominated by Zhang Shicheng’s youngest brother, the generalissimo Zhang Shixin, and his son-in-law, Pan Yuanshao, both of whom had decadent tendencies. These developments contributed to the ultimate defeat of Zhang Shicheng by Zhu Yuanzhang. Alongside Zhang Shixing, the generals Li Bosheng, Lü Zhen, and Xu Yi would continue to serve under Zhang Shicheng despite their king’s newfound passivity.
