= Nayan (Mongol prince) =

Mongol prince, rebelled against Kublai Khan

- Prince of Kwang-ning
- Born: c. 1257
- Died: July 1287
- House: Borjigin
- Father: Ajul?
- Religion: Nestorianism

Nayan (Chinese: 乃顏; pinyin: Nǎiyán) was a prince of the Yuan dynasty. A member of the imperial Borjigin clan, he was a descendant of a brother of Genghis Khan, probably Temüge. He raised a noteworthy and serious rebellion against Kublai Khan and was subsequently executed for the rebellion. He was a Nestorian Christian. Much of what is known of Nayan was recorded by the Venetian traveller Marco Polo.

== Origins ==
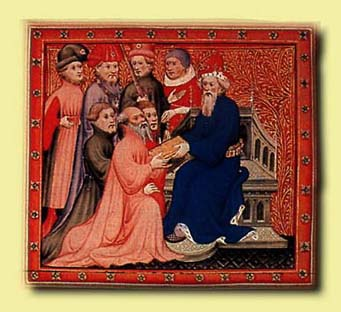
Marco Polo and Kublai Khan, an illustration in an Italian book from the 14th century

Nayan was a member of a collateral branch of the Mongol royal dynasty, being a descendant of one of the brothers of Genghis Khan. He was either a great-great grandson of Temüge, Genghis Khan's youngest full brother, or of Belgutai, his half-brother. More than one prince named Nayan existed and their identity has been confused; the historian Paul Pelliot was of the opinion that the Christian prince Nayan was not a descendant of Belgutai. He ascertains Nayan's father to be Ajul, son of Tacar, son of Jibügan, son of Temüge. The close male relatives of Genghis Khan were given control of large appanage domains located in Mongolia and neighbouring lands such as Manchuria. Marco Polo describes Nayan as ruling four great provinces: 'Ciorcia' (possibly meaning Jurchen), 'Cauli' (Korea, probably only a part of Northern Korea), 'Barscol' and 'Sichintingiu'. Located in his domains was a town called Kwang-ning, and because of this Nayan was termed 'Prince of Kwang-ning'. In addition, Nayan was also the foremost leader of the Eastern uluses (tribal groupings and districts ruled by Mongol appanage princes) dominated by the descendants of the brothers of Genghis Khan. Whatever the precise extent of Nayan's appanage, he certainly held sufficient lands within and around Manchuria to give him a power-base from which to launch a rebellion against his kinsman Kublai Khan.

== Rebellion ==
Nayan is represented as embodying a traditional Mongol reaction against the increasing Sinicisation shown by Kublai Khan and his administration. Nayan adhered to the ancestral nomadic values of the Mongols and was dismayed at Kublai's estrangement from these ideals. More prosaically Kublai Khan was, possibly based on the models of Chinese principles of governance, consolidating power in his own hands and the semi-independent appanage princes were beginning to feel threatened. Nayan allied with two other descendants of the brothers of Genghis Khan, Shiktur and Qada'an, who also held appanages in Eastern Mongolia and Manchuria. He was also in contact with Kublai Khan's close kinsman and inveterate enemy Kaidu, who ruled much of Central Asia. Kaidu is often referred to as Kublai's nephew, but was in reality his first cousin, once removed.

Nayan broke into open rebellion between 14 May and 12 June, 1287, and the main battle against Kublai took place around 16 July.

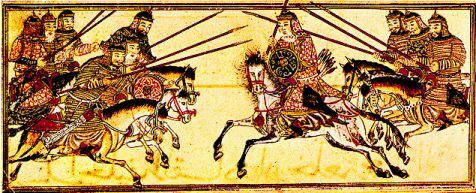
Mongol heavy cavalry - Mongols fighting Mongols in battle

Kublai Khan had suspicions, and justifiable fears, of co-operation between Nayan and Kaidu, and sent his leading general Bayan to investigate. One contemporary source relates that Nayan invited Bayan to a feast, but forewarned of a trap, Bayan escaped. Whatever the truth of this incident, Bayan was sent with an army to occupy Karakorum in order to block Kaidu from moving eastward and joining Nayan. Kublai himself, despite his advanced age of 72 years, raised another army and rapidly moved against Nayan in Manchuria. The speed and scale of Kublai's response meant that the various rebels were given very limited opportunities to co-ordinate their movements and concentrate their forces, and left them open to being defeated individually. The imperial fleet moved great quantities of supplies to the mouth of the Liao River to support the campaign. Nayan was himself encamped on the banks of the same river further inland. Kublai directed his forces from a palanquin mounted on, or drawn by, four elephants.

Moving at a rapid pace, and carefully screening his army, Kublai Khan's forces surprised Nayan at his encampment. The camp of Nayan was protected by a wagon laager, a field fortification commonly employed by steppe nomads. The khagan's army was organised in three divisions: first the Mongols, second the Chinese, and third the Guard and Kipchaks, the latter combined under Kublai's direct command. Nayan's army was less disciplined than that of Kublai's, and it is alleged that it was momentarily panicked before the battle began by the discharge, by some of the khagan's troops, of an early variety of explosive device. According to Marco Polo, as a Christian, Nayan's standard bore the insignia of the cross. The armies faced each other with their great kettle drums beating and horns sounding. The battle began with exchanges of arrows but then developed into close combat with lance, sword and iron mace. The battle was hard-fought and lasted from early morning until mid-day, when Nayan's army began to break up. Nayan's soldiers started to flee the field, many were cut down, and Nayan himself was captured.

== Aftermath of the rebellion ==
Kublai ordered Nayan to be executed immediately and in secret, in order that no petitions for mercy might arise. Nayan was executed in a manner that avoided the spilling of his royal blood; he was rolled in a carpet and smothered or thrown up and down until dead. Though he was unable to effectively support Nayan's rebellion, Kaidu remained a potent threat for the remainder of Kublai Khan's life. Kublai chose not to regard Nayan's Nestorian Christian co-religionists as guilty by association, and refused to allow them to suffer any level of persecution within his lands.

In the wake of the suppression of Nayan's rebellion, Kublai Khan was able to begin to fully incorporate the lands and peoples previously dominated by the appanage princes into his domain.

== Bibliography ==
- Cordier, Henri (1920). Ser Marco Polo: Notes and Addenda to Sir Henry Yule's Edition, Containing the Results of Recent Research and Discovery. London: John Murray. OCLC 1337277.
- Grousset, René (1970). The Empire of the Steppes: A History of Central Asia. Translated by Walford, Naomi. New Brunswick: Rutgers University Press. ISBN 9780813513041.
- Jackson, Peter (4 August 2021). "From Ulus to Khanate: The making of the Mongol states c. 1220 - c. 1290". In Amitai, Reuven (ed.). The Mongol Empire and Its Legacy. Leiden: Brill. ISBN 9789004492738.
- Man, John (31 March 2012). Kublai Khan: The Mongol King Who Remade China. London: Bantam Press. ISBN 9781446486153.
- Pelliot, Paul (1963). Notes on Marco Polo. OCLC 642974811.
- Rossabi, Morris (2 November 2009). Khubilai Khan: His Life and Times. Berkeley: University of California Press. ISBN 9780520261327.
