= Tang He =

Ming dynasty general (1326–1395)

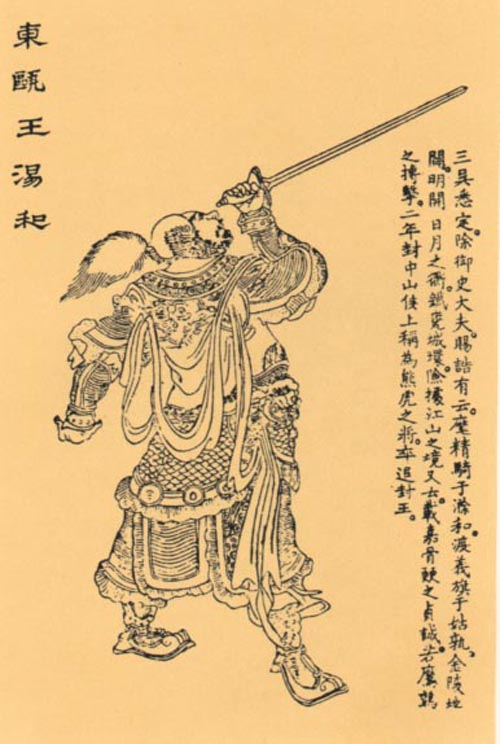
Tang He

Tang He (Chinese: 湯和; 1326–1395), courtesy name Dingchen, was a significant character in the rebellion that ended the Yuan dynasty and was one of the founding generals of Ming dynasty. He came from the same village as Zhu Yuanzhang and joined Guo Zixing's Red Turban Rebellion, a millenarian sect related to the White Lotus Society, at the time of its original uprising, in March 1352. Tang was promoted quickly in rank as Guo's army grew. After conquering Jiqing (present-day Nanjing) City and Zhenjiang City, which was under the command of Zhu Yuanzhang, he was promoted to Yuan Shuai (wing commander), and after conquering Changzhou in April 1357, Tang was placed in command there with the rank of deputy assistant chief of the commission of military affairs. In 1367, he was sent south to defeat Fang Guozhen's and Chen Youding's forces, and then campaigned in Shanxi, Gansu, and Ningxia under the command of Xu Da. He was granted the title Duke Xingguo. Tang He died in August 1395, one of the few founding generals of the Ming dynasty who had a natural death.

== Early life ==
Tang was born into a desperately poor farming family in Zhongli Village, which is in present-day Fengyang, Anhui Province. He and Zhu Yuangzhang were friends in childhood, and Tang later became one of the closest associates and the principal general of Zhu. Tang had shown his ambition and talent as a militarist since childhood. He would like to be a leader amount partners, and preferred practicing riding and arching at very young age. After growing up, Tang became a calm, strong, confident, and well-spoken man that could be an outstanding militarist.

== Military career ==
=== Early career ===
In 1352, because of the natural disaster and the Yuan dynasty's incompetent governing, a rebellious group named the Red Turbans rose. It signaled the beginning of the end of Mongol rule over China. Tang joined the rebellion with several other ambitious young men, and invited Zhu Yuanzhang, who became a novice monk at the Huangjue Temple, to the Red Turbans. Zhu accepted this invitation; after that, he was soon granted a position higher than Tang for his contributions. Early in 1354, Tang was selected by Zhu Yuanzhang, then Guo's protege, to be one of twenty-four men to serve as the core of his personal command.

After Zhu's capture of Chuzhou in April, he received the rank of battalion commander. Tang served under Zhu in the invasion of Dahongshan in year 1353, and they conquered Chuzhou and Hezhou together. Tang was the only one who strongly supported Zhu when Zhu's authority was contested by the other generals at Hezhou in 1355.

Later in the same year, Tang together with other generals conquered Lishui and Jurong under the command of Zhu. In the storming of Taiping, against Cheng Yexian, Tang was wounded by an arrow on the left leg. Though he was seriously injured, Tang persisted in the battle and finally caught Cheng alive. In year 1356, serving under Xu Da, Tang took part in the conquering of Jiqing (present-day Nanjing), which became the base of Zhu's operation and the capital of the Ming dynasty. Soon after, Tang and Xu Da conquered Zhenjiang and Changzhou. Following these successes, Tang was promoted to Yuan Shuai(wing commander), and he was placed in Changzhou with the rank of deputy assistant chief of Shumiyuan (Commission of Military Affairs).

=== Defense of Changzhou ===
Changzhou was the most important of several cities controlled by Zhu Yuanzhang, which constituted the line of defense against the kingdom of Zhang Shicheng, who declared himself as King of Wu and was Zhu's enemy. Tang He and his large garrison had to defend the city and act as a mobile reserve to help other cities when they were threatened. Zhang sent spies rapidly to get information, but their all failed, attributing to Tang's effective commands. Zhang also invaded the city several times, while Tang beat off one attack in February 1358, and in May 1359, Tang captured over one thousand men and forty ships by an ambush. Tang did not participate in the battle against Chen Youliang, because he was ordered to act occasional counterattacks against Zhang Shicheng's territories. In February 1363, he was promoted to junior administrator of the secretariat; then, in April 1364, becoming chief administrator.

=== War against Zhang Shicheng ===
Finally, Zhu's main army returned to Nanjing after defeating Chen, and Tang's troops were permitted to go to other areas. Tang was soon granted the title of left censoring-chief for defeating Zhang's army utterly in the invasion of Wuxi, and was granted as "Pin Zhang Zhen Shi"(a prestigious title) after victory over Zhang's navy in the area of Huangyang Mountain. Later in December 1364, Tang relieved Changxing from Zhang Shixin's (Zhang Shicheng's brother) siege, and captured eight thousand soldiers alive in the hard-fought battle. In October 1365, Tang joined the final battle against Zhang Shicheng under the command of Xu Da. Tang quickly destroyed Zhang's navy in Lake Tai and Wujiang, and rejoined the main army that besieged Suzhou. In the fight in Chang Men (part of Suzhou), Tang was once more wounded. He returned to Nanjing to convalesce, but was back soon for the invasion of Suzhou in October, 1367. Tang was granted a great reward by Zhu after the battle, and was given the nominal title of instructor to the heir apparent in February of the following year.

=== Conquest of Fujian ===
In 1365, Zhu declared himself as King of Wu. After the collapse of their last great enemy, Zhang, Tang was put in charge of the southern expedition with Wu Zhen as his deputy, and ordered to lead the former garrisons of Jiangzhou, Jiangxing, and Jiangyin to suppress Fang Guozhen. Tang conquered Yuyao, Shangyu, and Qinyuan successfully at the end of November, but Fang escaped over the sea, with the loss of only few units. Zhu Yuanzhang then ordered Liao Yuanzhong to support Tang with his own ships. The combined force pursued Fang's navy. At the end of December, Fang surrendered his four hundred ships and twenty-four thousand men. At the same time that Xu Da conquered northern China, Zhu's army was invading Fujian overland from the west. In support, Tang He and Liao Yuanzhong sailed to Fuzhou in January. Tang occupied the port after a short siege, and this led the coastal cities, including Xinhua, Zhangzhou, Quanzhou, to surrender soon afterward. The expeditionary force then pushed up along the river, capturing pro-Yuan warlord Chen Yuting alive. This completed the campaign in Fujian, and would be Tang's greatest military achievement. In March 1366, Tang returned to Ningbo to transport grain by sea to the north with Fang Guozhen's former staff, and put Liao in command of the fleet.

=== Conquest of North and West China ===
Tang accompanied the emperor to Kaifeng in August 1368. There, he was assigned a mission of conquering cities in northern Henan and southern Shanxi. After completing his mission, Tang joined Zhu's main army under Xu Da, and together they entered Shanxi in year 1369. The battle ended in September, and soon after, both Tang He and Xu Da were recalled to Nanjing to receive rewards from the emperor. However, because Tang had offended the emperor once in Changzhou after drinking, he received a lesser reward than the principals.

A few weeks later, Tang became Xu Da's deputy for the northern conquest, and was present in the great victory over Köke Temür(also known as Wang Baobao) at Gansu; afterwards Tang was detached from the main army and sent north. He conquered Xingxia and Ordos region, taking tens of thousand of livestock. His army stayed at the upper bend of Yellow River until the end of the year, when Tang and several other generals were recalled to Nanjing to a ceremony and to receive noble titles from the emperor. This time, Tang was given title of Marquis of Zhongshan, with annual salary of 1500 Shi. He was ranked seventh among Ming's nobility and first among marquis of that day. In February 1371, two armies, one land and one navy, were sent to Sichuan to conquer the state of Xia. Tang was put on overall command of the navy, with Liao Yuanzhong and Zhou Dexing as his deputies. His mission was to pass the gorges to Chongqing. However, Tang could not find a way past the gorges when the land force commanded by Fu Youde was pushing forward in progress, and Tang lost faith after several battles. Eventually, Liao Yuanzhong, whose entire career had been on water, found a way to break through with his own fleet, and the whole navy was able to continue upstream. Chongqing fell early in August, while Chengdu also surrendered in the same month. When Tang returned to the emperor in November, the emperor judged the reward of this campaign belongs to Liao Yuanzhong and Fu Youde, because of Tang's insufficient performance.

=== Defence against Mongols ===
In 1372, Tang commanded one of the armies against the Mongols in the north, and on 10 August, at Duantou Mountain, he suffered a severe defeat. Only two months later, Xu Da's main army was defeated by Köke Temür. After this, the emperor decided to set a defensive posture in the north. Tang himself was not punished for this loss, and in April of the following year, he was put in charge of an army on the northern frontier.

During the next two years, Tang supervised the training of troops, founding of military colonies, and the repair of walls of Beiping and Zhangde. At the end of 1374, Tang was called back to Nanjing for a while, but in February 1375, he returned to the military colonies in Shanxi. The death of Köke Temür in the same year reduce the pressure of the northern frontier for a while, but soon Boyan Temür took his place as leader of the Mongols and invaded Shanxi. Since the beginning of 1376, Tang, with Fu Youde and several other generals, stayed in Shanxi and resisted invasion from the Mongols for almost two years, until Boyan Temür left the region.

=== End of the career ===
In February 1378, Tang He was made the Duke of Xinguo. For the following two years, Tang led the training of troops in the northwestern region. At the beginning of 1381, Tang, as a deputy of Xu Da, achieved great success in the campaign against Mongols, and he remained in the newly occupied region for the following years. Then in year 1383, Tang was sent to command the army in Yong Ning, Sichuan, and the next year he inspected troops and military colonies in Fujian and Zhejiang in order to improve the defense against Japanese pirates (Wokou).

In year 1385, the emperor sent his sixth son, the king of Chu, Zhu Zhen, to suppress the rebellion in Guizhou known as the Wumian peasant revolt. Tang was sent as the nominal adviser for the prince, and also as the actual commander. After a hard-fought campaign, Tang captured forty thousand rebels and pacified the province in few months. After returning to the capital in February, 1386, Tang asked the emperor's permission to retire. Though impressed by his plea, Zhu Yuan Zhang thought Tang was still vigorous and assigned him a lighter mission to supervise the coast defenses in Zhejiang. In July 1388, Tang again submitted a request, which was approved. The emperor sent him off with generous rewards.

== Later years and evaluation ==
On New Year's Day of 1390, Tang lost his voice after suffering a stroke, and he only made rare public appearances thereafter. His health condition worsened during the following years. Eventually, Tang He died on 7 July 1395 at the age of sixty-nine. Tang was posthumously granted as prince of Dongwa, and given the name Duke Xinguo. Though irritating the emperor once and could only be adjudged as a mediocre commander, Tang retained Zhu Yuanzhang's favor to the end. The trust he gained from the emperor was based on the good friendship at childhood, and constantly support he gave at the time Zhu was challenged. This trust continued after 1380, because Tang was willing to give up his command at the time when Zhu was centralizing his military power. Tang was an example of a peasant who rose to power and fame at the beginning of Ming dynasty.

== Family ==
Tang He had five sons. The oldest, Tang Li, later reached the rank of vice commissioner in chief, but the dukedom was terminated. In 1492, the emperor, Zhu Youtang, appointed Tang's descendant in the sixth generation, Tang Shaozong, as the chief of embroidered uniform guard in Nanjing. His lineage received a hereditary title of marquis of Lingbi, and an annual salary of 1000 Shi that was inherited to the end of Ming dynasty. Tang He also had five daughters, the eldest become the concubine of Zhu Yuanzhang's tenth son, Zhu Tan, and her sister took her place in August 1387 after her death.
