= Hao Prefecture =

Administrative division of imperial China

Haozhou or Hao Prefecture (濠州) was a zhou (prefecture) in imperial China centering on modern Fengyang County, Anhui, China. It existed (intermittently) from 582 to 1367.

== Geography ==
The administrative region of Haozhou in the Tang dynasty is in modern Anhui. It probably includes parts of modern:

- Under the administration of Chuzhou:
  - Fengyang County
  - Mingguang
  - Dingyuan County
- Under the administration of Bengbu:
  - Bengbu
