= Xu Heng =

Chinese Confucianist and educator (1209–1281)

Xu Heng (Chinese: 許衡; 1209–1281), courtesy name Zhongping (仲平), posthumous name Duke Wenzheng of Wei (魏文正公), was a Confucianist and educator of the Yuan dynasty of China.

Xu Heng was born in present-day Xinyang of Henan Province, which was then governed by the Jin dynasty. At the age of 16, he studied Confucian Classics and became enamoured of it. In early 1230s, when the Jin dynasty was annihilated by the Mongols, he was captured, but soon freed. He then became a famous educator in Confucianism. After Kublai Khan's enthronement in 1260, Xu Heng, along with many other Confucianists such as Liu Bingzhong and Wang Xun, was invited by Kublai Khan to the court. He resigned next year, but was invited again later by Kublai Khan, and became an official of the Central Secretariat (Zhongshu Sheng). In 1261, Kublai Khan established the National Academy (Chinese: 國子學), with Xu Heng being its first leader (Chinese: 國子祭酒). Xu Heng was then devoted to education, and actively supported the spread of Neo-Confucianism. Later, he helped Guo Shoujing to formulate a new Chinese calendar known as Shoushili (Chinese: 授時曆). In 1280 he resigned and returned home, and died in the next year.
