= Chen Youding =

Yuan dynasty general (1330–1368)

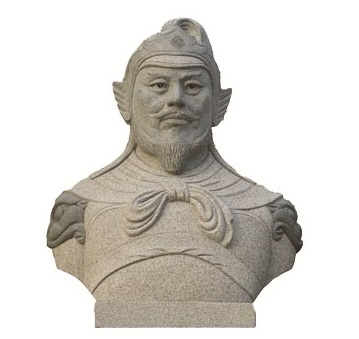
A modern bust of Chen Youding

Chen Youding (simplified Chinese: 陈友定; traditional Chinese: 陳友定; 1330–1368), courtesy names Anguo (安國), Guo'an (國安) or Yongqing (永卿), was a military leader of China's Yuan dynasty. He quelled various late-Yuan uprisings and the Ispah rebellion. He was finally promoted to the highest official in Fujian because of his military leadership and talent. After the fall of the Yuan dynasty, Chen refused to submit to the Ming dynasty and was eventually sentenced to death by the Hongwu Emperor.

== Name ==
He was also called 陳有定 which is also spelled Chen Youding. He was given the name Guo An (國安) or An Guo (安國) meaning 'peaceful country'. He was also called Yongqing (永卿).

== Birthplace ==
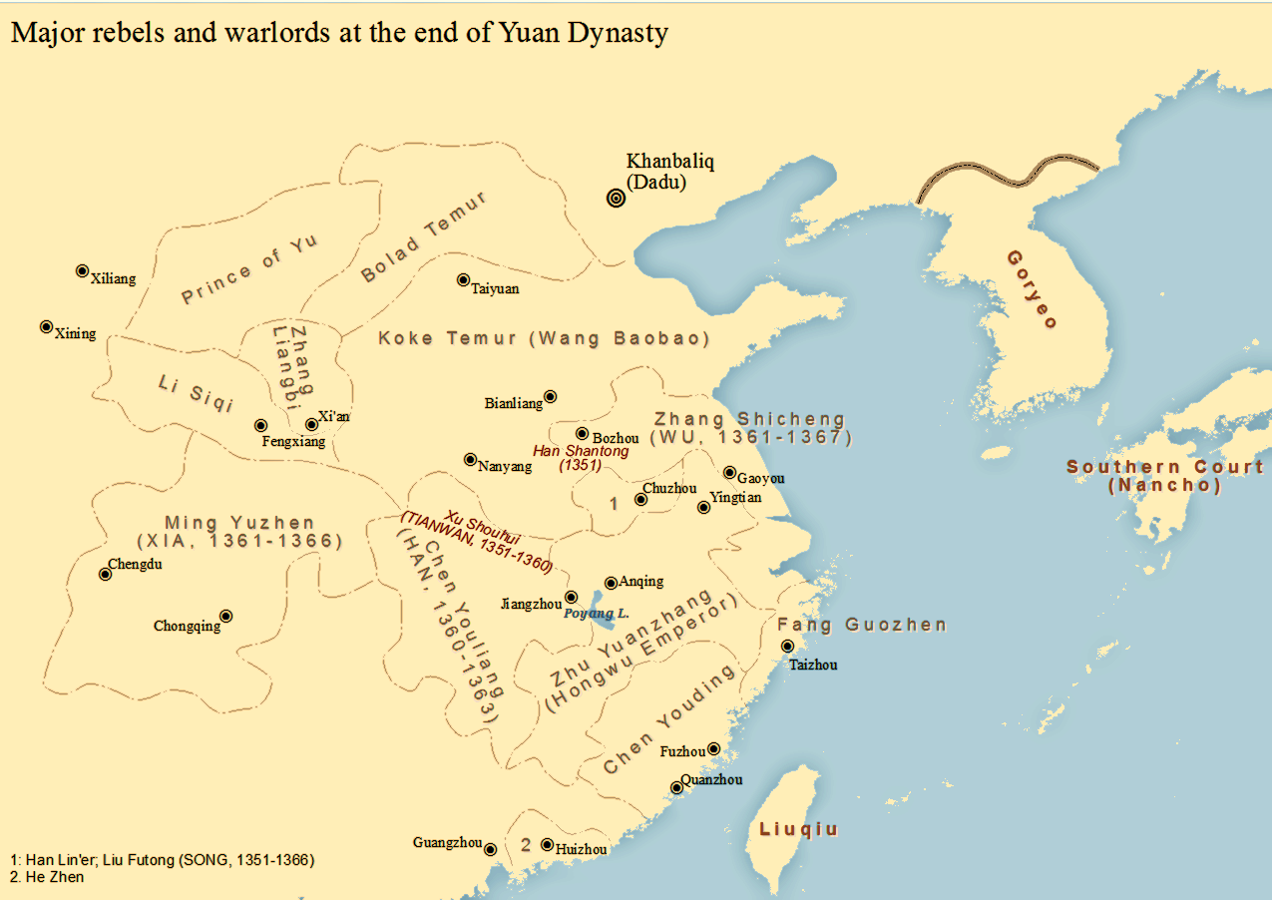
Map showing the location of Chen Youding's control area

He was a native of Yujian (玉澗), Fuqing County, Fuzhou, Fujian at the end of Yuan dynasty. When he was a teenager, he moved to Qingliu County, Tingzhou Prefecture to work as a farmer, and then joined the Yuan dynasty government army. He was described as a tall, brave and strong man.

== Career ==
After Yuan dynasty General Chen Youding crushed the Ispah Rebellion, he continued to rule over the Fujian even after the outbreak of the Red Turban Rebellion. Eventually, forces loyal to Ming dynasty founder Zhu Yuanzhang (Hongwu Emperor) took over Fujian in 1367. During the Yuan-Ming transition, he was executed by Zhu Yuanzhang.

== Influence and contributions ==
Chen Youding was a Han Chinese general who joined the Yuan dynasty. He was also one of the rare talented military generals in the Mongol-led Yuan government and armies at that time. These characteristics made him famous in the history of China. The Yuan Shi wrote about him in the 'Biography of Loyalty and Righteousness' (忠義傳). Jie Jin of the Ming dynasty praised him for "always doing his best" (始終盡節), and Wang Pei also praised him as one of the three loyal leaders in Fujian (福建三忠之一).
