= Antong =

Modern depiction of Antong

Antong (Chinese: 安童), alternatively rendered as Hantum (1245 or 1248–1293), of the Mongol Jalair clan, was a prominent official of the Yuan dynasty of China, serving during the reign of Kublai Khan (Emperor Shizu). As a great-grandson of Muqali, one of the greatest generals under Genghis Khan, he became an influential administrator in the administration of the Yuan dynasty, one of the chiefs of Kublai's administration.

He was born to Ba'atur (d. 1261), a grandson of Muqali, and Temülün, the elder sister of Kublai's wife Chabi.

Antong was well-educated in Confucianism, and had accompanied Kublai since he was still a boy. He had a good knowledge of Chinese law, and was one of the Mongolian aristocrats who were most popular with the Han. After the enthronement of Kublai in 1260, he was appointed the commander of the imperial guards, when he was only sixteen. In 1265, he was again appointed as the grand chancellor of the Central Secretariat (Zhongshu Sheng), and actively supported Kublai Khan to adopt and honor Confucianism and Han court rituals, and opposed the influence of Ahmad Fanakati.

In 1275, he was dispatched to assist Nomokhan, a son of Kublai Khan, to confront the attacks of Kaidu from Central Asia. He was captured due to the insurgency of his own underlings, and was handed over to Mengu-Timur, khan of the Golden Horde, who, in turn, passed him on to Kaidu. He was not allowed to return to the Yuan dynasty until 1284. However, he gradually lost the trust of Kublai Khan upon his return, and died in 1293. He was granted the posthumous name Prince Zhongxian of Dongping (Chinese: 東平忠憲王) by Temür Khan (Emperor Chengzong) in 1303.
