= Ahmad Fanakati =

Kublai Khan's finance minister

Ahmad Fanākatī, alternatively rendered as Ahmad Banākatī (Persian: احمد فناکتی / احمد بناکتی; simplified Chinese: 阿合马; traditional Chinese: 阿合馬; pinyin: Āhémǎ; before 1242 — 10 April 1282) was a Persian Muslim from the Qara Khitai (Western Liao dynasty) who served as chancellor and finance minister of the Yuan dynasty during Kublai's reign. He became known as a chief minister under Kublai and is credited with successfully establishing the financial system of the Yuan dynasty. He was considered to be a "villainous minister" in dynastic histories because of his perceived corruption.

== Life and career ==
Ahmad Fanākatī came from Fanākat (or Banākat), a town on the upper Syr Darya in Central Asia, under the rule of the Qara Khitai until they were conquered by the Mongol Empire.

Ahmad obtained employment under Kublai through Empress Jamui Khatun, who had known him before her marriage. To her court, he was originally attached but was already in high financial office in 1264.

Trusted by Chabi Khatun, Kublai's favorite wife, Ahmad was entrusted with state finances in 1262. He was successful in managing the financial affairs of Northern China and brought huge tax revenues to Kublai's new government. In 1270, he assumed the full power of the new financial department known as the Department of State Affairs (Shangshu Sheng), which had equal status with the administrative department known as the Central Secretariat (Zhongshu Sheng). After the conquest of the Song dynasty in 1276, he entered the financial matters of Southern China. He prepared a state monopoly in salt, which came to account for a large portion of state income. In his 20-year term of office, he created his strong faction with his clan and Muslims from Central Asia.

Ahmad's tax system gained a bad reputation from the Chinese because it was ruthlessly operated and considerably differed from traditional Chinese systems. Ahmad was reputed for his rapaciousness. He abused his position to gather riches for himself.

Marco Polo recorded his name as "Bailo Acmat (Achmac)". He mentions that Ahmad had 25 sons and accumulated great wealth.

In 1271, the Department of State Affairs was absorbed into the Central Secretariat. While holding the financial affairs, he started intervening in state administration. It heightened tension with the rival faction that included Crown Prince Zhenjin, Antong, the head of the Central Secretariat and other Mongol aristocrats, and Chinese bureaucrats. The death of his political patron Chabi Khatun in 1281 made the situation critical; Ahmad was assassinated by Wang Zhu and Gao Heshang (Kao Ho-chang) in the next year and his faction fell from power.

Although Ahmad's assassins were executed, after Kublai Khan heard all the complaints about Ahmad's corruption from his enemies, Kublai then ordered Ahmad's body to be taken from his tomb and desecrated by being eaten by dogs, and then using chariot wheels to smash the bones to pieces.

Kublai also ordered Ahmad's sons to be put to death.

== Influence ==
Ahmad is usually portrayed as an evil bureaucrat in traditional Chinese records: his corruption and tyranny are emphasized. In contrast, the Jami al-Tawarikh positively evaluates his assistance to Kublai's administration. The recent Mongolian studies also tend to make positive reference to his role in establishing the dynasty's unique financial system.

== In popular culture ==
Ahmad Fanakati was portrayed by Leonard Nimoy in the RAI mini-series Marco Polo during the 1980s, and by Mahesh Jadu as a primary antagonist in the second season of the Netflix series Marco Polo. He holds an influential role and is further described in the Jami al-Tawarikh.
