= Tianwan (Xu Shouhui) =

Rebel state in China (1351–1360)

Tianwan 天完
- 1351–1360
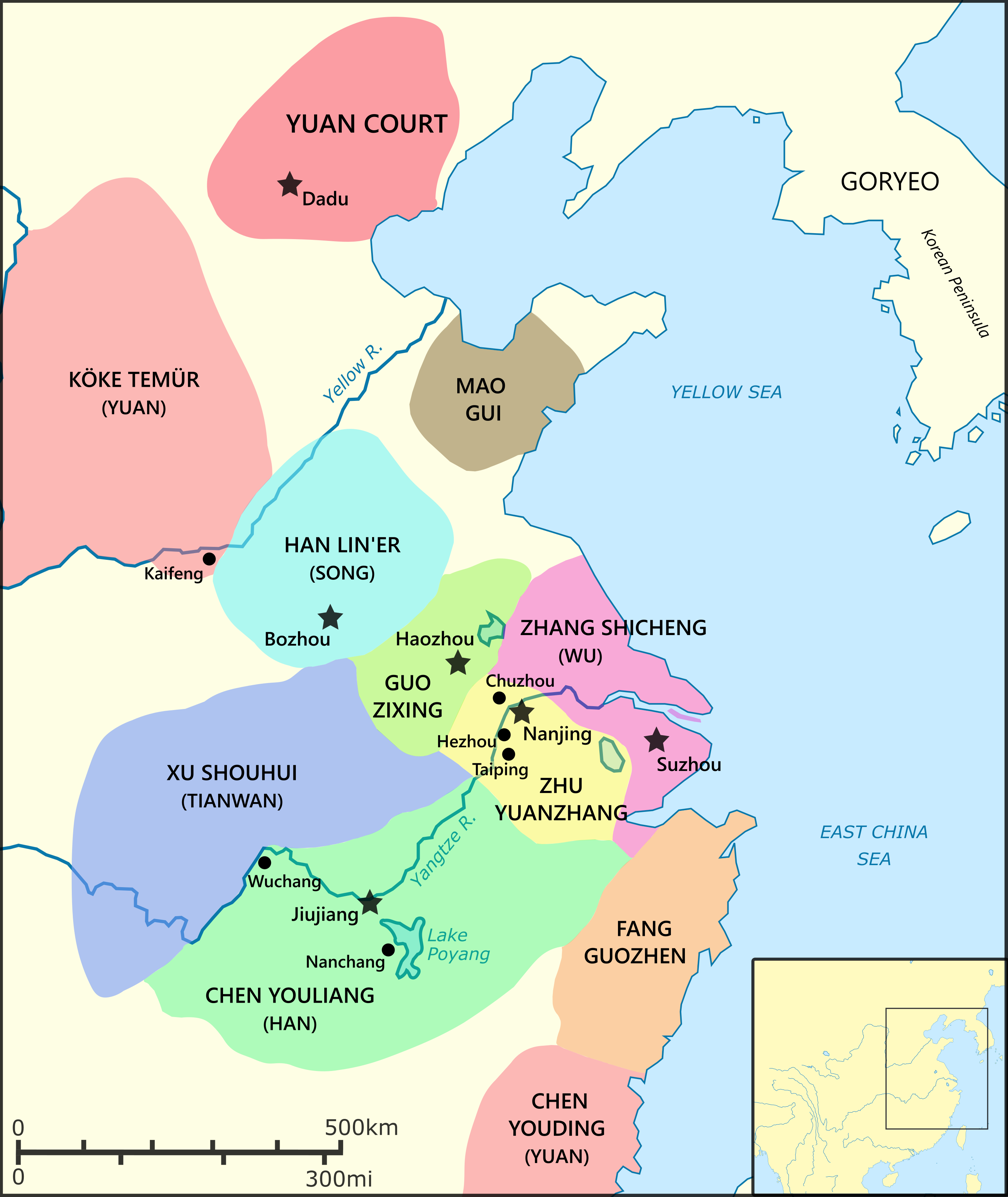
- Major powers in China during the late Yuan dynasty, c. 1350–1360, with Tianwan being marked in blue
- Capital: Qishui (1351–1353); Hanyang (1353–1360)
- Government: Monarchy
- Emperor
  - 1351–1360: Xu Shouhui
- History
  - Established: 1351
  - Disestablished: 1360
| Preceded by | Succeeded by |
| Yuan dynasty | State of Han; State of Longshu |
- Today part of: China

Chinese name
- Chinese: 天完
Transcriptions
Standard Mandarin
- Hanyu Pinyin: Tiānwán

Tianwan, contemporarily also known as Song, was a short-lived rebel state that existed in China during the Red Turban Rebellion, in the final phase of the Yuan dynasty. It was established in 1351 by Zou Pusheng, Peng Yingyu, and Xu Shouhui, who were leaders of the southern branch of the Red Turbans. Xu Shouhui became the emperor of this new state, but in 1360 Xu and his officials were killed by the rebelling general Chen Youliang. Chen then established his own state of Han, replacing the defunct Tianwan.

== Etymology ==
Starting with the History of Yuan, the official history of the Yuan dynasty written in 1369–1370 by a commission of historians selected by the Ming government (1368–1644), the state founded by the Southern Red Turbans was referred to as Tianwan (Heaven Consummated). However, in 1976 and 1982, tombs from 1371 and 1366 (Note: In 1976, the tomb of Yu Guang (于光;d. 1370), a dignitary who served under Xu Shouhui and later Zhu Yuanzhang, was discovered. The tomb contained an inscription by Song Lian, one of the leading authors of the History of Yuan. Most notably, in 1982, the tomb of Ming Yuzhen (d. 1366), a general under Xu Shouhui who later became an independent ruler, was found. This tomb also contained an inscription, written by Ming Yuchen's left prime minister, Dai Shou.) were discovered with inscriptions that referred to Xu Shouhui's state as Song (宋); in the latter case, its establishment was also dated back to 1350. This suggests that the name of Xu's state was actually Song, and that the state's color was red, which was likely chosen to align with the prestige of the empire of the same name that ruled China from 960 to 1125 in the north and 1279 in the south.

According to Chinese and Taiwanese historians, the name Song was replaced in the History of Yuan by the artificially created Tianwan (and then forgotten until the end of the 20th century) probably because Xu Shouhui's state of Song was four years older than the Northern Red Turban Song state led by Han Lin'er, which was proclaimed in 1355 (and if the Southern Red Turbans had already risen in 1350, then it also preceded the rebellion of Han Lin'er's father, Han Shantong). The existence of an older state of Song would have undermined the legitimacy of Han Lin'er's state and indirectly the legitimacy of Zhu Yuanzhang, the founder of the Ming dynasty, (Note: However, American historian Chan Hok-lam is skeptical of the above conclusions, arguing that Zhu Yuanzhang suppressed the remembrance of both mentioned Song states and his long-standing subordination to the regime of Han Lin'er.) who began his career among the rebels loyal to Han Lin'er and formally submitted to Han until 1367, thus benefiting from the authority of the Song name.

== Background ==
In the early 14th century, there were several rebellions against the Mongol-led Yuan dynasty in central China. A cadastral survey of southern landowners, announced in 1314, sparked a tax revolt in Jiangxi led by the self-declared king Cai Wujiu (蔡五九). In the early 1320s, after floods and subsequent crop failures, large numbers of refugees were labeled as bandits by the Yuan government. In 1325, Zhao Chousi (趙丑廝) led a rebellion in Xizhou, Henan. In 1337–38, Hu Run'er (胡閏兒) lef another rebellion in Runang, Henan. At the same time, Zhou Ziwang (周子旺) declared himself king of the state of Zhou on the border of Jiangxi and Hunan.

In the 1330s, the opposition to the Yuan gained strength. Groups of dissatisfied individuals were brought together by their shared faith and millenarian beliefs, influenced by Manichaeism and Buddhism. These rebels believed in the arrival of the "King of Light" (Mingwang) on earth, who would purify the world of evil and overthrow the Yuan government. In Hubei, the movement was led by Zou Pusheng (鄒普勝), a blacksmith, Xu Shouhui, a street vendor, and Peng Yingyu (彭瑩玉), a peasant and the ideological leader of the movement, as well as one of the leaders of the Zhou Ziwang rebellion.

At the same time, Han Shantong, the leader of the White Lotus, was preparing for a rebellion in northern Anhui and eastern Henan. He formed a loose alliance with Peng. In 1351, Han's followers took advantage of the people's anger over the difficult conditions of canal repair and incited them to rebel in May, centered at Yingzhou in Anhui. The rebel army, known as the "Red Turban Army" (hongjin jun, shortened to "Red Army" in contemporary accounts), grew rapidly and extended its influence to the south of the metropolitan area (present-day Hebei) and western Shandong.

== Founding, early expansion and nature of government ==
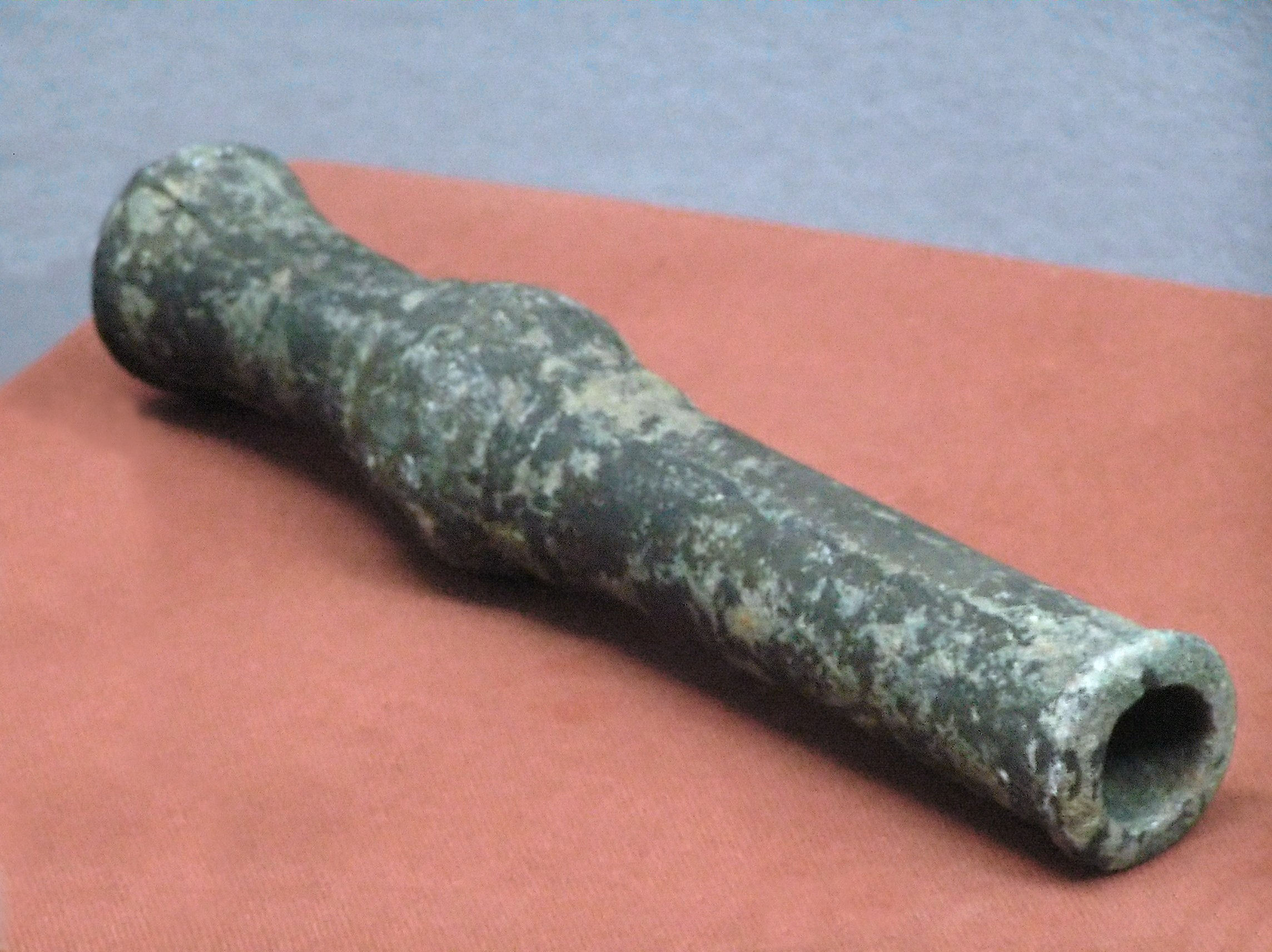
Yuan era bronze hand cannon

In August 1351, Zou Pusheng and Xu Shouhui responded by leading their own uprising in eastern Hubei, naming their army the "Southern Red Turban Army". In September of the same year, they established their headquarters in the newly conquered Qizhou, the prefectural capital, giving them control over northeastern Hubei. They declared the Zhiping (Equable Governing) era and established their own independent state in the occupied territory. Xu became emperor and Zou became the grand marshal (taishuai). They set up an administration based on the Yuan model, establishing the Central Secretariat, six ministries, the Censorate, and the Hanlin Academy. The controlled territory was divided into four provinces (xingsheng).

In 1352–1353, the state of Tianwan experienced rapid growth in its territory. The success of the Red Army can be attributed to its strict discipline and fair treatment of civilians. Zou incorporated various smaller rebel and local groups into his forces or allied with them, gaining control over central and northern Hubei. In the early spring of 1352, he seized Hanyang and shortly after, on the opposite bank of the Yangtze River, he took control of Wuchang, the capital of the Yuan province of Huguang. He then advanced downstream to Jiujiang, a major port in Jiangxi on the Yangtze River. Meanwhile, other Tianwan armies captured Nanchang, the central city of Jiangxi, and Changsha, the central city of Hunan.

The lower classes and peasants formed the social base of the rebel movement in the middle reaches of the Yangtze River. However, the leaders of the rebels were a diverse group, including wandering monks, peddlers, fishermen, boatmen, and lower officials. They were collectively referred to as "uprooted people" in the History of Yuan. The main target of the rebels were the traditional Chinese elites, who were also the main supporters of the despised Yuan government.

According to the classic analysis of Chinese historian Meng Siming, the uprising in this region took on the characteristics of a Chinese civil class war. In this tradition, Chinese historians refer to the Red Turbans as a "peasant movement" and the Tianwan regime as a "peasant government", but Western scholars tend to downplay the significance of class differences in the country. (Note: For example, Mote (1988), p. 39) Despite this, contemporary observers still described the rebels as a movement of the lower classes targeting the wealthy and powerful households. The central slogan of the Tianwan regime, "Take from the rich to relieve the poor" (cuifu yipin), and the widespread slogan in the lower Yangtze River region, "Servants, kill your masters" (cangtou shizhu), demonstrate the importance of class differences. The new regime's initial egalitarian and redistributive measures eventually faded into the background, and its administrative apparatus quickly adopted traditional patterns of operation. After 1353, the Tianwan regime actively courted landowners to participate in its government.

== Crisis and new expansion ==
In 1353, the Tianwan regime faced significant challenges. A three-year drought, accompanied by epidemics and famine, caused widespread suffering. In the summer of 1353, a 400,000-strong army led by Yuan chancellor Toqto'a and his allies attacked the regime's center of power in eastern Hubei during the summer. By fall, Toqto'a's forces had captured the Tianwan capital of Qishui. Although Emperor Xu Shouhui managed to escape, about 400 officials, including the commander-in-chief Zuo Pusheng, were killed. (Note: According to another version of events, Zou Pusheng only lost his power position in favor of Ni Wenjun and regained his influence over Xu Shouhui after Ni's death. He even survived the fall of the state of Tianwan, and in 1360, Chen Youliang, the emperor of Han, confirmed him in the office of Grand Preceptor.) The remaining court members went into hiding in the mountains of Huangmei County. In January 1355, Toqto'a was exiled due to his unpopularity with the population. His army disbanded, and the Yuan government lost control over loyalists and was unable to suppress rebel forces. Its influence over provincial affairs quickly diminished.

Ni Wenjun escaped from Qishui and took control of the Tianwan court after Zuo Pusheng's death. Xu Shouhui granted Ni, one of his earliest supporters, the title of prime minister (chengxiang) in the Qishui court and commander of the fleet, which was crucial in a region with many waterways. Ni's fleet successfully captured Mianyang in Sichuan in early 1355 and then recaptured Hanyang. To solidify the Xu family's position in the southern part of the state, Xu appointed his son as king in Changsha. In the winter of 1355/56, Xu moved to Hanyang and changed his era name to Tianqi (Inauguated by Heaven). He changed the name again to Taiping (Grand Tranquility) in 1358. Tianwan's power now extended to all of Huguang, Jiangxi, and later parts of Shaanxi.

In 1357, a Tianwan army of 10,000 men, led by Ming Yuzhen, embarked on a journey up the Yangtze River towards Sichuan. The main motivation for this expedition was the issue of feeding the army in Hubei, where food shortages were prevalent. Upon conquering Sichuan, Ming assumed virtual autonomy and ruled in the name of Xu Shouhui.

== Fall ==
Ni Wenjun's ambitions continued to grow, leading him to attempt to assassinate Xu Shouhui and seize power in 1357. His plan was foiled and he was killed by his own general, Chen Youliang. After Ni's death, Chen declared himself minister of state (pingzhang) and left Xu on the throne in Hanyang. He then established his base in northern Jiangxi. In early 1360, Chen declared himself King of Han and made Jiujiang his capital. In June of that year, he launched an attack on Hanyang and killed Xu and most of the Tianwan court. Chen then declared himself emperor of the state of Han and took control of most of Tianwan's territory. The only region that remained independent was Sichuan, where Ming Yuzhen declared himself king of the state of Longshu. In 1362, Ming proclaimed himself emperor of the state of Xia.

The new state of Han was even more short-lived than Tianwan. In 1360, Chen Youliang invaded Zhu Yuanzhang's eastern domain of Wu, centered in Nanjing. The resulting war reached its climax at the Battle of Lake Poyang in the fall of 1363, where Chen was killed and his army was defeated. By the spring of 1365, Zhu had incorporated the Han territories into his domain.
