= Deng Yu (Ming dynasty) =

Chinese general (1337–1377)

- 鄧兪

Personal details
- Born: Deng Youde (Note: Chinese: 鄧友德; pinyin: Dèng Yǒudé); 17 March 1337 Si County, Anhui
- Died: 9 November 1377 (aged 40) Shou County, Anhui
- Occupation: General
- Title: Duke of Wei (Note: Simplified Chinese: 卫国公; traditional Chinese: 衛國公; pinyin: Wèi Guógōng); Prince of Ninghe (Note: Simplified Chinese: 宁河王; traditional Chinese: 寧河王; pinyin: Nínghé Wáng) (posthumously)
- Posthumous name: Wushun (Note: Simplified Chinese: 武顺; traditional Chinese: 武順; pinyin: Wǔshùn)

Chinese name
- Chinese: 鄧兪
Transcriptions
Standard Mandarin
- Hanyu Pinyin: Dèng Yú

Deng Yu (17 March 1337 – 9 December 1377) was one of the founding generals of the Ming dynasty of China. He was among the leading military commanders of the Hongwu Emperor, the first emperor of the Ming.

Born into a commoner family in Anhui, Deng joined the Red Turban Rebellion during the final years of the Mongol-led Yuan dynasty and aligned himself with Zhu Yuanzhang (the future Hongwu Emperor) in the mid-1350s. He held important commands during the campaigns in Zhejiang and Jiangxi, notably co-commanding the defense of the strategically important city of Nanchang against the forces of the rebel state of Han. Following the founding of the Ming dynasty in 1368, Deng led major campaigns to secure Henan and Shanxi, inflicted a decisive defeat on the Mongol general Köke Temür in 1370, and later commanded military operations in Guangxi, Sichuan, and Tibet. His descendants remained an influential military family throughout the Ming dynasty until its fall in 1644.

== Biography ==
Deng Yu was born on 17 March 1337 in Hong County, located in central China (present-day Si County, Suzhou, Anhui). He was one of the commoners from Anhui who joined the Red Turban Rebellion against the Mongol-led Yuan dynasty, which ruled China at the time. By the mid-1350s, he had joined forces with Zhu Yuanzhang, a general of the rebel state of Song. Deng participated in Zhu's conquest of inland Zhejiang in 1358. He then went on to serve in Jiangxi, where Zhu was attempting to conquer the state of Han.

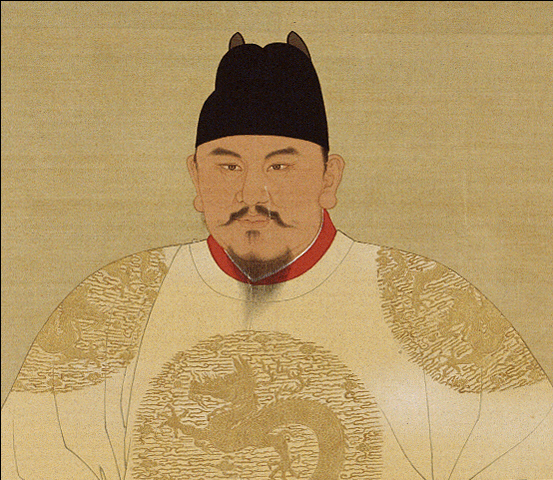
Portrait of Zhu Yuanzhang as the Hongwu Emperor

In early 1362, Deng was in command of the garrison in Nanchang, an important city in Jiangxi. In April of that year, Nanchang was unexpectedly attacked by Zhu Zong (祝宗) and Kang Tai (康泰), former Han generals who had defected to Zhu Yuanzhang's side but had now returned to the Han side. The attacking generals' artillery destroyed the city walls and their infantry stormed in. Deng had no choice but to flee. A month later, Nanchang was recaptured by Xu Da's troops, who had been recalled from the siege of Wuchang. Zhu Yuanzhang appointed Zhu Wenzheng as the new commander of Nanchang, with Deng serving as his deputy. The garrison was reinforced and Nanchang was fortified.

The careful preparation paid off when a Han army besieged Nanchang in June 1363. Nanchang successfully held out until Zhu Yuanzhang arrived in late August and won the war at the Battle of Lake Poyang. In October 1363, Zhu sent Deng and Li Shanchang to command the defense of Nanjing. The following year, Deng participated in the pacification of Jiangxi. In February 1365, Zhu Yuanzhang dismissed Zhu Wenzheng and appointed Deng to take command of Nanchang. Deng held the rank of junior administrator of the branch secretariat of Jiangxi. Three months later, he was transferred to Huguang, where he oversaw the demobilization of former Han soldiers and their conversion into soldier-peasants.

In November 1367, Deng was appointed right censor-in-chief, and in February 1368, he was included among the tutors of the heir to the throne. In early 1368, Zhu Yuanzhang declared himself emperor, named his state the Ming, and appointed his son Zhu Biao as his heir. In February 1368, Deng launched attacks on Yuan positions in southern Henan. He successfully cleared the adjacent areas of Shanxi by 1369. In early 1370, under Xu Da's leadership, he marched from Xi'an against the Mongol army led by Köke Temür. Deng emerged victorious, driving Köke Temür back into Mongolia and capturing 84,000 enemy soldiers.

After the generals returned from the campaign in December 1370, the Hongwu Emperor granted Deng Yu the title of Duke of Wei, ranking him sixth in precedence among those who received noble titles at that time. The following year, Deng oversaw the supply of troops for the attack on Sichuan. In 1372, he led the army in suppressing rebellions in Huguang and Guangxi. He was then given the task of conquering Tibet in February 1373. However, in early 1374, Xu Da and Tang He suffered defeats at the hands of the Mongols in the north, leading to Deng being appointed as one of Xu's deputies on the northern border. Later that year, he was transferred to Shaanxi, where he oversaw the construction of military farms.

Deng did not take to the field until 1377, when he, with Mu Ying as his deputy, marched against the rebellious Tibetans. The Chinese penetrated deep into Tibetan territory at Lake Koko Nor and reached the Kunlun Mountains, defeating the enemy and capturing a large number of cattle and horses. On his way back to the capital, Deng died in Shouchun, Anhui on 9 December 1377. The Emperor honored Deng's contributions to the state by granting him the posthumous title of Prince of Ninghe and the posthumous name of Wushun.

Deng had five sons. His eldest son, Deng Zhen (鄧鎮), was an officer and became the Duke of Shen (申國公) in 1380. He was executed in 1390 at the age of twenty-two on false charges of belonging to the Li Shanchang clique. The ducal title was inherited by his adopted son, Deng Yuan (鄧源), who was the son of his younger brother, Deng Ming (鄧銘). The Deng family lost their ducal title during the Yongle era, but they continued to serve in the military. In 1532, they were granted the title of Marquis of Dingyuan. The last marquis died in 1644 during the fall of Beijing.
