= Chen Han =

Rebel state in China (1360–1364)

Great Han 大漢
- 1360–1364
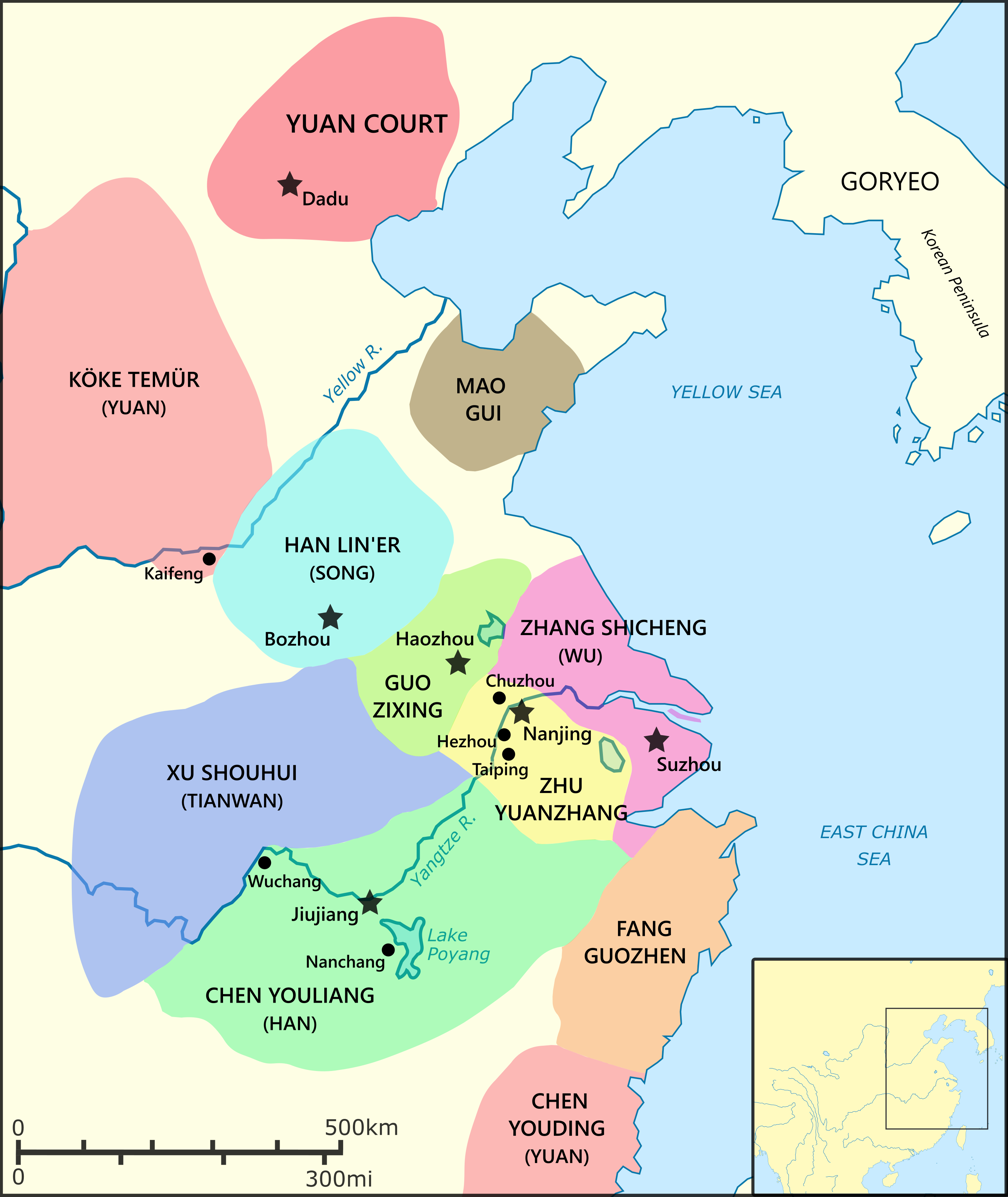
- Major powers in China during the late Yuan dynasty, c. 1350–1360, with Chen Han being marked in green
- Capital: Jiujiang, later Wuchang
- Government: Monarchy
- Emperor
  - 1360–1363: Chen Youliang
  - 1363–1364: Chen Li
- History
  - Established: 1360
  - Disestablished: 1364
Preceded by	Succeeded by
State of Tianwan	Zhu Yuanzhang's state of Wu
- Today part of: China

Chinese name
- Traditional Chinese: 陳漢
- Simplified Chinese: 陈汉
Transcriptions
Standard Mandarin
- Hanyu Pinyin: Chén Hàn

Dynastic name
- Traditional Chinese: 大漢
- Simplified Chinese: 大汉
Transcriptions
Standard Mandarin
- Hanyu Pinyin: Dà Hàn

Chen Han, officially the Great Han, was a short-lived rebel state that existed in China during the Red Turban Rebellion, in the final phase of the Yuan dynasty. It was founded in Jiangxi in 1360 by Chen Youliang, who had been ruling there since 1357 on behalf of the rebel state of Tianwan, which he overthrew in the same year. The state of Han fell in 1364 when Chen Youliang's son and successor, Chen Li, surrendered to Zhu Yuanzhang's forces.

== Founding ==
In the early 14th century, several rebellions erupted against the Mongol-led Yuan dynasty in central China. During the 1330s, opposition to Yuan rule grew stronger as various groups of disaffected people united through shared religious and millenarian beliefs influenced by Manichaeism and Buddhism. Known as the Red Turbans, these rebels believed in the coming of the "King of Light" (Mingwang), a messianic figure who would cleanse the world of evil and overthrow the Yuan government. In Hubei, the movement was led by Zou Pusheng (鄒普勝), a blacksmith; Xu Shouhui, a street vendor; and Peng Yingyu (彭瑩玉), a peasant who served as its principal ideologue. In August 1351, Zou and Xu launched an uprising in eastern Hubei. The following month, they established their headquarters at the newly captured city of Qizhou, the prefectural capital, thereby securing control over northeastern Hubei. They also founded an independent state known as Tianwan, with Xu enthroned as emperor and Zou serving as grand marshal. In 1357, the state of Tianwan was in serious crisis. Xu faced an assassination attempt from his prime minister, Ni Wenjun, who was himself killed by his subordinate Chen Youliang. Chen then established his own domain in northern Jiangxi.

In early 1360, Chen declared himself King of Han with his capital at Jiujiang. He then attacked the Tianwan capital of Hanyang and killed Xu and most of the Tianwan court. He declared himself emperor of the Great Han in June 1360 and occupied most of the Tianwan territories. Only in Sichuan did the local governor, Ming Yuzhen, retain his independence as King of the Longshu state from 1360 and emperor of the Great Xia from 1362.

Chen established a reliable central government, but at the regional and local levels his authority was unstable and often contested. His closest associates included the chief advisor Zhang Bixian (張必先) and the grand marshal Zhang Dingbian (張定邊). He also elevated his brothers by granting them princely titles, the closest of whom was Chen Youren (陳友仁).

== War with Zhu Yuanzhang ==
In 1360, Chen Youliang decided to attack the eastern Song province of Jiangnan, which was under the rule of Zhu Yuanzhang. (Note: Song, officially the Great Song, was a Red Turban rebel state that was established in 1355. It claimed to be the successor of the Song dynasty (960–1279). The state's power reached its peak in 1358 when the Song army captured Kaifeng, the former capital of the Song dynasty. However, in 1359, the Yuan warlord Chaghan Temur recaptured Kaifeng and forced the Song emperor Han Lin'er and his court to relocate to Anfeng. Zhu Yuanzhang, an independent rebel leader, declared his allegiance to Han Lin'er and was appointed as the head of the Jiangnan Province in 1356. In 1361, Han Lin'er named him the Duke of Wu.) He suggested to Zhu's eastern rival Zhang Shicheng a joint attack on Jiangnan, but Zhang did not take any action. The Han army began their attack by marching on Nanjing, but the defenders were well-prepared and successfully repelled the attack. The Han army suffered a loss of approximately twenty thousand soldiers, and the enemy was able to capture over 100 large ships and several hundred smaller ones, giving them an advantage on the rivers in 1361–1362.

In 1361, the Han army was forced to switch to a defensive strategy. Zhu successfully captured Jiujiang and blocked Chen's remaining forces in Wuchang. Zhu then established himself in Nanchang. During the winter of 1361–62, he solidified his control over the conquered territory. However, he left Nanchang before fully securing the conquered territories in Jiangxi Province. He had to rely on troops withdrawn from the Wuchang area to suppress subsequent rebellions. Another rebellion in the east in Zhejiang, along with betrayals from senior commanders, weakened Zhu's regime, which was forced to focus its main forces on the active Zhang Shicheng in the east. The Han government took advantage of the situation and launched a counter-offensive, successfully retaking Jiujiang and Anqing in August 1361. In September of the same year, Zhu sent a fleet to attack the Han, besieging Anqing and then moving on to Hukou, the entrance to Lake Poyang. Zhu's forces defeated the Han fleet before Jiujiang, captured the city, and attempted to attack Hanyang but were unsuccessful. Zhu then established his main forces in Jiujiang and gained control of Jiangxi. In early 1362, the Han garrison commander of Nanchang, Hu Mei, and his troops surrendered to Zhu and joined his army. This surrender solidified Zhu's control over Jiangxi, giving him the upper hand in the region.

The assassination of the Yuan warlord Chaghan Temur on 6 July 1362 caused chaos in northern China, since Yuan loyalists did not have enough force to suppress rebellions, and allowed the Chinese rebels on the Yangtze River to gain their freedom. From January to September 1363, Zhu's main forces were occupied in the north in Anhui, where they battled against Zhang's troops (Note: On 16 February 1363, Zhang Shicheng's forces launched a surprise attack on the Song capital of Anfeng, resulting in the death of its de facto leader Liu Futong and the capture of Emperor Han Lin'er. Zhu Yuanzhang personally led the campaign to retake Anfeng and successfully rescued Han Lin'er. He also confronted the warlord of Luzhou, who had aided Zhang's invasion.) and the Yuan forces. This diversion of the enemy's main forces gave Chen the opportunity to try and recapture Jiangxi. He gathered soldiers from Hubei and Hunan and constructed a new fleet. With an army of 300,000, he outnumbered Zhu's main forces. Chen's plan was to capture Nanchang and then persuade the local commanders in Jiangxi to join his side. He would then use their forces to attack Nanjing.

Although the Nanchang garrison, led by Zhu Wenzheng and Deng Yu, had been defending against the siege since early June 1363, Zhu Yuanzhang did not become aware of the gravity of the situation until early August 1363. This was a failure of intelligence, in stark contrast to the early warning received in 1360. Zhu was preoccupied with issues in the north and east, which may have contributed to this lack of awareness. (Note: The siege of Luzhou and the uprising of Xie Zaixing, commander of a fortress in Zhejiang near the border with Zhang Shicheng's state of Wu.) On 15 August 1363, his army marched from Nanjing to confront the Han with approximately 100,000 soldiers. This was a similar number to the army in 1360, with additional troops having been dispersed throughout Zhejiang and stationed in garrisons in Nanchang and Nanjing.

On 30 August, the two fleets engaged in a four-day battle on Lake Poyang. During the first two days, Zhu's fleet suffered significant losses and retreated, but on the third day, Zhu utilized suicide attacks with gunpowder-filled "fire ships". These explosions had a devastating impact on the tightly formed Han lines, causing hundreds of ships to sink, along with Chen's two brothers. (Note: Chen Youren and Chen Yougui.) The attackers also suffered heavy losses, leading them to spend the following day to repair their ships. The battle resumed on 2 September, with the Han fleet gaining the upper hand and ultimately taking control of the battlefield. At the same time, Zhu's land forces, led by Hu Deji (胡德濟), successfully lifted the siege of Nanchang, the main objective of the campaign. Zhu then abandoned the battle and swiftly moved to blockade the Han's fleet in the lake. On 3 October, Chen attempted to escape from the lake with his fleet. Zhu set fire ships adrift, scattering the Han fleet and breaking it into isolated groups that were engaged separately by his forces. Chen was killed when an arrow struck his head. This event greatly demoralized many officers, leading them to surrender. Chen's grand marshal Zhang Dingbian managed to escape to Wuchang with the ruler's young son, Chen Li.

== Fall ==
Chen Li ascended the Han throne and continued the war. He withstood a two-month siege of Wuchang in late 1363 but was unable to effectively resist Zhu's advancing forces. When Zhu's army once again approached Wuchang in March 1364, the helpless Chen Li surrendered. Zhu then focused on occupying and absorbing Han territories. While many prefectural and county commanders surrendered without a fight, the occupation of Hubei, Hunan, and Jiangxi dragged on until April 1365.

Despite their defeat, the Chen family maintained their status among the nobility. Chen Li, along with his grandfather Chen Pucai and his uncles Chen Youfu and Chen Youzhi, were granted high titles and incomes. In 1372, after a conflict with members of Zhu Yuanzhang's entourage, Chen Li was sent to Korea.
