= Tiantong =

Tiantong may refer to:

- Tiantong Temple (天童寺), a Buddhist temple in Ningbo, Zhejiang, China.
- Tiantong (Satellite) Chinese communications satellite.

== Historical eras ==
- Tiantong (天統, 565–569), era name used by Gao Wei, emperor of Northern Qi.
- Tiantong (天統, 1363–1366), era name used by Ming Yuzhen, emperor of Great Xia.
