= Great Xia =

Great Xia may refer to:

- Daxia, the name given in antiquity by the Han Chinese to Bactria
- Ming Xia, a Chinese dynasty
- Western Xia, an imperial dynasty of China
- Xia (Sixteen Kingdoms), a dynastic state of Xiongnu
