= Zhang Shicheng's state =

Rebel state in China (1354–1367)

Great Zhou (1354–1357) 大周 Wu (1363–1367) 吳
- 1354–1367
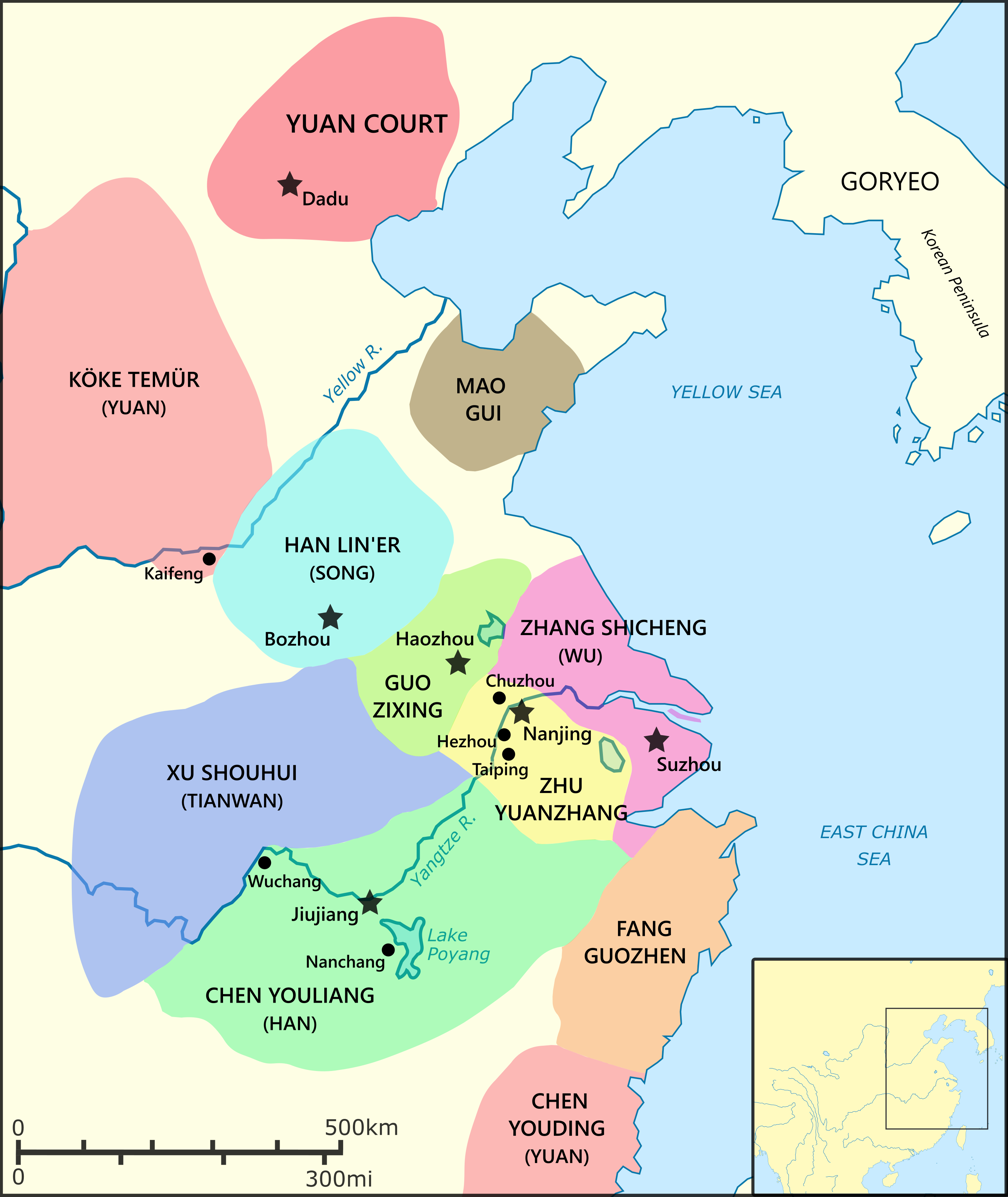
- Major powers in China during the late Yuan dynasty, c. 1350–1360, with Zhang Shicheng's state being marked in pink
- Capital: Gaoyou; Suzhou (from 1356)
- Government: Monarchy
- Ruler
  - 1354–1367: Zhang Shicheng
- History
  - Zhang Shicheng's claim of royal title: 1354
  - Submission to the Yuan government: 1357
  - Zhang Shicheng's proclamation as Prince of Wu: 1363
  - Fall of Suzhou; Zhang Shicheng's capture by Zhu Yuanzhang: 1367
Preceded by	Succeeded by
Yuan dynasty	Zhu Yuanzhang's state of Wu
- Today part of: China

Zhang Shicheng was a rebel leader during the Red Turban Rebellion against the Mongol-led Yuan dynasty in China. In 1354, he proclaimed himself King Cheng of the new state of "Great Zhou". Initially confined to a small area around Gaoyou in central Jiangsu, his domain expanded in 1355–1356 to encompass parts of northern Zhejiang south of the Yangtze River. In 1356, Zhang relocated to Suzhou and surrendered to Yuan rule the following year, giving up his royal title. In 1363, however, Zhang rebelled against the Yuan again and proclaimed himself "King of Wu", while his rival Zhu Yuanzhang adopted the same title in early 1364. This led to a war between the two states, resulting in the downfall of Zhang's state. In 1367, Zhu absorbed it into his own state, which later became the Ming dynasty in early 1368.

== History ==
In the early 14th century, the harsh taxation policies and famine, together with catastrophic flooding in the Yellow River basin caused by inadequate flood control measures, led to widespread opposition to the rule of the Mongol-led Yuan dynasty. The presence of Taoist and Buddhist secret societies and sects further fueled this discontent, the most prominent being the White Lotus society. In 1351, the Red Turban Rebellion erupted and quickly spread throughout northern China. In late 1353, Zhang Shicheng, the leader of the rebellious salt producers and smugglers in northern and central Jiangsu, gained control of Gaoyou, a prefecture-level city located 40 km north of Yangzhou. He also controlled traffic on the Grand Canal, a major waterway linking northern and southern China. Zhang declared himself King Cheng (誠王) of the state of Great Zhou (大周), adopted the era name Tianyou (天佑; 'Sustained by Heaven'), and distributed official positions among his followers.

In the summer of 1354, the Yuan forces at Yangzhou, the major garrision in the region, launched an attack on the new state, but their attempt was unsuccessful. The Yuan government in Beijing then offered Zhang amnesty, high rank, and titles. Zhang initially received the envoys and began negotiations, but he eventually had them killed. The Yuan government then resorted to force, sending an army led by the commander Toqto'a to Gaoyou. The siege began on 24 November 1354. Despite repeatedly crushing Zhang's troops outside the city and clearing the surrounding countryside of rebels, Toqto'a's command was stripped on 7 January 1355. (Note: Toqto'a was stripped of all his civil and military posts and sent into exile on the Yunnan frontier. One year later, he was poisoned in exile by agents of his enemies, who had come to dominate the court during his absence.) This caused the army to disintegrate, with some soldiers joining bandits. The Yuan government once again offered Zhang amnesty and a position, but he refused and instead occupied northern Jiangsu.

The conquered territory was ravaged by epidemics and famine. Zhang Shicheng turned his focus toward the vastly richer, more populous, and relatively peaceful region of Wu in the Yangtze delta, stretching from Suzhou to Hangzhou. Zhang was hesitant because of its linguistic diversity. In late 1355, he dispatched his younger brother, Zhang Shide, to cross the Yangtze River. Zhang Shide successfully captured the first major city, Changshu, in February 1356, followed by Suzhou in March. In April 1356, Zhang Shicheng relocated to Suzhou. Over the next few months, Zhang Shide's army advanced west beyond Changzhou and south into northern Zhejiang, but their attempt to attack Hangzhou was unsuccessful. Zhang Shicheng was not the only leader seeking to control the wealthy regions south of the Yangtze River. Further west, Zhu Yuanzhang, another prominent leader of the Red Turban movement, also crossed the river and captured Nanjing and the surrounding region in the spring of 1356. The state of Zhou emerged as a dominant regional power, bordered by Zhu's territory to the west and the Yuan garrison in Hangzhou to the south, with both parties in a state of hostility. In the north, Zhou's influence extended as far as Shandong.

In the summer of 1357, Zhu Yuanzhang captured Zhang Shide, and tried to use him to bargain for Zhang Shicheng's surrender. Zhang Shide secretly sent a letter to his brother telling him to surrender to the Yuan instead, then starved himself to death in prison. The death of Zhang Shide was a heavy loss for Zhang Shicheng. Zhang Shide had been the most aggressive and capable of his brother's field commanders, as well as the most disciplined and energetic of his political aides. Under pressure on both fronts, from Zhu Yuanzhang and from the growing Yuan forces in Hangzhou, Zhang Shicheng gave up his royal title in late 1357 and submitted to the Yuan government. In return, he was granted the rank of grand marshal, and his officials were given provincial and local ranks and titles. Despite these changes, the de facto power structure remained unchanged, and Zhang retained his independence.

To the west of Zhu's territory lay Chen Youliang's state of Han, which encompassed parts of present-day Jiangxi and Hubei provinces. A more decisive Zhang, cooperating with Chen, might have been able to defeat Zhu, whose regime was still in its early stages. However, Zhang appeared largely content to defend his hold on the lower Yangtze, and his only two attacks on Zhu’s territories were decisively defeated. Following Chen's defeat and death at the hands of Zhu in the Battle of Lake Poyang, Zhang proclaimed himself King of Wu (吳王) in October 1363. Zhu, who had held the title Duke of Wu (吳國公) since 1361, proclaimed himself King of Wu on 4 February 1364.

With Zhu's forces engaged in the conquest of the state of Han, Zhang launched a preemptive attack on Zhu's territory in late 1364. He hoped to gain an advantage before Zhu could exploit the resources and manpower of the newly conquered territories. The offensive was repelled in the spring of 1365, and a counterattack followed. Together with his generals, Zhu decided to first weaken Zhang's state by occupying the territory north of the Yangtze River and Zhang-controlled Zhejiang before attacking its capital, Suzhou. Zhu appointed Xu Da as the supreme commander of the attacking forces, and they executed the plan easily due to the superior strength of Zhu's army. The ten-month siege of Suzhou began in December 1366. In October 1367, Zhu's forces breached the walls of Suzhou and all of Wu was pacified. Zhu's forces captured Zhang and took him to Nanjing, where Zhang committed suicide. In early 1368, Zhu changed the name of his state from Wu to Ming and declared himself emperor.

== Government ==
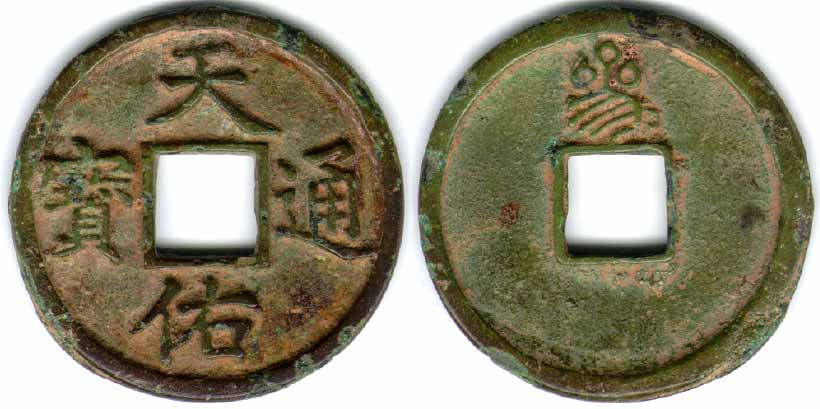
Tianyou Tongbao (天佑通寶) cash coin, produced under Zhang Shicheng

Zhang Shicheng's regime was mostly patterned on the Yuan dynasty model, but also made use of some earlier traditional Chinese terminology. His rule, which was highly influenced by Confucian ideals, gained the support of the gentry, which was crucial in the wealthy and economically developed regions under his control. In 1354, shortly after establishing the state of Zhou, Zhang promulgated the Order to Promote Agriculture and Sericulture in the Prefectures and Counties (州縣務農桑令). The proclamation attributed the turmoil under Yuan rule to widespread poverty and to officials who failed to convey the ruler’s benevolent intent, imposed arbitrary regulations for personal gain, and neglected the people's suffering. Zhang declared that he had raised troops to rescue the people from misery and bring them security. He stressed that food was the people's essential need and that agriculture and sericulture were the foundation of their livelihood. He called on officials to act as circumstances warranted and ensure that people everywhere had the means to support themselves, rather than allowing the measures to become mere formalities.

Zhang also mobilized troops and local farmers to reclaim wasteland outside Suzhou, dividing it into two areas known as the Southern and Northern Gardens and planting them with grain crops. Zhang exempted local farmers from taxes for one year. After crossing the Yangtze River in 1356, he cancelled all outstanding agricultural tax arrears owed to the Yuan government and remitted 40 percent of that year's taxes. Grain and clothing from landlords and wealthy households were distributed to the poor and elderly. He also established the posts of agricultural development commissioner (勸農使; quannongshi) and agricultural development commandant (勸農慰; quannongwei) at the prefectural and county levels, respectively, to oversee agricultural affairs. Officials in these posts organized local residents to construct irrigation works and promote agriculture and sericulture.

In 1354, Zhang issued the Order to Establish Schools in the Prefectures and Counties (州縣興學校令) to promote education and improve public morals. He argued that social order rested on proper human relationships and that schools were essential to the cultivation of talent. He attributed the unrest of the time to the breakdown of family relationships, which had undermined loyalty to the ruler and eroded traditional moral principles. The order instructed local authorities to select learned and courteous scholars to teach the classics and promote proper social relations and talent cultivation. After moving his capital to Suzhou in 1356, Zhang established a scholarly staff and founded the Hongwen Academy (弘文館). The academy admitted the sons of military officers and civil officials, as well as talented young men from local communities. In 1362, Zhang's regime held a provincial examination in Zhejiang, selecting 32 tribute candidates (gongshi). The examination was criticized for widespread cheating, as reflected in a contemporary satirical essay that lamented the prevalence of examination fraud despite the revival of literary culture.
