= Ming Sheng =

Ming Sheng 明升

Emperor of Ming Xia
- Reign: 1362–1366
- Predecessor: Ming Yuzhen
- Born: 1356
- Died: Unknown
Era dates
- Kaixi (开熙)
- Dynasty: Ming Xia
- Father: Ming Yuzhen
- Mother: née Peng

Ming Sheng (simplified Chinese: 明升; traditional Chinese: 明昇; pinyin: Míng Shēng; b. 1356) was the second emperor of Ming Xia. His father, Ming Yuzhen, was a leader of the Red Turban Rebellions and the founder of Ming Xia, a dynasty located in Sichuan. He was later exiled to Korea, where he was known as Myŏng Sŭng (Korean: 명승).

== Life ==
Ming Sheng's father, Ming Yuzhen, died in 1366. He had possibly been killed by his younger brother, who was in turn killed by Ming Sheng's mother, née Peng. Ming Sheng ascended the throne of Ming Xia in 1366 with his mother as regent. He was proclaimed the "Lesser Lord of Radiance", a title with Manichean associations that was similar to "Lesser Prince of Radiance," which was used by fellow rebel leader Han Lin'er. Because Ming Sheng's father, Ming Yuzhen, was able to maintain unity in the Ming Xia government, the Xia court became divided after Yuzhen's death, making it possible for regional generals to act autonomously. In particular, Xia general Wu Youren of Baoning invaded Chongqing and executed the people who had killed his fellow general Wan Sheng. Despite this internal decay, the Xia government still adhered to Ming Yuzhen's will, which advocated a defensive foreign policy stance. Due to the intra-dynastic nature of Ming Sheng's succession, he greatly emphasized following his father's precedent in order to maintain legitimacy. For example, in an edict made following his succession, Ming Sheng proclaimed: "I follow the example of my ancestor and continue his grand heritage; I will boundlessly expand this great enterprise and promulgate his civil and military achievements everywhere and I pray for a long-lasting Mandate of Heaven." The same edict also alludes to the Duke of Zhou, who acted as regent for King Cheng of Zhou just as Ming's mother acted as regent for himself.

In 1365, Zhu Yuanzhang (the future founder of the Ming Dynasty) sent the governor of Huguang, Yang Jing (Ming dynasty), to Ming Xia with a favorable letter of surrender. Ming Sheng did not reply. In 1367, Zhu had one of Ming Sheng's envoys observe general Xu Da's army in an attempt to intimidate Ming into surrender; this only made the Xia dynasty bolster its defenses. In 1371, during the Ming conquest of Sichuan, Ming Sheng was captured by a combined force under Tang He and Liao Yongzhong and was taken to Nanjing in August. He reached the city in the same month, was made the Marquis returned to righteousness, and lived a comfortable life alongside Chen Li, the son of rebel leader Chen Youliang. However, Ming Sheng and Chen Li became rallying points for people who were discontent with the Ming Dynasty. The Hongwu Emperor (Zhu Yuanzhang) thus sent a letter to King Gongmin of Goryeo saying that he wanted to get rid of "the Emperor [Chen] and the [Xia] Emperor". Hongwu promptly sent Ming and Chen to Korea and King Gongmin accepted.

Ming Sheng married the daughter of Yun Hŭi-chong (윤희종; 尹熙宗), a Goryeo official, in March 1373. He and his family were given farmland and exempted from taxation and corvée labor, as Hongwu had requested.

== Legacy ==
The privileges of Ming Sheng's descendants were confirmed by King Taejo, the founder of Joseon. Ming's descendants in Pyongyang and Yeonju lost their privileges after the 1636 Qing invasion of Joseon. Local Korean officials questioned the legitimacy of the privileges, which were reinstated later in 1636 and finally withdrawn in 1655. His descendants continue to live in Korea.
