= Ni Wenjun =

Chinese general (died 1357)

Ni Wenjun (Chinese: 倪文俊; died 1357) was a rebel leader of the Red Turban Rebellions who fought against the Yuan dynasty in the 1360s.

Ni Wenjun was born in Huangpi to a fishing family; he promoted legends about himself, including the story that a white tiger appeared in his mother's bedchamber at the moment of his birth. He established a regional polity around Hanyang (modern day Wuhan) and invited Xu Shouhui to include Hanyang in the areas under Red Turban control. As an early supporter of the Tianwan cause, he was given the post of chengxiang (prime minister) in the Qishui court.

One of Ni's famous subordinates was Chen Youliang, who later founded the short-lived Chen Han dynasty. Ni Wenjun was later trapped and assassinated by Chen Youliang in 1357, who sought to thwart Ni's intended coup against their commander, Xu Shouhui.
