= Ming Yuzhen =

Emperor of Ming Xia from 1362 to 1366

Ming Yuzhen 明玉珍

Emperor of the Xia state
- Reign: 1362–1366
- Successor: Ming Sheng
- Born: 1329
- Died: 1366 (aged 36–37)
- Burial: Rui Mausoleum (叡陵; in present-day Shangheng Street, Jiangbei District, Chongqing)
Era dates
- Tiantong (天統): 1363–1366
Posthumous name
- Emperor Qinwen Zhaowu (欽文昭武皇帝)
Temple name
- Taizu (太祖)
- Dynasty: Xia

Chinese name
- Chinese: 明玉珍
Transcriptions
Standard Mandarin
- Hanyu Pinyin: Míng Yùzhēn

Ming Yuzhen (1329–1366) was a rebel leader in the Red Turban Rebellion during the final phase of the Yuan dynasty. He was born into a family of landowners and became a general in the rebel Song (Tianwan) state, where he ruled over Sichuan. After the Song regime fell, he declared himself King of Longshu in 1360 and proclaimed himself emperor of the Xia state in 1362. He died four years later. His young son, Ming Sheng, succeeded him as emperor, ruling for five years before the Ming dynasty conquered the Xia state in 1371.

== Biography ==
Ming Yuzhen (Note: In the scholarly literature, it is widely believed that his original name was Min Rui (旻瑞), a view adopted, for example, by William Rowe in Crimson rain: seven centuries of violence in a Chinese county (2007). This information apparently derives from the work Caomuzi, compiled after 1378 by Jie Ziqi. Jie, who resided in Zhejiang, had only secondhand information about Ming Yuzhen, and his work is considered unreliable. Moreover, the surname Min (旻) is not attested for any other individual and appears not to have existed at all.) was born in 1329 (Note: Max Jakob Fölster, in Legitimation of a 'Marginal Dynasty': The Great Xia in Sichuan 1362–1371 – A case study (2013), gives Ming Yuzhen's year of birth as 1329, whereas William Rowe, in Crimson rain: seven centuries of violence in a Chinese county (2007), and other scholars instead give 1331.) in the village of Meiqiu in Sui County (in present-day Hubei Province). He came from a family of landowners. He initially served as an officer in the local militia, holding the position of "commander of local patrolling archers" (xunsi gongbing paizitou, 巡司弓兵牌子頭). When the Red Turban Rebellion broke out, the village council of Meiqiu entrusted Ming with protecting the town. Around 1352, he joined the rebels and quickly rose through the ranks in the "Red Army" of the rebel state of Song (referred to by historians as Tianwan). The Song emperor Xu Shouhui appointed Xu as "Grand Marshal of the Troop Fighting the Barbarians" (tongbing zhenglu da yuanshuai, 統兵征虜大元帥), and Xu served under Ni Wenjun.

In 1357, Ming was tasked with procuring food supplies for the Red Army in Sichuan. He led the Song fleet from Yiling up the Yangtze River and easily captured Chongqing, a strategically important city in southern Sichuan. Chongqing's defenses were weakened by the hostility between the Yuan garrison commander, Yang Han (楊漢), and the Mongolian provincial governor, Öljeitu. Following the capture of Chongqing, Xu Shouhui appointed Ming as governor of Sichuan. Ming initially only controlled a portion of the province and faced ongoing battles against Yuan forces led by Governor Öljeitu and generals Nanggiyatai and Zhao Zi (趙䋷), who were based in Jiading (present-day Leshan) and Chengdu. These conflicts continued until 1360. In addition to fighting the Yuan forces, Ming also had to defend Sichuan against the 1358 invasion from Shaanxi to the north by the "Green Turban Army" under Li Xixi (李喜喜). (Note: The shattered remnants of the Green Turban Army joined Ming Yuzhen's forces. Among them was Fu Youde, who, however, felt undervalued while serving under Ming's son Ming Sheng. In 1360, Fu defected to another rebel ruler, Chen Youliang, and in the following year transferred his allegiance to Zhu Yuanzhang. Under Zhu, Fu finally achieved a distinguished career as a successful general, including his role in the conquest of the Sichuan state ruled by Ming Sheng in 1371.)

While Ming was conquering Sichuan, a power struggle broke out among the leading generals of the Song state. Chen Youliang assassinated Ni Wenjun, whom he claimed was attempting to overthrow Xu Shouhui. Ming warned Xu about Chen, successfully defending Xu against an assassination attempt. Chen declared himself King of Han in 1359 and imprisoned Xu. The following year, he waged war against Zhu Yuanzhang, who controlled a large region of the lower Yangtze River (Jiangnan) from Nanjing. Chen then killed Xu and declared himself emperor, taking control of most of the Song territory. In the midst of this conflict, Chen had previously ordered Ming to send troops on Xu's behalf in the war against Zhu. Ming initially complied, but later recalled the troops upon learning of Xu's murder.

Map of China, including Ming's Xia state, in 1365

Ming ruled Sichuan in an almost independent manner from an early stage, but he remained loyal to Xu. He rejected Chen's usurpation and cut off all ties with him. In 1360, Ming declared himself King of Longshu (隴蜀王, Longshu Wang), (Note: Shu is a designation for Sichuan, while Long is a common abbreviation for Gansu and implied claims to southern Shaanxi.) and two years later he declared himself emperor of the Great Xia under the influence of his most important minister, Liu Zhen (劉楨). Despite not recognizing the legitimacy of Chen's regime, Ming did not engage in hostilities with him. Instead, he attempted to expand his territory to the north and south. In the north, he attacked southern Shaanxi Province, which was then controlled by Yuan general Li Shiqi. Ming successfully occupied Jiezhou (present-day Longnan in southern Gansu) until 1371, but his attack on Hanzhong and other cities in Shaanxi failed. In the south, he attempted to capture Yunnan from Mongol governor Boru Temür in 1363. He launched three waves of attacks, and in the first wave, his minister Wan Sheng (萬勝) managed to capture Zhongqing (present-day Kunming). The Yuan armies quickly regrouped and defeated the Xia army. Ming's remaining troops retreated to Sichuan.

After the defeat in Yunnan, Ming shifted his focus to strengthening and stabilizing his rule over Sichuan. He restructured the government by implementing a system based on the Rites of Zhou, a work on government offices from the Warring States period (c. 475 – 221 BC). In 1363, he introduced a system derived from the Yuan dynasty, with the Central Secretariat and the Bureau of Military Affairs (shumi yuan) as the highest state administration offices. Local administration continued to follow the traditional division into counties (xian), sub-prefectures (zhou), and prefectures (fu). To establish his rule, Ming utilized a combination of folk millenarian symbolism, declaring himself as the "Lord of Light" known as Mingzhu (明主), and also showed support for Confucianism. This strategy allowed him to gain the trust of the people and the support of the gentry.

Ming died at the age of 37 in 1366 due to illness. His nine-year-old son, Ming Sheng, succeeded him on the throne. The ministers Wan Sheng and Dai Shou (戴壽) struggled for control of the child emperor and the state. Dai emerged as the victor while Wan lost his life. In 1367, a regional official named Wu Youren (吳友仁) rose up against Dai, accusing him of murdering Wan. Unable to defeat Wu militarily, Dai made a deal with him and executed Wan's murderer. This resulted in a lack of strong leadership within the Xia government, causing them to passively wait for events to unfold. Eventually, the Ming dynasty, founded by Zhu Yuanzhang in 1368, conquered Sichuan in 1371 without facing any major obstacles.
