= Ming Xia =

Rebel state in China (1363–1371)

Great Xia 大夏
- 1362–1371
- Xia territory in 1365
- Capital: Chongqing
- Government: Monarchy
- Emperor
  - 1362–1366: Ming Yuzhen
  - 1366–1371: Ming Sheng
- History
  - Established: 1362
  - Disestablished: 1371
Preceded by	Succeeded by
Yuan dynasty	Ming dynasty
- Today part of: China

Chinese name
- Traditional Chinese: 明夏
Transcriptions
Standard Mandarin
- Hanyu Pinyin: Míng Xià

Dynastic name
- Chinese: 大夏
Transcriptions
Standard Mandarin
- Hanyu Pinyin: Dà Xià

The Ming Xia, officially the Great Xia, was a short-lived rebel state in China during the Red Turban Rebellion, which occurred in the final phase of the Yuan dynasty. It was established in Sichuan in 1362 by Ming Yuzhen, who had been ruling there since 1357 on behalf of the rebel state of Tianwan. In 1360, Ming Yuzhen declared himself King of Longshu and ruled independently. The state of Xia was conquered by the Ming dynasty in 1371.

== Founding ==
In the early 14th century, several rebellions erupted against the Mongol-led Yuan dynasty in central China. During the 1330s, opposition to Yuan rule grew stronger as various groups of disaffected people united through shared religious and millenarian beliefs influenced by Manichaeism and Buddhism. Known as the Red Turbans, these rebels believed in the coming of the "King of Light" (Mingwang), a messianic figure who would cleanse the world of evil and overthrow the Yuan government. In Hubei, the movement was led by Zou Pusheng (鄒普勝), a blacksmith; Xu Shouhui, a street vendor; and Peng Yingyu (彭瑩玉), a peasant who served as its principal ideologue. In August 1351, Zou Pusheng and Xu Shouhui launched an uprising in eastern Hubei. The following month, they established their headquarters at the newly captured city of Qizhou, the prefectural capital, thereby securing control over northeastern Hubei. They proclaimed the Zhiping ("Equable Governance") era and founded an independent state known as Tianwan. Xu Shouhui was enthroned as emperor, while Zou Pusheng assumed the position of grand marshal. Between 1352 and 1353, Tianwan expanded rapidly, bringing large areas of central China under its control.

In 1357, the Tianwan general Ming Yuzhen led an army of 10,000 men up the Yangtze River and successfully conquered Sichuan. This conquest greatly increased the strength and influence of Tianwan. One of the main motivations for Ming's expedition to Sichuan was the issue of feeding his army in Hubei, where food shortages were prevalent. Despite remaining loyal to Xu Shouhui, Ming effectively governed Sichuan on his own.

In 1360, Chen Youliang overthrew the state of Tianwan and killed Xu Shouhui. Ming Yuzhen refused to recognize the new ruler. He declared himself "Master of Light" (Mingzhu) and took on the title of King of Longshu (隴蜀王). Two years later, in 1362, he became emperor of the Great Xia with its capital in Chongqing. Ming Yuzhen drew upon symbols associated with the millenarian beliefs propagated by the White Lotus movement, including devotion to the Buddha Maitreya and expectations of the coming messianic "King of Light". He also suppressed Taoism and Buddhism and promoted Confucianism, gaining the trust of the people and the support of the gentry. His administration was heavily influenced by the Confucian scholar Liu Zhen, who dominated his rule for the next few years. Ming Yuzhen organized his administration using traditional methods and terminology from the ancient Zhou dynasty (c. 1046 – 256 BC). Despite his successes, he failed in his attempts at expansion. He tried to conquer Yuan province of Yunnan, but the attack was poorly planned and carried out by a small force, resulting in failure.

In 1366, Ming Yuzhen died at the age of 35 due to illness. His nine-year-old son, Ming Sheng, succeeded him as the "Lesser Master of Light" (Xiao Mingzhu). With a child emperor at the helm, the Xia government lacked strong unified leadership and merely passively awaited the conquest of the Ming.

== Fall ==
In 1368, Zhu Yuanzhang, a Red Turban leader who had risen to prominence since 1356 and was based in Nanjing, proclaimed himself emperor and founded the Ming dynasty. After a series of successful campaigns from 1367 to 1370, the Ming established control over the majority of China. However, there were still pockets of resistance from the Mongols in the northwest and Yunnan, as well as the state of Xia in Sichuan. The Ming government shifted its focus towards conquering Sichuan. The state of Xia had previously maintained positive diplomatic relations with the Ming (known as the state of Wu until 1367), dating back to Zhu Yuanzhang's victory over Chen Youliang at the Battle of Lake Poyang in 1363.

In 1370, the Xia court was faced with a difficult decision: whether to reject or accept the Ming's demands for submission. Despite attempts at diplomatic negotiations, peace could not be achieved and in early 1371, the Ming army was mobilized. Fu Youde was given the order to attack Sichuan from the north, with Deng Yu responsible for providing supplies for his troops. At the same time, Tang He's land forces and Liao Yongzhong's fleet advanced from the east up the Yangtze River.

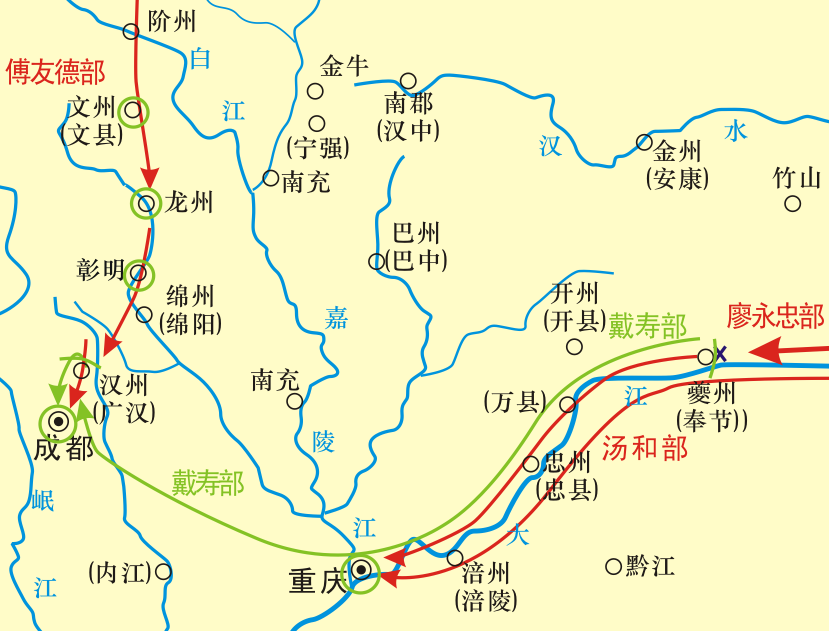
A map showing the Ming conquest of Xia. Red arrows indicate the Ming army's march; yellow-green arrows indicate the Xia army's march.

Tang He and Liao Yongzhong were halted by defenders at Qutang Gorge, located on the border of Sichuan and Hubei. In May 1371, Fu Youte took control of Wenzhou (present-day Wenxian in Gansu) and then proceeded to capture Mianzhou (130 km northeast of Chengdu) in a night battle. After several weeks of preparation, Fu Youte and his troops crossed the Luo River, the final barrier before reaching Chengdu. In an effort to fortify the defense of Chengdu, the defenders relocated an army from the border with Hubei to the Yangtze and Luo rivers, but this army was ultimately defeated in July 1371.

Withdrawing some of their troops from Qutang Gorge and utilizing their artillery superiority, Tang He and Liao Yongzhong were able to advance along the Yangtze River without encountering any major obstacles. By August, they had reached Chongqing, and the fifteen-year-old emperor Ming Sheng and his mother surrendered. In September, the defenders of Chengdu also surrendered.

After the conquest of Sichuan, the young emperor was given an honorary title and taken to Nanjing. In 1372, he was sent to Korea. During his time there, he lived a comfortable life and his descendants were exempt from taxes until the mid-17th century. The Ming government's fear of keeping Ming Sheng in China was justified, as evidenced by the 1475 Miao rebellion in Guizhou, where the leader claimed to be a descendant of Ming Yuzhen.

== Sources and assessment ==
Historians have three main sources for the state of Xia: the relevant sections in the Ming Taizu Shilu, or "Veritable Records of Emperor Taizu of Ming"; the history of the Ming family, who ruled in the state of Xia, compiled by the scholar Yang Xueke; and the inscription on the stele found in the tomb of Ming Yuzhen. The Ming Taizu Shilu was compiled by Ming court historians and revised several times during the reign of the Yongle Emperor (r. 1402–1424), providing the official Ming perspective on history. Yang Xueke, a native of Sichuan who lived in the Xia state, compiled his work Mingshi Shilu (明氏實錄; 'Annals of Ming Family') according to the model of official histories. He had access to the state archive of the Xia state, allowing him to quote from its official documents. The inscription on the stele in the tomb of Ming Yuzhen was discovered in 1982 during construction work in Chongqing. The stele measures 134 × 57 × 23.5 cm, and the inscription—the biography of Ming Yuzhen—contains 1004 characters in 24 columns, compiled by Liu Zhen, Ming Yuzhen's chief advisor.

Classical Chinese historians viewed the state of Xia as an illegitimate state in Chinese history, with rulers who were deemed incompetent and ultimately overthrown. In the People's Republic of China, Ming Yuzhen was initially condemned as a member of the landlord class. However, after the Cultural Revolution, the concept of the state of Xia as a "revolutionary peasant regime" (農民革命政權; nongmin geming zhengquan) gained popularity in the 1970s. Interest in Ming Yuzhen and his state was revived in China following the discovery of his tomb. Western historians have largely overlooked the state, with their most extensive work on it being the Ming Yuzhen entry in the Dictionary of Ming Biography from 1976.
