= Li Siqi (warlord) =

Yuan Dynasty warlord

Li Siqi (simplified Chinese: 李思齐; traditional Chinese: 李思齊; pinyin: Lǐsīqí; 1323－1374) was a leader in the late Yuan dynasty of China. He controlled Shaanxi and surrendered to the Hongwu Emperor in 1369.

== Life ==
Li Siqi was born in Luoshan in southern Henan. His friend and mentor, Chaghan Temur, became the dominant Yuan leader in northern China after General Toqto'a was fired by the Yuan court in January 1355. The two generals operated under the guidance of Dash Badalugh, the chief Yuan militia organizer in Henan, until a Red Turban invasion captured Kaifeng in 1357. Li and Chaghan accepted the Yuan government's assignment to drive the rebels out of Shaanxi and were rewarded with high titles for their success; they used the prestige to establish a power base in the province. While Chaghan consolidated his control over Henan and southern Shanxi, Li remained in Shaanxi. After Chaghan Temur was murdered in July 1362 while besieging Yidu, the Yuan government ordered Li Siqi (and other followers of Chagan) to obey his son, Köke Temür; Li refused. He joined forces with Bolad Temür's former supporters to oppose Köke, hampering Köke's attempts to suppress the Red Turbans in southern China.

== Downfall ==
Zhu Yuanzhang, the soon-to-be founder of the Ming Dynasty, launched a northern expedition to unify China in November 1367. In early 1369, generals Xu Da, Chang Yuchun, and Feng Sheng were sent to conquer Xi'an. Li initially ignored Zhu's request to abandon the Yuan Dynasty. After Xi'an fell to Ming forces, Li fled to Fengxiang, then to Lintao. He surrendered to Feng Sheng in May.
