= Xu Shouhui =

Xu Shouhui 徐壽輝

Emperor of Tianwan
- Reign: 1351–1360
- Born: 1320; Yuan Yanyou 7 (元延祐七年); Shangwubao, Duoyun Township, Luotian County, Henan Jiangbei Province
- Died: 1360 (aged 39–40); Tianwan Tianding 2 (天完天定二年); Yuan Zhizheng 20 (元至正二十年); Caishi, Taiping Lu, Jiangzhe Province
Names
- Xu Shouhui (徐壽輝)
Era dates
- Zhiping (治平): 1351–1355; Taiping (太平): 1356–1358; Tianqi (天啟): 1358–1359; Tianding (天定): 1359–1360
Posthumous name
- Emperor Yingtian Qiyun Xianwu (應天啟運獻武皇帝) (conferred by Ming Yuzhen)
Temple name
- Shizong (世宗) (conferred by Ming Yuzhen)
- Dynasty: Song (Tianwan)

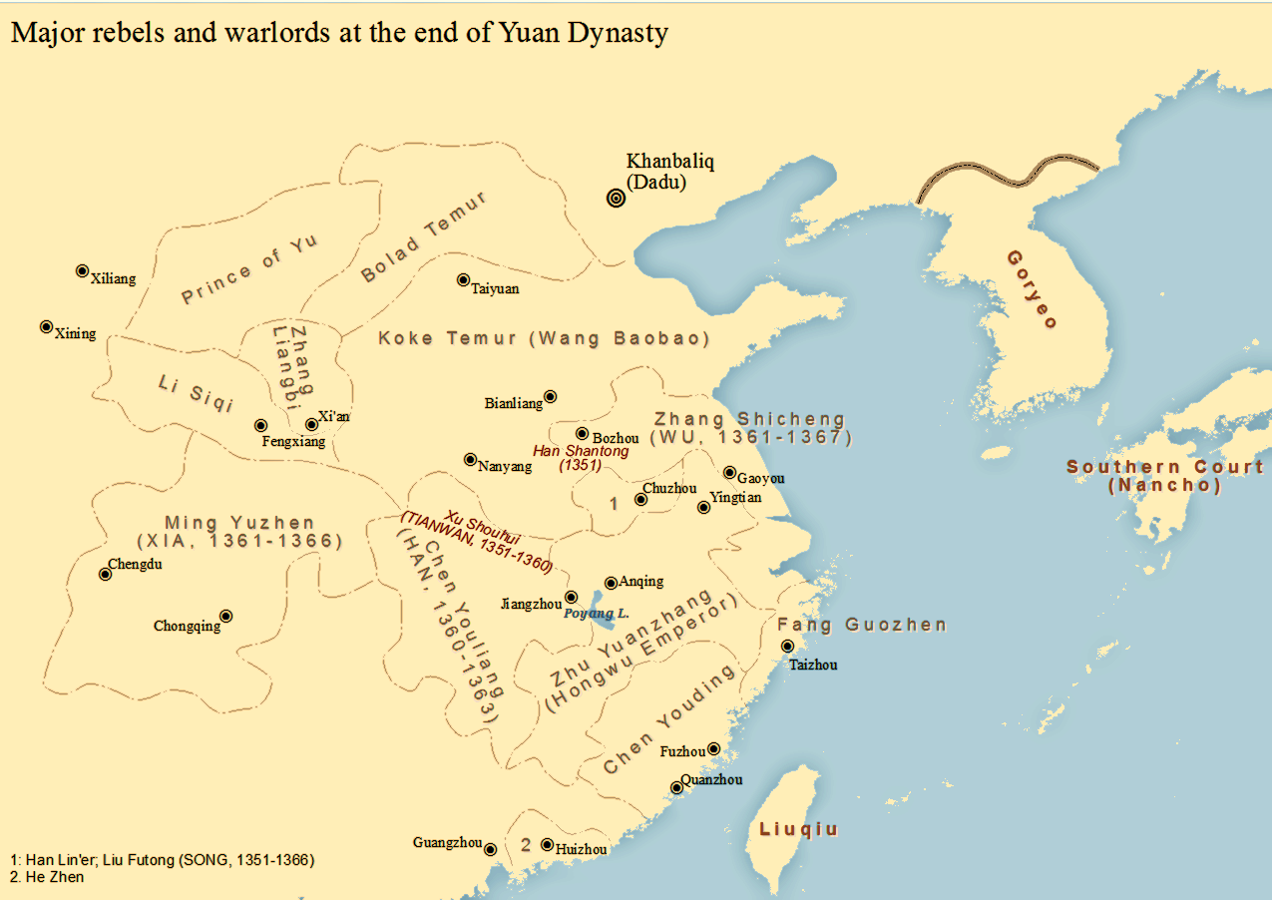
Rebels and warlords at the end of Yuan Dynasty, including the location of Xu Shouhui's force.

Xu Shouhui (simplified Chinese: 徐寿辉; traditional Chinese: 徐壽輝; pinyin: Xú Shòuhuī; Wade–Giles: Hsü Shou-hui) (1320–1360) was a 14th-century Chinese rebel leader who proclaimed himself emperor of the Tianwan (天完) dynasty during the late Yuan dynasty period of China. He was also known as Xu Zhenyi (徐真一 or 徐真逸, romanized in Wade–Giles as Hsü Chen-i).

Born in Luotian (羅田, now in Hubei), Xu was a cloth vendor by profession.

== Emperor ==
In August 1351, he worked with others in Qízhōu (蘄州) to establish the rebel army of Red Turbans under the pretense of the Buddhist White Lotus Society. In the following months of the Red Turban Rebellion, they captured Qishui (蘄水) and made it the command centre of the Red Turbans and the capital of the newly declared Empire of Tianwan (天完), originally called Song (宋) with himself as the emperor with the era name of "Zhiping" (治平).

The number of his supporters increased rapidly as he claimed to be Maitreya Buddha (彌勒佛下生) who sought to "destroy the rich to benefit the poor" (摧富益貧). In 1352, he invaded more of Hebei, and moved on to take Jiangxi, Anhui, Fujian, Zhejiang, Jiangsu, and Hunan.

After being temporarily defeated by the army of the Yuan dynasty, he fled to Huangmei Mountain (黃梅山), but returned in 1355 to invade once again and move the capital to Hanyang District.

In 1358, after Chen Youliang took control of the city Longxing (now Nanchang 南昌市), Xu Shouhui wanted to move the capital from Hanyang to Longxing. Chen Youliang opposed this idea, as Longxing was not far from Jiangzhou, which would make Xu Shouhui a threat to him. However, Xu Shouhui insisted on the relocation, and in December of 1359 ordered his troops to sail down the Yangtze River to Jiangzhou. Anticipating this, Chen Youliang ordered his men to lay an ambush to the city. Once Xu Shouhui arrived, he and his men fell ambush and Chen Youliang detained him, killing the rest of his men before proclaiming himself King of the State of Han. Xu Shouhui would die shortly in 1360 in Chen Youliang's captivity, however, it is not known if he was executed or died from an illness.

== See also ==
- Red Turban Rebellion
