= Battle of Lake Poyang =

1363 naval battle of the Red Turban Rebellion

- Part of Red Turban Rebellion
Date	30 August – 4 October 1363
Location	Lake Poyang, Jiujiang, China
Result	Ming victory
Territorial changes	Zhu Yuanzhang gained control over the Yangzi River valley

Belligerents
Chen Han	Western Wu

Commanders and leaders
Chen Youliang †	Zhu Yuanzhang

Strength
Over 100 vessels; 650,000 men	200,000 men

Casualties and losses
Chen Youliang and most of his army	1,346 dead; 11,347 wounded

The Battle of Lake Poyang (Chinese: 鄱陽湖之戰; pinyin: Póyáng Hú Zhīzhàn) was a naval battle which took place (30 August – 4 October 1363) (Note: For those cross-referencing the History of Ming, in the old Chinese calendar 至正二十三年 refers to the year 1363 CE, 七月二十日 refers to 8月29日 or 29 August, and 八月二十六日 refers to 10月4日 or 4 October.) between the rebel forces of Zhu Yuanzhang and Chen Youliang during the Red Turban Rebellion which led to the fall of the Yuan dynasty. Chen Youliang besieged Nanchang with a large fleet on Lake Poyang, one of China's largest freshwater lakes, and Zhu Yuanzhang met his force with a smaller fleet. After an inconclusive engagement exchanging fire, Zhu employed fire ships to burn the enemy tower ships and destroyed their fleet. This was the last major battle of the rebellion before the rise of the Ming dynasty.

== Background ==
On 30 August 1363, the forces of Chen Han conducted a major amphibious assault on Nanchang but failed to take it due to the defenders' use of cannons and suffered significant losses. The town of Nanchang was strategically located to guard Lake Poyang, which connected the Yangzi with other river basins. During the early 1360s, Zhu Yuanzhang held key garrisons on the lake and administered them from Nanjing 560 kilometers downriver. In 1362, Chen Youliang used "tower ships" to transport his troops to Nanchang. They could not disembark on the city walls like they did at other cities because the wall was no longer on the shore. Chen personally led an assault on the city gates. They were repelled with a barrage of cannon fire and driven back. After this failure, Chen set up a blockade, determined to starve out the defenders, but a small fishing boat managed to slip out and reached Nanjing in time to warn Zhu Yuanzhang.

== Battle ==
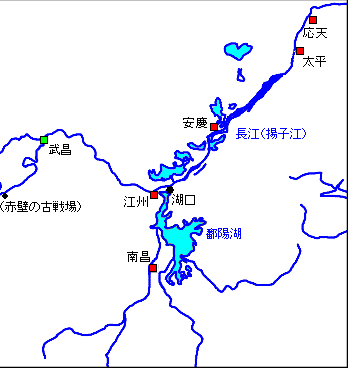

Zhu Yuanzhang's fleet arrived at Hukou on 24 August and relieved Nanchang on the 28th. Chen Youliang embarked his forces and sailed north into Lake Poyang. The two fleets met on 29 August. Zhu's forces numbered only a third the size of Chen's army. According to one Ming source, Zhu's forces arrived armed with "fire bombs, fire guns, fire arrows, fire seeds [probably grenades], large and small fire lances, large and small 'commander' fire-tubes, large and small iron bombs, rockets". This shows that older gunpowder weapons co-existed alongside guns, and proto-guns such as fire lances were not supplanted until after the early Ming. A new weapon called the "No Alternative" was also mentioned. The No Alternative was "made from a circular reed mat about five inches around and seven feet long that was pasted over with red paper and bound together with silk and hemp—stuffed inside it was gunpowder twisted in with bullets and all kinds of [subsidiary] gunpowder weapons". It was hung from a pole on the foremast, and when an enemy ship came into close range, the fuse was lit, and the weapon would supposedly fall onto the enemy ship, at which point things inside shot out "and burned everything to bits, with no hope of salvation".

On 30 August, Zhu deployed his fleet in 11 squadrons with orders to "get close to the enemy's ships and first set off gunpowder weapons (發火器), then bows and crossbows, and finally attack their ships with short-range weapons". Fire bombs were hurled using naval trebuchets, and Zhu's forces succeeded in "burning twenty or more enemy vessels and killing or drowning many enemy troops". Still, their flagship also caught fire and hit a sandbar. Chen's warships drove back the opposing line until they fell back to a shallow area where they could not be pursued. Zhu tried again to engage with Chen's fleet in ship-to-ship combat and was driven back once more with severe losses. The next day, the wind shifted toward Chen's forces, and Zhu sent burning ships into the opposing fleet, destroying several hundred vessels. While guns were used during the battle, ultimately, they were not pivotal to success, and the battle was won using incendiary weapons.

On 2 September, the two fleets engaged in battle again. Though still outnumbered, Zhu's forces were able to isolate and destroy larger enemy warships, forcing them to withdraw. Afterward, Zhu's fleet settled into a blockade for another month before Chen decided to attempt a breakout on 4 October. Zhu was ready with fire ships set adrift, scattering Chen's ships so that clusters of ships engaged in combat far from each other. Chen was killed when an arrow struck his head.

== Aftermath ==
Chen Youliang was succeeded by his son, Chen Li, who surrendered to Zhu in 1364.

The Western Wu victory cemented their position as the leading rebel group. The Western Wu would overthrow the Yuan five years later and command China. Zhu Yuanzhang then became the first emperor of the Ming dynasty as the Hongwu Emperor.

== See also ==
- Red Turban Rebellions
- Ming campaign against the Uriankhai
- Battle of Buir Lake
