= Yangsan Jin clan =

Korean clan from Hubei, China

- Country: Korea
- Current region: Korea
- Founder: Chen Pucai ( ja:陳普才 )

Yangsan Jin clan (Korean: 양산 진씨; Hanja: 梁山 陳氏) is one of the Korean clans, founded around the Yuan dynasty. Their founder was Chen Pucai (陳普才) who was originally from Huangpengshan (黄蓬山), Yusha County, Mianyang Prefecture, present-day Honghu, Hubei.

== Founder Chen Pucai ==
Chen was a fisherman from Huangpengshan (黄蓬山), Yusha County, today part of Honghu, an area with many lakes which was historically known for its bounty of fish. Chen Pucai was later conferred high titles and income by the Ming.

Chen Pucai had a son named Chen Youliang, who fought against the Yuan Dynasty and became the founder and first emperor of the Chen Han.

The younger son of Chen Youliang named Chen Li, succeeded as second emperor of Chen Han.

After surrender to Ming dynasty, Emperor Hongwu appointed Chen Li as Marquis of Guide. He was later sent to Korea, where he became known as King Chen. King Gongmin gave nine bamboo cloths (苎布) to Chen Li. Chen Li died due to illness but is survived by his descendants in Korea and the Yangsan Jin Clan. One of Chen Li's (known) sons was Chen Mingshan (陈明善).

== See also ==
- Chen Han, origin of the clan and dynasty in China
- Korean clan names
