= Chen Li (emperor) =

Second Emperor of Chen Han

Chen Li 陳理

Emperor of Chen Han
- Reign: 1363–1364
- Predecessor: Chen Youliang
- Born: 1351
- Died: 1408 (aged 56–57); Korea
Names
- Chen Li (陳理)
Era name and dates
- Deshou (德壽): 1363–1364
- Dynasty: Chen Han
- Father: Chen Youliang

Chen Li (simplified Chinese: 陈理; traditional Chinese: 陳理; 1351–1408) was the second and the last emperor of the Chinese Chen Han dynasty. He reigned from 1363 to 1364.

== Biography ==
Chen Li was born in Yusha County, Mianyang (沔阳), now Honghu, Hubei, as the second son of Chen Youliang, the first emperor of the Chen Han during the Yuan-Ming transition. His brother, Chen Shan (陈善), was a crown prince who joined the Ming army.

In 1363, his father, Chen Youliang, was shot by an arrow in the Battle of Poyang Lake. His brother, Chen Shan, fled to the Ming. Later, Zhang Dingbian (张定边) and other top generals protected Chen Li and his descendants, escorting Chen to Wuchang, where Chen succeeded the throne and changed era name to Deshou (德寿). In the winter of the same year, Zhu Yuanzhang personally visited Wuchang.

Chen Youliang's father, Chen Pucai, was named Marquess of Cheng'en (承恩侯), his eldest brother, Chen Youfu (陈友富), was named Earl of Guiren (归仁伯), and his second brother, Chen Youzhi, was named Earl of Huai'en (怀恩伯). He posthumously presented his fourth brother, Chen Youren (陈友仁), as King of Kangshan (康山王), and ordered the relevant officials to set up a temple to offer sacrifices, and his fifth brother, Chen Yougui (陈友贵), was in charge of sacrifices.

In 1364, he surrendered to Zhu Yuanzhang of Wu, the future first emperor of the Ming Dynasty. Zhu then appointed him Marquis of Gui'de (归德侯). Chen was later sent to Korea, where he became known as King Chen. In Korea, Chen settled down and had children, starting the Yangsan Jin Clan (see below).

== Descendants ==
Some of Chen Li's descendants after the Chen Han and Ming have the surname Cheng (程).

=== Yangsan Jin clan ===
According to Korean and Chinese historical sources, in 1372, he migrated to Goryeo and had offspring, starting the Yangsan Jin clan. One of his known sons was Chen Mingshan (陈明善).

On 19 May 1372, Chen Li and Ming Sheng (明升) arrived in Korea with a group of 27 people, who were received by the King of Korea. At that time, Chen Li was 22 years old.

After Chen Li arrived in Korea, he was called Chen Wang (陈王) or King Chen. On 6 June, King Gongmin (恭愍王) gave Chen Li nine bamboo cloths (苎布). Chen was also given some land, a wife, housemaid, and food. During this time he had children, including Chen Mingshan. Chen Li died due to illness but is survived by his descendants in Korea and the Yangsan Jin Clan.

== See also ==
- Yangsan Jin clan (Chen's descendants in Korea)
- Ming Yuzhen
- Yeonan Myeong clan
- Seochok Myeong clan
