= Chen Youliang =

Founder and first emperor of Chen Han (r. 1360–63)

Chen Youliang 陳友諒

Emperor of Chen Han
- Reign: 1360–1363
- Successor: Chen Li
- Born: 1320; Huangpeng, Yusha County, Mianyang Prefecture, now Honghu, Hubei
- Died: 3 October 1363 (aged 42–43); Lake Poyang, Jiangxi
- Burial: Tomb of Chen Youliang
Names
- Chen Youliang (陳友諒)
Era name and dates
- Dayi (大義): 1360–1363
- Dynasty: Chen Han
- Father: Chen Pucai
- Mother: Lady Wu

Chen Youliang
- Traditional Chinese: 陳友諒
- Simplified Chinese: 陈友谅
Transcriptions
Standard Mandarin
- Hanyu Pinyin: Chén Yǒuliàng
- Wade–Giles: Ch'en Yu-liang

Chen Youliang (陳友諒; 1320 – 3 October 1363) was the founder and first emperor of the dynastic state of Chen Han in Chinese history. He was one of the military leaders and heroes of the peasant rebellions at the end of the Yuan dynasty.

== Biography ==
Chen was born to a fishing family in the village of Huangpengshan (黄蓬山), (Note: He is described in modern literature as a native of Honghu, specifically from Longchuanji (龙船矶), Huangpengshan (黄蓬山), Wulin (乌林), also formerly within Yusha County, or more generally as a native of Mianyang. The Veritable Records of Emperor Taizu reports he was from Yusha County, Mianyang, without specifying the exact town or village. Tong Chengxu in his Ping Han Lu (平漢錄) reports that his father, Pucai, was from Huangpeng, while the Ming Dynasty Mianyang Prefecture Gazetteer reports that Chen Youliang was a fisherman from Huangpeng. Qian Qianyi in his Guochu Qunxiong Shilue (國初群雄事略) reports that Pucai was the son of a fisherman from Huangpeng, while the late Qing Dynasty New History of Yuan reports that Chen Youliang was from Huangpeng.) present-day Honghu, in Yusha County (玉沙縣), part of Mianyang Prefecture (沔陽). During the Song Dynasty, Yusha was renowned as the "land of fish and rice", and was visited by poets Lu You and Fan Chengda, who both praised its bounty of fish and its cattle. Some say he was born with the surname Chen (陳), while others say he was born with surname Xie (謝).

In his childhood he grew up poor in his family of relatively unsuccessful fishermen. Chen once served as a district official before becoming a general under Ni Wenjun during the Red Turban Rebellion. Ni Wenjun planned to assassinate Xu Shouhui, the Red Turban rebels' leader, but Chen Youliang killed Ni Wenjun before Ni could kill Xu. Thereupon Chen Youliang went on to capture Anqing and then proceeded to conquer vast parts of Fujian and Jiangxi. After discord was sowed between Chen and his general Zhao Pusheng (趙普勝) by a former retainer of Zhao, bribed and sent to Chen by Zhu Yuanzhang, and with rumors that Zhao wanted to deflect to Wu circulating, Chen decided to do away with his general. By the end of the same year proclaimed himself "King of Han". In the Spring of 1360 Chen declared himself emperor. His era name, as well as his empire's name, was Da Han (literally "Great Han"). Chen Youliang appointed Zou Pusheng (邹普胜) as Grand Preceptor and Zhang Bixian (張必先) as prime minister (丞相).

From 1359 to 1363 Chen's fleet was the strongest on the upper Yangtze River. His power was at least as great as that of another rebel state, Wu, led by Zhu Yuanzhang, founder of the Ming dynasty.

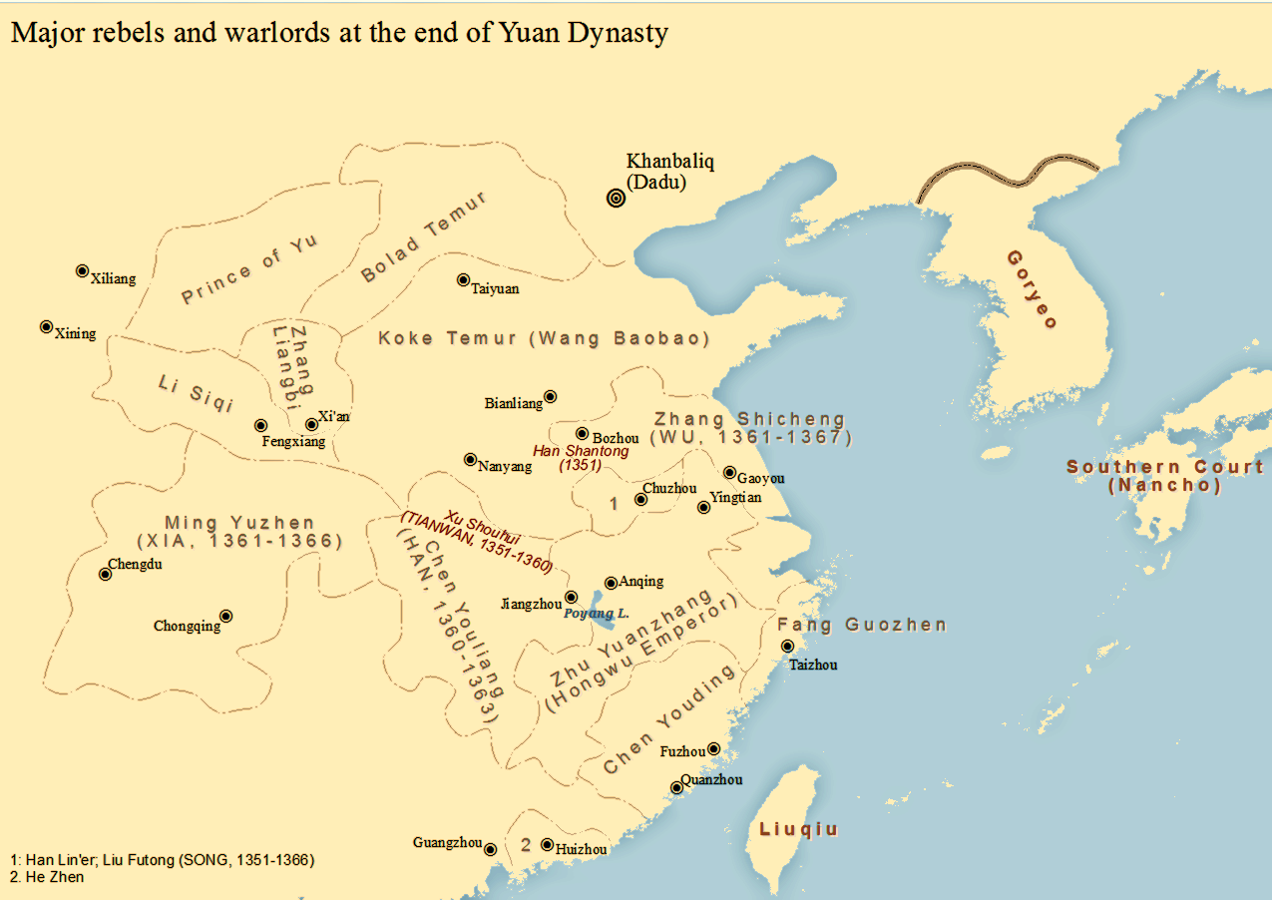
Rebels and warlords at the end of Yuan dynasty, including the territory controlled by Chen Youliang in early 1363

Since 1360 the Han were involved in a long war against Wu, which would be renamed "Ming" in 1368. The war culminated in the decisive Battle of Lake Poyang where the Wu fleet narrowly defeated the larger fleet of Han after three days of fighting.

The Wu fleet then settled into a blockade. A month later, Chen attempted to break out of the blockade. During the resulting ship battle Chen was killed by an arrow that struck his head.

As his crown prince Chen Shan (陳善) had been captured, Chen Youliang was succeeded by his second son, Chen Li, who had managed to escape to Wuchang with Zhang Dingbian (张定边). His son resisted a siege of Wuchang for two months in late 1363. He surrendered when Wu's army once again approached Wuchang in March 1364. Many prefectural commanders surrendered to Wu without a fight, but in Hubei, Hunan, and Jiangxi fighting continued until April 1365. Chen Youliang's son, father and brothers were however granted high titles and incomes by the Ming after Chen Han's fall. After a conflict with members of Zhu Yuanzhang's entourage in 1372, however, the Ming sent Chen Li to Goryeo.

=== Controversial relationship with Trần Ích Tắc ===
The Vietnamese historical annals Đại Việt sử ký toàn thư, compiled more than a century after Chen's death (1469–1479) claims that Chen sent a diplomatic delegate to Đại Việt to mobilise support from Đại Việt, claiming to be the son of Trần Ích Tắc (known in China as Chen Yiji, 陳益稷), a Trần dynasty prince and son of emperor Trần Thái Tông, 66 years older than Chen, who did settle in the Yuan dynasty. Chinese history annals did not record any such relationship, including the Veritable Records of Emperor Taizu, revised for the first time in 1399 by Dong Lun (董倫) and published under the supervision of Yao Guangxiao, both contemporaries of Chen. The Taizu Shilu also specifies that his family had been fishermen for generations, and even reports an exchange between Chen and his father, in which the latter reminds his son that he is "just a fisherman" and advises him to "go back to his former occupation". (Note: When Youliang first rose to power, his father was greatly alarmed and said, "You are just a fisherman, yet you dare to dream of great things. I do not wish for you to do so. Why not continue your old profession?" Youliang replied, "A diviner once examined the burial site of my ancestors and said that I would become rich and noble. Now is the time." When he gained some power, he sent someone to fetch his father. His father said, "You did not heed my advice and started this whole affair. I'm afraid it won't continue." (友谅之初起也，其父甚恐曰：「汝一捕鱼儿，欲图大事，吾不愿也，何不守汝故业？」友谅答曰：「昔有术者观先世葬地，谓我后当富贵，今正其时。」及稍贵，遣人迎其父，父曰：「汝不听吾言而起事至此，吾惧不能勉。」), from The Veritable Records of Emperor Taizu) Chen's fellow Mianyang native, scholar Tong Chengxu (童承敍), adds in his Ping Han Lu (平漢錄) that Chen Youliang's ancestors originally had the family name as "Xiè", with his grandfather, Qianyi, later marrying into a certain Chen family and adopting their family name. This passage was also repeated by Qian Qianyi in his Guochu Qunxiong Shilue (國初群雄事略). The reason why Chen Youliang pretended to be a Vietnamese royal family was probably to earn support from Đại Việt.

The Trần dynasty, however, did not to respond to Chen's request. Trần Ích Tắc was considered a traitor and was legally removed from the Trần royal family. It would in fact have been difficult for Đại Việt to ally with a traitor's descendant. Đại Việt also had no reason to intervene into the affairs of her northern neighbor.

== Family ==
- Grand-ancestors: Chen Qianyi (陳千一)
- Father: Chen Pucai (陳普才) would be promoted to the tile Marquis of Cheng'en (承恩侯) by Zhu Yuanzhang after the downfall of Han
- Mother: surnamed Wu (吴氏)
- Brothers:
  - Chen Youfu (陳友富) would be promoted to the title Marquis of Guiren (歸仁伯) by Zhu Yuanzhang
  - Chen Youzhi (陳友直) would be promoted to the title Marquis of Huaien (懷恩伯) by Zhu Yuanzhang
  - Chen Youren (陳友仁), KIA at the Battle of Poyang Lake
  - Chen Yougui (陳友貴), KIA at the Battle of Poyang Lake
- Spouses: Chen Youliang had several concubines respectively surnamed Yang (楊), Lou (婁), Tao (陶) and Du (闍). Consort Du was captured along with Chen Shan. Concubines Yang and Lou predeceased Chen Youliang
- Children:
  - Chen Shan (陳善), Crown Prince, joined Ming army
  - Chen Li, his successor, started Yangsan Jin clan of Korea
- Grandchildren
  - Chen Mingshan (陈明善), a descendant in Korea

== Legacy ==
Because of his rebellion against the Yuan Dynasty and establishment of the Chen Han Dynasty, Chen Youliang is remembered as a revolutionary, even hero, who helped resist Yuan rule and pave the way for the succeeding Ming dynasty. Historian Wu Han, for instance, described him as a "a hero who opposed the rule of the Mongolian and Han landlord classes". (Note: Zhu Yuanzhang: "Youliang is arrogant, while Shicheng is narrow-minded. The arrogant are prone to conflicts, while the narrow-minded lack far-sighted plans.; Yang Jing: "In the past Chen and Zhang occupied the Wu and Chu regions, built boats to plug rivers, accumulated grain to cross mountains, built their armies and called themselves invincible. However, after the battle in Poyang, Youliang was killed, and Chen turned his army toward the east, while Zhang surrendered. This is not man's choice; it is in fact destiny."; Historian Wu Han: "Although Chen Youliang failed, he was, after all, a hero who opposed the rule of the Mongolian and Han landlord classes in the Yuan dynasty. He played a role in history. At that time, people sympathized with him and missed him. His grave is still preserved under the newly built Yangzi River Bridge for visitors to mourn.")

=== Tomb Memorial ===
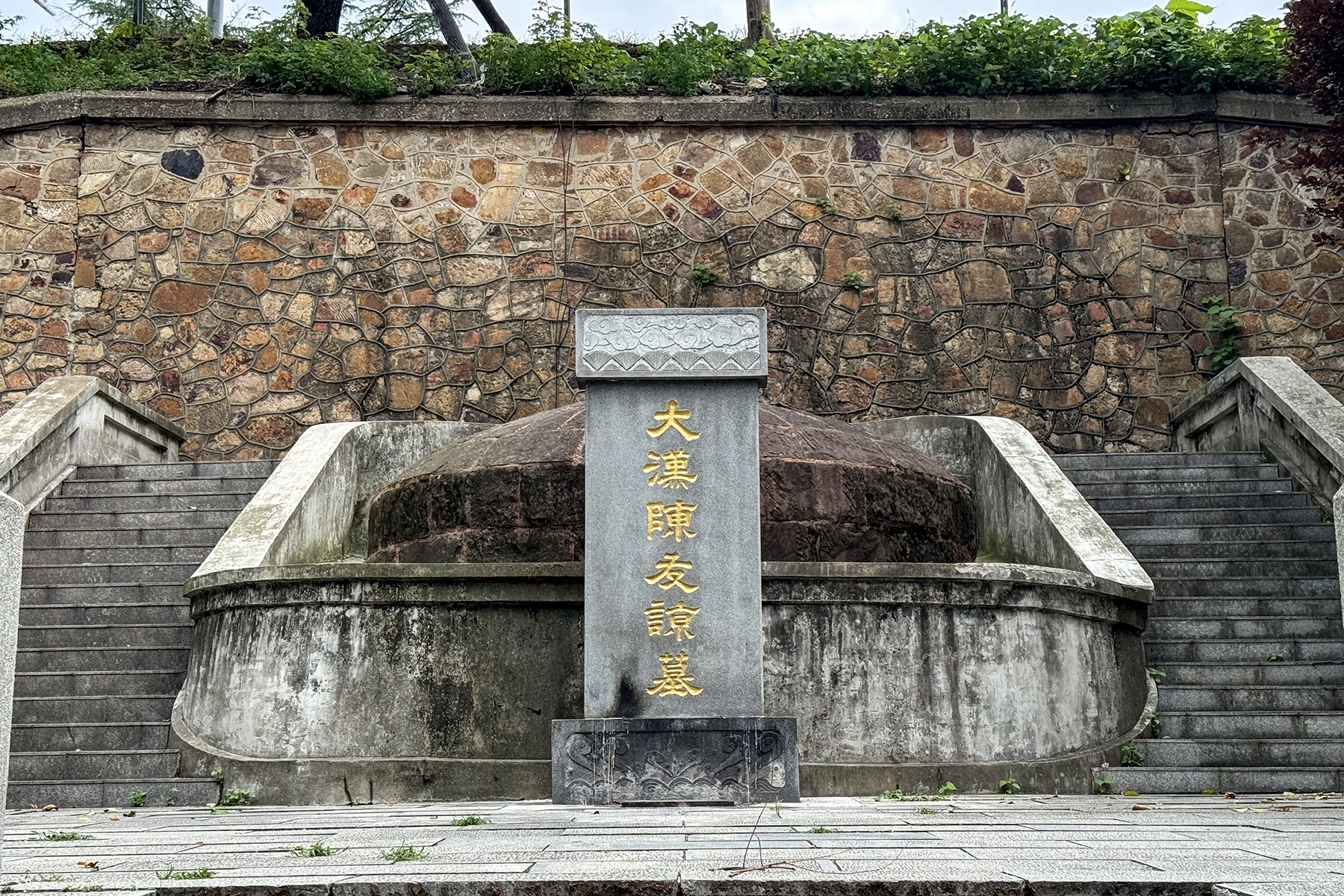
Tomb of Chen Youliang in Wuchang, Wuhan

After Chen's death at the Battle of Poyang Lake, he was buried in the southern slope of Sheshan, near the Wuchang Bridge Head (武昌橋頭) of Yangtze River Bridge in present-day Wuhan City, Hubei Province (next to the Yellow Crane Tower, a famous scenic spot in Wuhan, Hubei Province). Zhu Yuanzhang is said to have visited the tomb the following year to pay his respects, and inscribed the words "Human Retribution, Heaven's Will" on a stone tablet erected near the tomb.

The tomb is circular and surrounded by a brick wall, with a path leading to the tomb of 16 steps. It was built against the mountain and it fratures an hexagonal pavilion. There is a tombstone inscribed with Chen's name in front of the tomb, and in front of the sixteen-step path leading to the tomb there is a tall granite archway with four pillars and three gates, inscribed with the words: "Heroic Figure of Jianghan" (Jiang Han Xian Ying, 江漢先英) on the front and "Heroic Spirit of the Three Chu Regions" (San Chu Xiongfeng, 三楚雄風) on the back. The tomb complex is surrounded by pines and cypresses. There is also a memorial hall dedicated to Chen in Xiantao, Hubei. In Miancheng there is a building which is said to have been Chen's temporary palace. He is also said to have established a temporary palace in his native Huangpengshan, This palace was called Yamen (衙门) by locals. Today only its ruins remain. In Huangpengshan he also built a grand stone paved road, "Hua Street" (华街), today known as the "Ming and Qing Dynasty Bluestone Ancient Street" (明清青石板古街). Chen also built two other streets in Huangpeng, which formed a sizable market square, which are no longer extant. Hua Street, however, has been preserved to this day. In Youlong Mountain (游龙山), Huangpeng, there is an ancient tomb said to be the tomb of Chen Qianyi, grandfather of Chen Youliang.

== Legends ==
Yuan Mei's What the Master Would Not Discuss includes an article titled Destroying the Temple of Chen Youliang, which recounts the anecdote of Zhao Xili (赵锡礼), a county magistrate during the Qing Dynasty, who destroyed the Chen Youliang Temple in Jingzhou and converted it to worship Guan Yu. Zhao only knew it was an unknown prince's temple and considered it an illicit shrine, thus destroying it. He was unaware that the temple was dedicated to Chen Youliang until he inquired with Zhang Tianshi (张天师).

== Cultural portrayals ==
=== Film and TV ===
- 1978 Heavenly Sword and Dragon Slaying Sabre by Tinson Lung Tin Sang
- 1984 Heavenly Sword and Dragon Slaying Sabre by Lü Yao-hua (呂耀華)
- 1986 New Heavenly Sword and Dragon Sabre by Gary Ho Kwai-Lam
- 1987 Born to Be a King by Sean Lau
- 1993 Zhu Yuanzhang (朱元璋) by Lü Qi (吕齐)
- 1994 Heavenly Sword and Dragon Slaying Sabre by Cheng Ping-chun
- 1998 乞丐皇帝傳奇 by Lee Chih-Hsi
- 2000 The Heaven Sword and Dragon Saber by Samuel Yau Man Shing
- 2001 The Heaven Sword and Dragon Saber by Chen Rongjun (陈荣峻)
- 2003 The Heaven Sword and Dragon Saber by Sun Bin (孫斌)
- 2004 Wudang (武当) by Liu Xu (刘旭)
- 2006 Chuanqi Huangdi Zhu Yuanzhang by Li Qing-Xiang
- 2006 Zhu Yuanzhang (朱元璋) by 李明
- 2009 The Heaven Sword and Dragon Saber by Zhou Xiaobin (周晓滨)
- 2016 Zhenmian Tianzi (真命天子) by Ji Xiaobing
- 2015 The Legend of Beggar King and Big Foot Queen by Ji Chen (季晨)
- 2019 Heavenly Sword and Dragon Slaying Sabre by Hou Ruixiang (侯瑞祥)

=== Novels ===
Chen Youliang features as a character in the wuxia novel The Heaven Sword and Dragon Saber by Louis Cha.

== See also ==
- Chen Han
- Chen Li (emperor)

== Sources ==
- Dreyer, Edward. (1982). Early Ming China: A Political History. Stanford: Stanford University Press. ISBN 0-8047-1105-4.
- The Cambridge History of China Volume 7, pp. 65–89 (this section was written by Dreyer)
- Ngô Sĩ Liên (1993), Đại Việt sử ký toàn thư (in Vietnamese) (Nội các quan bản ed.), Hanoi: Social Science Publishing House
