= Second encirclement campaign against the Honghu Soviet =

1931 military campaign

- Part of Chinese Civil War
Date	March 1, 1931 – early June, 1931
Location	Honghu, China
Result	Communist victory

Belligerents
Nationalist China	Chinese Red Army

Commanders and leaders
Xu Yuanquan	Zhou Yiqun; Duan Dechang

Strength
>22,000	5,000

Casualties and losses
>4,000	Light

The second encirclement campaign against the Honghu Soviet was an encirclement campaign launched by the Chinese Nationalist Government that was intended to destroy the Chinese Communist Party's Honghu Soviet and its Chinese Red Army. The Red Army successfully defended their soviet republic against Nationalist attacks from 1 March 1931 to early June 1931.

== Prelude ==
After their defeat in the first encirclement campaign against the Honghu Soviet in early February 1931 and the subsequent forced withdraw to regroup, Nationalist forces launched the second encirclement campaign against the Chinese Communist Party (CCP)'s revolutionary base area in Honghu on 1 March 1931. The Nationalists believed that the poorly supplied Communists had not had sufficient time to recover from the last encirclement campaign, so they wanted to strike quickly. The Nationalist commander-in-chief was the same one who had led the first campaign, 10th Army commander Xu Yuanquan. The 10th Army was not deployed directly in the campaign, but instead, deployed some distance away from the battlefield as strategic reserve. The brunt of the fighting was to be carried out mostly by troops of regional warlords who were nominally loyal Chiang Kai-shek.

The Communists were not jubilant after their victory achieved in first encirclement campaign, because they were fully aware the Nationalist withdraw was only temporary and it was only matter of time before the Nationalists resume their assault. To better prepare the defense of their base, the Communists restructured their organization. In the early March 1931, the Central Committee of the Chinese Communist Party sent Xia Xi to the Honghu Soviet for restructuring. To better coordinate administrative activities, CCP Hunan–Western Hubei Bureau was formed, and to better coordinate political activities, CCP provisional Hunan–Western Hubei provincial committee was formed. To better coordinate military affairs, Revolutionary military committee was formed, and Xia Xi was named as the CCP party secretary of the Hunan–Western Hubei Bureau, and the chairman of the revolutionary military committee. Cui Mei (崔玫) was named as the party secretary of the CCP provisional Hunan–Western Hubei provincial committee, and he was later succeeded by Yang Guanghua (杨光华). This restructuring of the CCP apparatus was proven to be catastrophic later on, when Xia Xi carried out huge purges on local CCP ranks, resulting in causing more damage than the military actions taken by their Nationalist enemy.

== Order of battle ==
Nationalists:

- Newly Organized 11th Division
- 19th Division
- 44th Brigade of the 15th Division
- 2 Brigades (including the 142nd Brigade) of the 48th Division
- Newly Organized 2nd Brigade
- Newly Organized 3rd Brigade

Communists:

- 9th Division (Brigade-sized)
  - Independent Regiment
  - 26th Regiment
- Hunan–Western Hubei Garrison Regiment
- Mianyang Independent Regiment
- Training Regiment
- Independent battalions of guerrillas

== First stage ==
On 1 March 1931, the Nationalist Newly Organized 11th Division and a brigade of the Nationalist 48th Division crossed the Yangtze River and attacked the Communist base on the southern bank. The local Communist force was unable to repel the numerically and technically superior Nationalist force, and was forced to fall back. The Nationalists took Ouchi (藕池) and Shishou (石首) as a result.

Communists were fully aware that they were no match for the enemy and reasoned that if they were to concentrate their forces and face off the enemy, they would be annihilated. Instead, the Communists decided to split their forces into two, operating on both banks of the Yangtze River, and once the Nationalists were stretched out too thin, the Communists would counterattack. The primary objectives of Communists were to defend their base on the southern bank of the Yangtze River, and to reestablish their base in the northern bank of the Yangtze River when possible, and if the enemy was overstretched and provided the needed opportunity, the Communist would establish new bases if possible. Under the command of Duan Dechang, the Communist Independent Regiment and CCP party apparatus crossed the Yangtze River, and began guerrilla warfare in the regions of Qianjiang, Mianyang (沔阳) and Jianli, deep behind the Nationalist line in the heart of the Nationalist-controlled area. Under the command Zhou Yiqun, the Communist force on the southern bank of the Yangtze River also began guerrilla warfare, and at the same time, a portion of the force penetrated deep into the regions around the Dongting Lake, while another portion of the force escorted the local populace to the Dongshan (东山) region.

== Second stage ==
In early April, 1931, Nationalist 142nd Brigade of the 48th Division, 44th Brigade of the 15th Division, Newly Organized 11th Division, and the 19th Division attacked toward Eastern Mountain region from Tiaoxuankou (调弦口), Wanyu (万庾), Huarong County, and Yueyang respectively. After two major clashes at regions of Sanweisi (三葑寺) and Songbanqiao (松板桥), the Communist attempt to check the Nationalist advance was crashed. Local Communist regular army and the Communist Huarong Guerrillas were forced to withdraw to the north of the Yangtze River by mid-April, and the Nationalist force succeeded in taking the Dongshan. However, by this time, the Nationalist force was overstretched, and was unable to eradicate the remaining Communist guerrillas in the newly conquered region, and moreover, their rear was constantly harassed by the Communists forces that had crossed the Yangtze River, and with the bulk of the force deployed away during the campaign, there was simply not enough troops to stay behind to guard the vast areas in the rear. Realizing the nationalists had overstretched themselves way beyond the threshold, the Communists jumped on the opportunity to counterattack.

While the crack troops of the Nationalist force was penetrating deep into the enemy territory and taking more lands, their rear was guarded by the second rate troops most consisted of poorly trained conscripts who were drafted just shortly prior to the first encirclement campaign against the Honghu Soviet. Seizing the opportunity, Communist force on the northern bank of the Yangtze River including the Independent Regiment attacked and took the town of Zhuhe (朱河) for four time, annihilated the 2nd Regiment of the nationalist Newly Organized 2nd Brigade in the process, forcing the nationalist brigade to be out of the action for the rest of the campaign. The Communist force operated on the northern bank of the Yangtze River also attacked the town of Fengkou (峰口) twice, completely annihilated two battalions of the nationalist Newly Organized 3rd Brigade in the process. A regiment of the nationalist Newly Organized 3rd Brigade consisted of newly drafted conscripts could not handle the pressure and after suffering a defeat that did not produce too much casualties, the surviving conscripts in the regiment deserted en masse. The destruction of the two nationalist newly organized brigades caused the total collapse in the new nationalist positions on the north bank of the Yangtze river, losing nearly all of the territories newly taken from the Communists during their earlier success, and the Communists thus successfully reestablished their original base on the northern bank of the river.

== Third stage ==
The complete recovery of the Communists on the northern bank of the Yangtze River marked the beginning of the Communist counteroffensive. In April 1931, the Communist Independent Regiment was expanded to have a second regiment, the 26th Regiment, and the new formation was renamed as the 9th Division of the 3rd Army, even though the new unit is only a brigade-sized formation at the best, since it only had two regiments. Additional Communist military units were also formed, including Hunan–Western Hubei Garrison Regiment, Mianyang Independent Regiment, Training Regiment and the Independent battalions of guerrillas of several counties in the Communist base. After the reorganization, Communists took the initiative by attacking the Nationalists, and in the battle fought in the region of Laoxinkou (老新口) in mid April, the previously badly mauled Nationalist Newly Organized 3rd Brigade was struck again with disastrous result: after each of the two surviving regiments of the Nationalist Newly Organized 3rd Brigade lost a battalion completely in the battle, the four surviving battalions of the two regiments of the Nationalist Newly Organized 3rd Brigade disintegrated when the conscripts in the surviving units deserted en masse. The Nationalist Newly Organized 3rd Brigade ceased to function and only existed in names on papers, and after the devastating defeat, regions including Longhaiwan (龙海湾), Xiongkou (熊口), Hanhekou (汉河口), and Dafengkou (大丰口) fell back into Communist hands by late April in a domino effect.

As warlords' armies begun to crumble, the strategic reserve, Chiang Kai-shek's own troop, the 10th Army could not offer any help because of the heightened tension between Chiang and warlords in Guangdong and Guangxi, so the 10th Army was redeployed to Changsha for the preparation to face off the warlords from the two provinces in case war broke out. Taking advantage of the infighting among the Nationalists themselves, the Communist force on the northern bank of the Yangtze River attacked toward Jiangling County, and by early June 1931, in a series of battles fought in the regions of Sanguandian (三官殿), Shagang (沙岗), Pujiguan (普济观), Haoxue (郝穴), and Wanjiaqiao (汪家桥), Communist force on the northern bank of the Yangtze River succeed in killing over two thousand Nationalist troops, capturing more than a thousand guns from the defeated Nationalists. The Communist force on the southern bank of the Yangtze River also made impressive gains in that it retook the Dongshan region, but during the process, their commander-in-chief Zhou Yiqun was killed in action in a battle near Yueyang. However, this Nationalist achievement was not enough to avert the strategic failure of the encirclement campaign and the Nationalists were forced to withdraw and call off the campaign. The Communists not only successfully defended their base, but also further strengthened it by expanding into the regions around Tongting Lake, and the Communist force on the southern bank of the Yangtze River crossed the Yangtze River after the campaign, and reorganized into the 26th Regiment of the 9th Division of the 3rd Army of the Chinese Red Army.

== See also ==
- Outline of the Chinese Civil War
- National Revolutionary Army
- History of the People's Liberation Army
