= Yeh Hsieh-chin =

Chinese politician

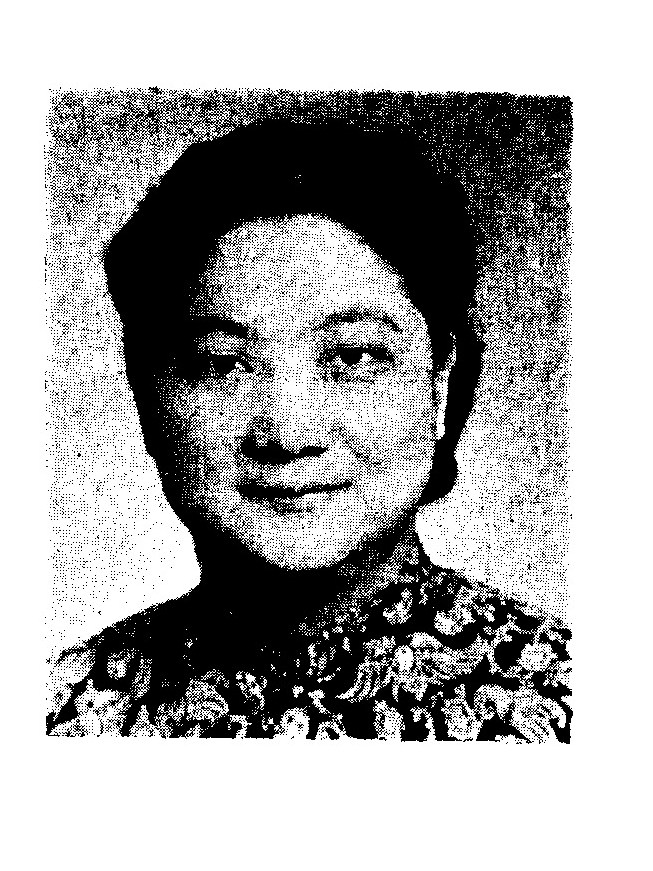
- Yeh in 1953

Member of the Legislative Yuan
- In office 1948–1990
- Constituency: Hubei

Personal details
- Born: 8 July 1911 Longkou, Hubei, Qing Empire
- Died: 12 October 2015 (aged 104) Vancouver, Canada

Yeh Hsieh-chin (Chinese: 葉叶琹, 8 July 1911 – 12 October 2015), also known as Helen Lee or Helen Hsieh-chin Yeh, was a Chinese politician. She was among the first group of women elected to the Legislative Yuan in 1948.

== Biography ==
Yeh was born in 1911, a native of Longkou in Jiayu County in Hubei province (present-day Longkou, Honghu). She attended Tianjin Nankai Girls' Middle School, after which she completed a two-year preparatory course for Nankai University. However, she was invited to attend Tsinghua University by its president Luo Jialun as one of the first eleven female students admitted to the university. After graduating from the Department of Politics, she continued as a graduate student until her father asked her to return south in 1933. Leaving university, she moved to Nanjing, where she worked for the Department of Examination and Examination. She married Lee Li-bai, an army general.

During the Second Sino-Japanese War Yeh fled to Sichuan with her sister. She became an English translator for the air force in their joint operations with American and British forces, being given the rank of civilian major. At the end of the war, she resigned and flew to Wuhan, finding her parents still alive. Deciding to stay in Wuhan, she joined the Women's Work Committee as director-general. Encouraged by her friends and family, Yeh was a Kuomintang candidate in Hubei in the 1948 elections for the Legislative Yuan and was elected to parliament. She relocated to Taiwan during the Chinese Civil War, where she became president of the Taipei branch of the Zonta International. She also served as director of the National Alliance of Taiwan Women's Associations and became a professor at National Chengchi University.

In September 1990 Yeh resigned from the Legislative Yuan and moved to Vancouver in Canada with her children. In 2006 she donated Can$1 million to Tsinghua University Education Foundation to support its School of Public Administration. She died in Vancouver in 2015.
