= Cai Hanqing =

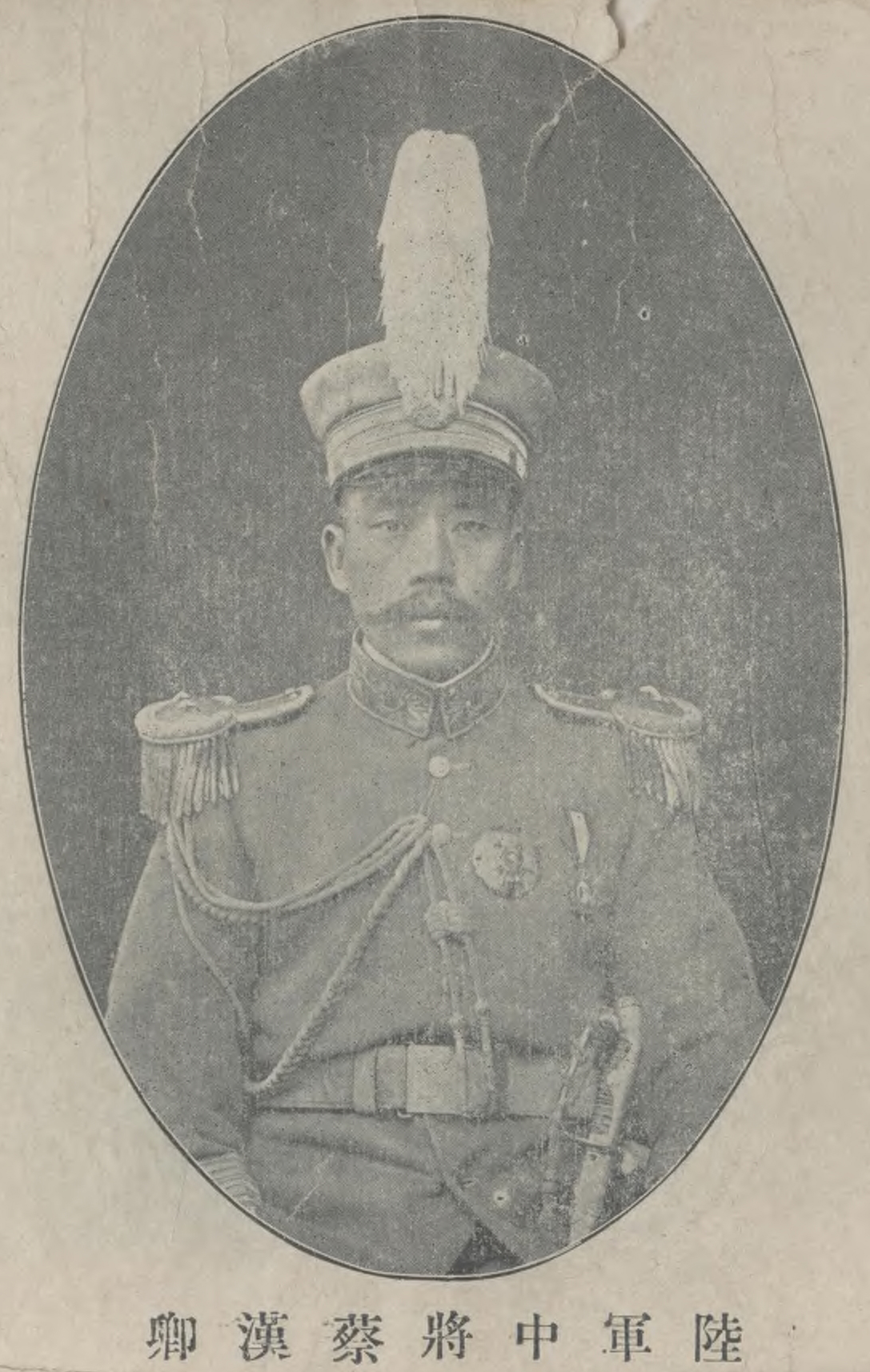
Cai Hanqing (1917).

Cai Hanqing (蔡汉卿; 1882 – 1952), courtesy name Xisheng (希圣) was a Chinese revolutionary and politician of the Republic of China. He was born in Laowan, Mianyang, today within the jurisdiction of Honghu, Hubei.

During the Wuchang Uprising, Cai Hanqing fired the first shot at the Qing Dynasty Viceroy of Huguang's Office, hence he was known as "Cai the First Shot" (蔡一炮).

== Biography ==
Cai Hanqing was born in 1882 into a peasant family in Qiandun Village, Laowan Township, Honghu. By the age of 16 he had lost both his parents and thus went to live with his uncle, herding cattle and studying at a private school. From this time on he became involved in anti-Qing activities. He then moved to Wuhan, where he later joined the Eighth Artillery Battalion as a soldier. Due to his excellent performance, he was later promoted to platoon leader.

During the Wuchang Uprising he knocked down some officers trying to stop him and his comrades from joining in the uprisings. He then led his men to seize the cannons and push them to the parade ground. He first fired the cannons towards the cavalry, prompting the cavalry to join the uprising.

When Cai Hanqing led his troops to approach the city of Wuchang, most of the area had been occupied by the uprising army, but the Governor-General of Huguang, Rui Cheng (瑞澂), and Zhang Biao (張彪), the commander of the Eighth Division of the Qing Army, led their troops to defend the Governor-General's Palace. Cai then led his troops to attack the palace, with Rui and Zhang narrowly escaping by digging a hole in the back wall of the besieged palace.

He then participated in the battle of Wuhan, defending it from the Qing. He was then promoted to the rank of division commander, and served as a senator in the Second National Assembly of the Republic of China (中華民國第二屆國會), and was then awarded the title of General of the General's Office (北洋将军府). He then retired to his hometown of Honghu. During the second Second Sino-Japanese War he took refuge in Sichuan. In 1945 he returned to Hubei. He would visit the Wuchang Martyrs' Shrine every year on the national day to pay his tributes to the martyrs. After the founding of the People's Republic of China, through the introduction of Xiong Jinhuai (熊晋槐), the vice governor of Hubei Province, Cai wanted to join the Revolutionary Committee of the Chinese Kuomintang. His death in 1952 prevented this. He was buried in Wuchang Cemetery.

== Family ==
Taiwanese singer Tsai Chin is his granddaughter.
