= Tsai Chin =

Tsai Chin may refer to:

- Tsai Chin (actress) (born 1933), actress from Shanghai, also known as Irene Chow
- Tsai Chin (singer) (born 1957), Taiwanese singer
