= Chen Hung-ming =

Taiwanese singer and songwriter

- Born: Penghu, Taiwan
- Citizenship: Taiwanese
- Occupations: Singer; Composer; Songwriter
- Musical career
- Instruments: Vocals; Guitar

Chinese name
- Traditional Chinese: 陳宏銘
- Simplified Chinese: 陈宏铭
Transcriptions
Standard Mandarin
- Hanyu Pinyin: Chén Hóngmíng
- Wade–Giles: Ch'en Hung-ming

Chen Hung-ming (Chinese: 陳宏銘) is a Taiwanese campus folk singer, songwriter, and member of Little Crow (小烏鴉合唱團) from Penghu. His most famous song is "Forgotten Times" (被遺忘的時光).

== Life ==
=== Folk style singer and songwriter ===
Chen Hung-ming lived in Penghu up to age seven, when he moved to Taipei.

During his third year of high school, Chen and two of his classmates participated in Haishan Records's 1978 first Folk Style (民謠風) competition at EVERGEEN Department store. They called themselves the Little Crow Trio (小烏鴉三重唱), and they performed their original composition "Goodbye Clouds" (別了彩雲). (Note: While Chen Hung-ming composed this song's melody, his brother, Chen Hung-chang (陳宏彰), wrote its lyrics.)

They ranked in the competition and thereafter gained recognition by Haishan Records and became a campus folk band. Little Crow recorded their songs into the Folk Style (民謠風) album series. They also provided backup vocals for Haishan Records artist Liu Chia-ling (劉嘉玲).

Chen’s works were also performed by other singers and included in the Folk Style series compilation albums. Several of his songs, including "Forgotten Times" and a song that is literally translated as "Morning Book" (晨書), were recorded in the debut album Farewell My Country (出塞曲) by Tsai Chin, who competed in the second Folk Style competition.

=== Later developments ===
Chen graduated from the Radio and Television Division of what is now Shih Hsin University.

At this point he returned home looking for a stable job, and after being discharged from his military service, he joined the Taiwan Police College and served as a police officer. Because he was often assigned to handle jobs related to music, he realized that he desired to do music for a living and thereafter quit his police job.

In 1993, he joined with Pao Chih-ching (包志青) to create the Little Crow and Wild Dove (小烏鴉與野鴿子) duet, with whom he published one album.

In about 2006, with the encouragement of Lee Ming-yang (李明洋), he started writing Taiwanese Hokkien songs. Since then, he has written at least 200 such songs.

After the movie Internal Affairs (無間道), which included his song "Forgotten Times," aired, the production company sent him a DVD of the film. Upon hearing his music, he reminisced on old times, and around 2010 he moved back to Penghu. There, he started a coffee shop and Judao Music Corporation (菊島音樂文化有限公司), and he resumed his musical activities.

In 2015, he wrote the song "Taiwan is Our Name" (台灣是咱的名) for the Kuomintang presidential nominee Hung Hsiu-chu.

== The Song "Forgotten Times" ==
When he was writing "Forgotten Times," Chen Hung-ming was only a high school junior. He was learning English at the time and reminiscing on his time living in Penghu as a young child. Because it seldom rained in Penghu, his happiest memory from childhood was hearing the sound of rain dripping on glass. It happened that at this time he had a guitar nearby, and he thereupon wrote this song. He originally planned to call the song "Who is Tapping on My Window" (是誰在敲打我窗).

After hearing Chen sing this song in the performance hall at the Folk Style competition, Tsai Chin expressed her interest in singing the song. She recorded this song in her 1980 personal album Farewell My Country.

The 2002 film Infernal Affairs set off a craze for this song, and the French version of it was thereafter used in the 2008 film Flight of the Red Balloon by director Hou Hsiao-hsien.

== Works ==
- "Goodbye Clouds," which he recorded in 1978 into the Folk Style and for which he was the principal singer
- "Forgotten Time," which was recorded by Tsai Chin in 1980 in the album Farewell My Country
- "Dewdrop" (露珠)," (Note: Chen Hung-ming composed this song.) which was recorded by YinShia in the album Your hands are so cold (妳那好冷的小手)
- "Calling to You" (聲聲叫著你), which was recorded by Chen Lei in the album Lost Dream (失落的夢)
- "I Love you Taiwan" (台灣我愛你), which was recorded by Chris Hung in the album Good Luck Man (男子漢加油)

== See also ==
- Campus folk song
