= Liu Ze =

Chinese linguist (1891–1978)

Liu Ze (Chinese: 刘赜, 1891–1978), courtesy name Bo Ping (Chinese: 博平), was a native of Guangji County, Hubei Province. He was a Chinese linguist.

== Biography ==
When he was young, he attended Yongxi Elementary School and Meichuan Middle School because of his family's poverty. Later, he was admitted to the Wuchang West Road School. When admitted to Peking University, because of inability to pay tuition, Huang Kan, a professor of the Chinese Department of the university, came forward to subsidize him and took him in as a disciple. He graduated from the Department of Chinese Language and Literature of Peking University in 1917, where he studied paleography and exegesis.

He was a professor at Jinan University in Shanghai, and in 1929 he was recommended by Mr. Huang Kan to teach at the Chinese Department of Wuhan University, where he worked for fifty years until his death in 1978. He taught courses on writing, phonetics, exegesis, and Zhouyi studies. He was the head of the Chinese Department for many years, and was one of the "Five Old" of the "Five Old and Eight Middle-aged" at Wuhan University at that time.

He was the author of "Jian Yuan Diaries", "Explanation of Sound and Rhyme Tables", "Saying Wen Ancient Rhyme Spectrum", "The First Writings on Friendship" and "Notes on Primary Schools".
