= Five Old and Eight Middle-aged =

Five Old and Eight Middle-aged or Five Lao and Eight Zhong (Chinese: 五老八中) is a synonym for a nationally acclaimed academic group formed during the heyday of Wuhan University's Chinese Department in the 1950s, when the department topped the Chinese departments of colleges and universities across the country because of its strong faculty lineup.

== Five Old ==
- Liu Yongji (Chinese: 刘永济), courtesy name Hongdu, known as "Hong Lao", was an expert in classical literature;
- Liu Ze (Chinese: 刘赜), known as "Bo Lao", was an expert in the phonetics of characters. He studied under the master of Chinese literature, Huang Kan, and his academic standard was praised by the great masters of Chinese literature Zhang Taiyan and Mr. Huang Jigang (Chinese: 黄季刚).
- Huang Zhuo (Chinese: 黄焯), known as "Yao Lao" (耀老), was an expert in Chinese classical studies and poetry. He was the cousin of Huang Kan.
- Xi Lusi (Chinese: 席鲁思), known as "Lu Lao", an expert in classics and history.
- Chen Dengque (Chinese: 陈登恪), known as "Deng Lao", an expert in novels of the Tang and Song dynasties. He was the son of Chen Sanli and the younger brother of Chen Yinke.

== Eight Middle-aged ==
- Cheng Qianfan (Chinese: 程千帆), an expert in classical literature, literary history and literature, and specializes in lecturing.
- Liu Shousong (Chinese: 刘绶松), mainly teaches courses on the history of new Chinese literature and is regarded as an expert on the history of new literature.
- Hu Guorui (Chinese: 胡国瑞), expert in classical literature.
- Zhou Dapu (Chinese: 周大璞), expert in linguistics.
- Li Jianzhang (Chinese: 李健章), head of the Classical Literature Program, an expert in classical literature, who wrote the inscription of the Memorial Pavilion for the June 1 Tragedy at Wuhan University (Chinese: 六一惨案).
- Li Gefei (Chinese: 李格非), expert in philology.
- Miao Kun (Chinese: 缪琨)
- Zhang Yongan (Chinese: 张永安)

== Others ==
The specific members of the "Five Old and Eight Middle-aged" have changed slightly, with Xu Tianmin (Chinese: 徐天闵) in the Five Old and Shen Zufen (Chinese: 沈祖棻) in the Eight Middle-aged.

== See also ==
- Wuhan University College of Chinese Language and Literature
