= Liu Xinyuan (calligrapher) =

- 劉心源
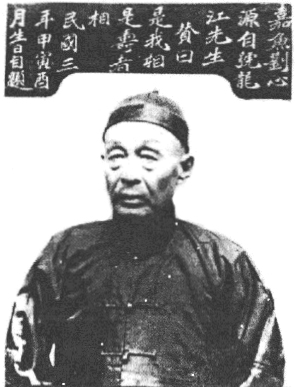
- Liu Xinyuan in 1914
- Born: 1848; Tengyunzhou, Longkou, Jiayu County, Hubei (now Longkou Town, Honghu)
- Died: 18 October 1915 (aged 66–67); Jiayu County, Hubei Province, China

Liu Xinyuan (劉心源; 1848 – 1915), courtesy name Ya Fu (亚甫), was a calligrapher, epigrapher, numismatist, writer and official in the late Qing Dynasty and early Republic of China.

== Biography ==
He was a native of Tengyunzhou, Longkou, Jiayu County, Hubei Province (now Longkou Town, Honghu). He participated in the provincial examination and became the sixty-seventh juren among the students with government stipends.

In the second year of the Guangxu era (1876), he was the 37th in the second class of the imperial examination, thus becoming a jinshi, and the 16th in the first class of the court examination. He was appointed as a probationary official in the Hanlin Academy. In the eighth year of the Guangxu era (1882), at the invitation of Li Hanzhang (李瀚章), the Governor-General of Huguang, and Peng Zuxian, the Governor of Hubei, he compiled the General History of Hubei (湖北通志).

He then served in a number of official posts including prefect of Kuizhou Prefecture (夔州府) in Sichuan, prefect of Chengdu Prefecture, and Provincial Surveillance Commissioner of Guangxi (广西按察使). After the Wuchang Uprising broke out he became an advisor of Li Yuanhong and helped stabilize the Hubei Military Government (中華民國軍政府鄂軍都督府). After the establishment of the Republic of China he served in a number of official posts including Civil Governor of Hubei and Governor of Hunan. He died in Jiayu on 18 October 1915.
