= Chen Wenzhu =

Chen Wenzhu (陈文烛; 1525 – 1595), courtesy name Yushu (玉叔), was a Ming Dynasty government official and writer.

He was a friend of Xu Zhongxing and Wu Cheng'en, and wrote the preface for two books of the latter. Government official and writer Fu Yi was his cousin.

== Biography ==
He was a native of Mianyang Prefecture (present-day Honghu, Hubei), where he was born in the fourth year of the Jiajing era (1525). He was born into a prominent family who had produced jinshi for three generations. He passed the provincial examination of Huguang in the 37th year of the Jiajing era (1558), becoming a juren. In the 44th year of the Jiajing era (1565), he became a jinshi in the third class.

In the fourth year of the Longqing era (1570), he became the prefect of Huai'an Prefecture. It was during this time that he met and befriend Wu Cheng'en, the author of Journey to the West, who was 30 years his senior. Despite the age difference they became close friends and Chen would later write the preface for two of Wu's books. After Wu's death he endeavored to have his friend's book printed.

He then served in a number of official posts including as prefect of Yingtian Prefecture and Minister of the Court of Judicial Review in Nanjing. Eight months after being appointed as such, Wu Zhipeng, a Supervising Secretary of the Ministry of Revenue of Nanjing, impeached him for accepting bribes from Xu Shengxun and for leniently letting his adopted son Yang Feng kill his master Xu Yaonian. He was then ordered to return to his hometown to hear the investigation. He then retired and died in the twenty-third year of the Wanli era (1595), at the age of sixty.

== Works ==
His works include the Eryouyuan Poetry Collection (二酉園詩集) in twelve volumes and the Wuyue Zhi (五嶽志), also in twelve volumes, a Qing Dynasty manuscript of which is still extant. He also wrote the preface for two books of Wu Cheng'en, in which he fervently praised him. The prefaces also contain other biographical material about Wu, and are important in the study of Wu's life.
