= Liu Shen =

Liu Shen (劉㴱; 1420 – ?), courtesy name Zizhi (資之), was a native of Huangpengshan (黄蓬山), Mianyang Prefecture, Huguang (now Honghu City, Hubei). He was originally a commoner who became a jinshi and politician of the Ming Dynasty.

== Biography ==
A commoner, he became a jinshi (successful candidate in the highest imperial examination) in the Ming Dynasty. He ranked twenty-third in the Shuntian Prefecture provincial examination. In the fourth year of the Zhengtong era (1439), he ranked fifty-first in the metropolitan examination and fortieth in the third class of the imperial examination. Liu Shen and fellow scholars Liu Yan (刘深）) and Liu Yuangang (刘元刚）) were known as the "Three Lius of Huangpengshan". About his home territory he wrote A Record of Huangpeng Mountain (记黄蓬山).

== Family ==
His great-grandfather was Liu Zhenxiang. His grandfather was Liu Jichuan, posthumously awarded the title of Hanlin Academy Reviewer. His father was Liu Zhuo, posthumously awarded the title of Hanlin Academy Reviewer, served as Assistant Instructor of the Imperial Academy.
