= Fourth encirclement campaign =

The fourth encirclement campaign can refer to one of several encirclement campaigns launched during the 1930s by the Nationalist Government of China against the Chinese soviets created by the Chinese Communist Party. These include:

- The fourth encirclement campaign against the Jiangxi Soviet, January to March, 1933
- The fourth encirclement campaign against the Eyuwan Soviet, July to October, 1932
- The fourth encirclement campaign against the Honghu Soviet, which was the second stage of the encirclement campaign against the Hunan-Western Hubei Soviet
