= Fu Yi (Ming Dynasty) =

Fu Yi (傅颐; 1512 – 1593), courtesy name Shizheng (师正), was a Ming Dynasty government official and writer. A jinshi, he was also a jieyuan, namely the juren who ranked first in the provincial examination. Fu was a friend of Wu Cheng'en, the author of Journey to the West.

== Biography ==
He was a native of the village of Caoshi in Mianyang Prefecture (today part of Honghu, Hubei). In the tenth year of the Jiajing era (1531), he ranked first in the provincial examination, thus becoming a jieyuan. In the eleventh year of the Jiajing era (1532), he became a jinshi, ranking fifty-fourth in the third class.

He was appointed magistrate of Luling County and also served as secretary and director of the Military Selection Department of the Ministry of War. He had troubles with Yan Song, due to an alleged offence, and was consequently demoted to the position of magistrate of Liuan County in Anhui. Even so, he achieved considerable success there by promoting local interests. He served as Governor of Jiangxi and Shandong and was later transferred to the position of Grand Canal Transport Commissioner of Huai'an.

Around this time, Fu befriended Wu Cheng'en in Huai'an. In 1559, Fu was promoted to Grand Canal Transport Commissioner of Nanjing. When he left Huai'an, Wu Cheng'en wrote a poem for him to congratulate him on his promotion. His cousin Chen Wenzhu, who served as prefect of Huai'an from 1570 to 1573, likewise developed a close friendship with Wu. He would later write the preface for two of Wu's books and endeavor to have his friend's book printed. While serving in Nanjing, Fu was again framed by Yan Song and dismissed from office. After Yan Song's death he returned to public service, serving successively as Vice Minister of Revenue in Nanjing and Censor-in-Chief of Nanjing.

He wrote a memorial titled Five Articles on Current Affairs (时政五条), which the Wanli Emperor ordered the Ministry of Personnel and the Censorate to implement. In 1573 he served as Minister of Revenue in Nanjing. He retired in 1574 and went back to his native Hubei.
