= First encirclement campaign against the Honghu Soviet =

1930 military campaign

- Part of the Chinese Civil War
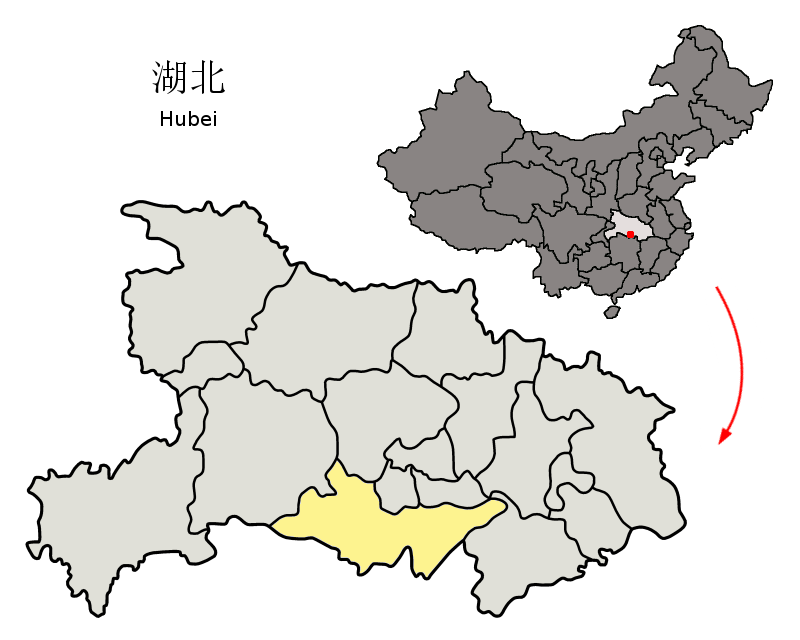
- Location of Honghu, Jingzhou
Date	Early December 1930 – end of January 1931
Location	Honghu, Jingzhou, China
Result	Communist victory

Belligerents
Nationalist China	Chinese Red Army

Commanders and leaders
Xu Yuanquan	He Long

Strength
>22,000	5,000

Casualties and losses
5,000+	Light

The first encirclement campaign against the Honghu Soviet was an encirclement campaign launched by the Chinese Nationalist Government that was intended to destroy the Communist Honghu Soviet and its Chinese Red Army. The Red Army successfully defended their soviet republic against the Nationalist attacks from early December 1930 to the end of January 1931.

== See also ==
- Outline of the Chinese Civil War
- National Revolutionary Army
- People's Liberation Army
- History of the People's Liberation Army
