= Wang Baixin =

Qing Dynasty writer and jinshi (1799–1873)

Wang Baixin (王柏心; 1799 – 1873), courtesy name Zishou (子寿), was a jinshi and writer from the Qing Dynasty

== Biography ==
He was a native of Jianli County, Hubei Province (now Luoshan Town, Honghu). He was born in the fourth year of the Jiaqing era (1799).

In 1838, Lin Zexu went to Guangzhou to ban opium and visited Wang in Luoshan. In July of the twenty-second year of the Daoguang era (1842), Lin Zexu arrived in Lanzhou and wrote letters to Wang and Yao Chun.

In the twenty-fourth year of the Daoguang era (1844), he became a jinshi. He was proficient in classical texts and knowledgeable in poetry. He received an official appointment but soon afterwards resigned and asked to return home. He devoted himself to teaching and compiling the Dangyang County Annals (當陽縣志). When the Taiping Army captured Luoshan, he fled to Hunan and became acquainted with Zeng Guofan, Hu Linyi, Zuo Zongtang, Li Mengqun and others. He was also a painter and liked to paint orchids. Guo Songtao said of him: "Before he was forty, his writings were already the best in the country. When people in Hunan and Hubei discussed classics, history and literature, they would definitely refer to him. [...] When people in the Jianghan region discussed morality they would refer to him for more than fifty years." He died in the twelfth year of the Tongzhi era (1873).

He authored works such as Qishi Yin Baizhutang Shi (漆室吟百柱堂诗), Zishou Shi Chao (子寿诗钞), and Luozhou Jin Gao (螺洲近稿). In the 23rd year of the Daoguang era, Tao Liang published Wang's Zishou Shi Chao, and in the first year of the Xianfeng era, Luozhou Jin Gao was reprinted. In the 24th year of the Guangxu era, the Tang family of Chengshan published Qishi Yin Baizhutang Shi in Guiyang, in 53 volumes.

He had a son named Wang Jiashi (王傢仕).
