= Liu Shousong =

Chinese literary historian

Liu Shousong (Chinese: 刘绶松, 刘寿嵩, 1912–1969), native of Honghu, Hubei Province, was a Chinese literary historian.

== Biography ==
In 1952, Liu Shousong became an associate professor, then a professor of the Chinese Department of Wuhan University, lecturing on the history of Chinese literature. 1956, he joined the Chinese Communist Party as well as the China Writers Association, and served as the director of the Modern Chinese Literature Department of the Chinese Department of Wuhan University, where he published The History of New Chinese Literature, which was designated as a textbook for institutions of higher learning. In the following year, he was elected vice-chairman of the Wuhan branch of the China Writers' Association. He was also deputy editor-in-chief of Yangtze River Literature and Art, a standing committee member of the Wuhan Federation of Literature and Literature, head of the Literature Department, and a member of the Presidium of the Hubei Provincial Federation of Philosophy and Social Sciences. He was persecuted during the Cultural Revolution, and on March 16, 1969, he hanged himself with his wife, Zhang Jifang, and died in disgrace.

Around the time of the 3rd Plenary Session of the 11th Central Committee of the Chinese Communist Party (CPC), the work of vindicating wrongful convictions began to unfold. Luo Wen, then chairman of the Hubei Provincial Federation of Literature and Culture and chairman of the Hubei Provincial Association of Writers, proposed to vindicate Liu Shousong, after which the "Liu Shousong Vindication Conference" was held in the gymnasium of Wuhan University.

== See also ==
- Five Old and Eight Middle-aged
