= The Legend of Beggar King and Big Foot Queen (TV series) =

Chinese television series

- Genre: historical fiction comedy romance
- Directed by: Yang Xiaobo
- Starring: Benny Chan Ning Jing Li Chen
- Country of origin: Mainland China

Production
- Running time: 45 minutes

Original release
- Release: 25 June 2016

The Legend of Beggar King and Big Foot Queen (Chinese: 乞丐皇帝与大脚皇后传奇; lit. 'The Legend of the Beggar Emperor and the Bigfoot Empress Consort') is a 2016 Mainland Chinese period comedy television drama starring Benny Chan and Ning Jing. Set in the 14th imperial century China, the drama is based on the life of Hongwu Emperor (played by Benny Chan) and Chen Youliang (played by Ji Chen). The story revolves around the founding emperor Ming - Hongwu Zhu Yuanzhang and his wife Ma Xiuying (played by Ning Jing). Ma is the empress consort famous for her "big feet" because it was not bound like other women where foot binding was the beauty standard for women.
