= Battle of Xuchang =

- Part of the Central Plains War
Date	June 10–12, 1930
Location	Xuchang, Henan

Belligerents
National Revolutionary Army 48th Division	anti-Chiang coalition

Commanders and leaders
Xu Yuanquan	Zhang Weixi

Casualties and losses
- ~2,000 in total

The Battle of Xuchang was fought between the National Revolutionary Army of the Republic of China and a coalition opposing Chiang Kai-shek. Both sides were part of the Kuomintang. The attack was launched in June 1930 by Feng Yuxiang. As part of the operation Feng's cavalry attacked the airfield at Guide (Shangcai). Chiang Kai-shek launched a counterattack in late June against Kaifeng.

== Bibliography ==
- 中華民國國防大學編，《中國現代軍事史主要戰役表》
