= Fu Prefecture (Hubei) =

Historical administrative division in Hubei, China

Fuzhou or Fu Prefecture (復州) was a zhou (prefecture) in imperial China, centering on modern Xiantao, Hubei, China. It existed (intermittently) from mid-6th century until 1278. Between 1275 and 1278 during the Yuan dynasty it was known as Fuzhou Route (復州路).

== Geography ==
The administrative region of Fuzhou in the Tang dynasty is in modern southern Hubei. It probably includes parts of modern:

- Xiantao
- Tianmen
- Under the administration of Jingzhou:
  - Honghu
  - Jianli County
