= Chahe, Hubei =

Chahe 汊河镇
- Town
- Location in Hubei
- Coordinates: 30°0′4″N 113°27′59″E
- Country: People's Republic of China
- Province: Hubei
- Prefecture-level city: Jingzhou
- County-level city: Honghu
- Time zone: UTC+8 (China Standard)

Chahe (Chinese: 汊河; pinyin: Chāhé) is a town in Honghu, Hubei. As of 2020, it administers Chahu Residential Community, Lihu Fishing Farm Residential Zone (里湖渔场生活区), as well as the following eighteen villages:

- Chahe Village
- Xiaogang Village (小港村)
- Shuanghe Village (双河村)
- Hongfeng Village (红丰村)
- Longkeng Village (龙坑村)
- Longjia Village (龙甲村)
- Chenyan Village (陈晏村)
- Yongxing Village (永兴村)
- Xingfu Village (幸福村)
- Yingnan Village (应南村)
- Shiyangwan Village (石杨湾村)
- Yanshagan Village (沿沙甘村)
- Baiyun Village (白云村)
- Hongsan Village (红三村)
- Xichi Village (西池村)
- Xinxue Village (新穴村)
- Wufeng Village (五丰村)
- Shuijing Village (水晶村)
