= Encirclement campaign against the Hunan–Western Hubei Soviet =

1932 military campaign

- Part of the Chinese Civil War
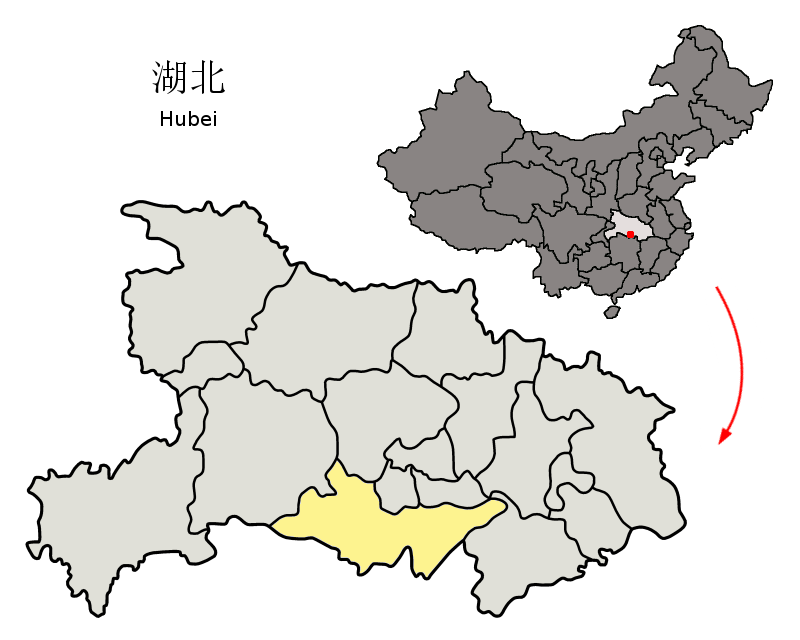
- Location of Honghu, Jingzhou
Date	June, 1932 – early January, 1933
Location	Honghu, Kingchow, Hupeh
Result	Nationalist victory

Belligerents
Nationalist China	Chinese Red Army

Commanders and leaders
Chu Yun-chuan; Chen Chu-chen	Hsia Hsi; Ho Lung

Strength
>25,000	15,000

Casualties and losses
5,000+	12,000

The encirclement campaign against the Hunan–Western Hubei Soviet was an encirclement campaign launched by the Chinese Nationalist Government that was intended to destroy the communist Hunan–Western Hubei Soviet and its Chinese Red Army in the local region. The Communists' responded by launching the Counter-encirclement campaign at Hunan–Western Hubei Soviet (Chinese: 湘鄂西苏区反围剿), also called by the communists as the Counter-encirclement campaign at Hunan–Western Hubei Revolutionary Base (Chinese: 湘鄂西革命根据地反围剿) (Chinese: 湘鄂西革命根据地反围剿), in which the Nationalist force defeated the local Chinese Red Army and overran the communist base in the southern Hubei and Hunan provinces from November 1930 to January 1931. Since the bulk of the fighting was fought at the second stage of the campaign, concentrated at the heart of the communist base, the Honghu region of Jingzhou, the campaign is therefore also frequently referred as the Fourth encirclement campaign against Honghu Soviet and the Fourth Counter-encirclement campaign at Honghu Revolutionary Base (Chinese: 洪湖革命根据地第四次反围剿) by the communists, or Fourth Counter-encirclement campaign at Honghu Soviet (Chinese: 洪湖苏区第四次反围剿) for short.

== See also ==
- Outline of the Chinese Civil War
- National Revolutionary Army
- People's Liberation Army
- History of the People's Liberation Army
- Chinese Civil War
