= Xu Yuanquan =

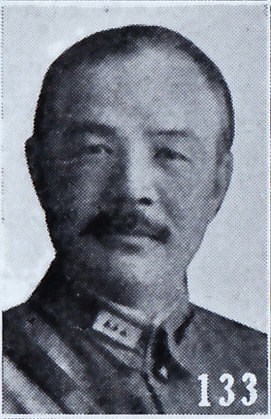
- Xu Yuanquan as pictured in The Most Recent Biographies of Chinese Dignitaries
- Born: 1885 or 1886; Huanggang, Hubei
- Died: 1960 Taipei, Taiwan
- Allegiance: Beiyang government Republic of China
- Branch: National Pacification Army; National Revolutionary Army
- Commands: 48th Division; 10th Army; 2nd Army; 26th Army Group
- Conflicts: Northern Expedition; Central Plains War; Battle of Xuchang; Chinese Civil War; Second encirclement campaign against the Honghu Soviet; Second Sino-Japanese War; Battle of Nanking; Battle of Xuzhou; Battle of Wuhan
- Awards: Order of the Sacred Tripod

Xu Yuanquan (Chinese: 徐源泉; Wades-Giles: Hsü Yüan-ch'üan; c. 1885–1960) was a Kuomintang general. He was born in Huanggang, Hubei. An eyewitness to the Wuchang Uprising, he was a subordinate of Zhang Zongchang before joining the Kuomintang. He was commander of the 48th Division of the Nationalist forces in 1930. In 1933 he was commanding the Tenth Army, stationed in Changsha, and he was involved in the opium trade.
