= Jiayu County =

Jiayu County 嘉鱼县 Kiayü
- County
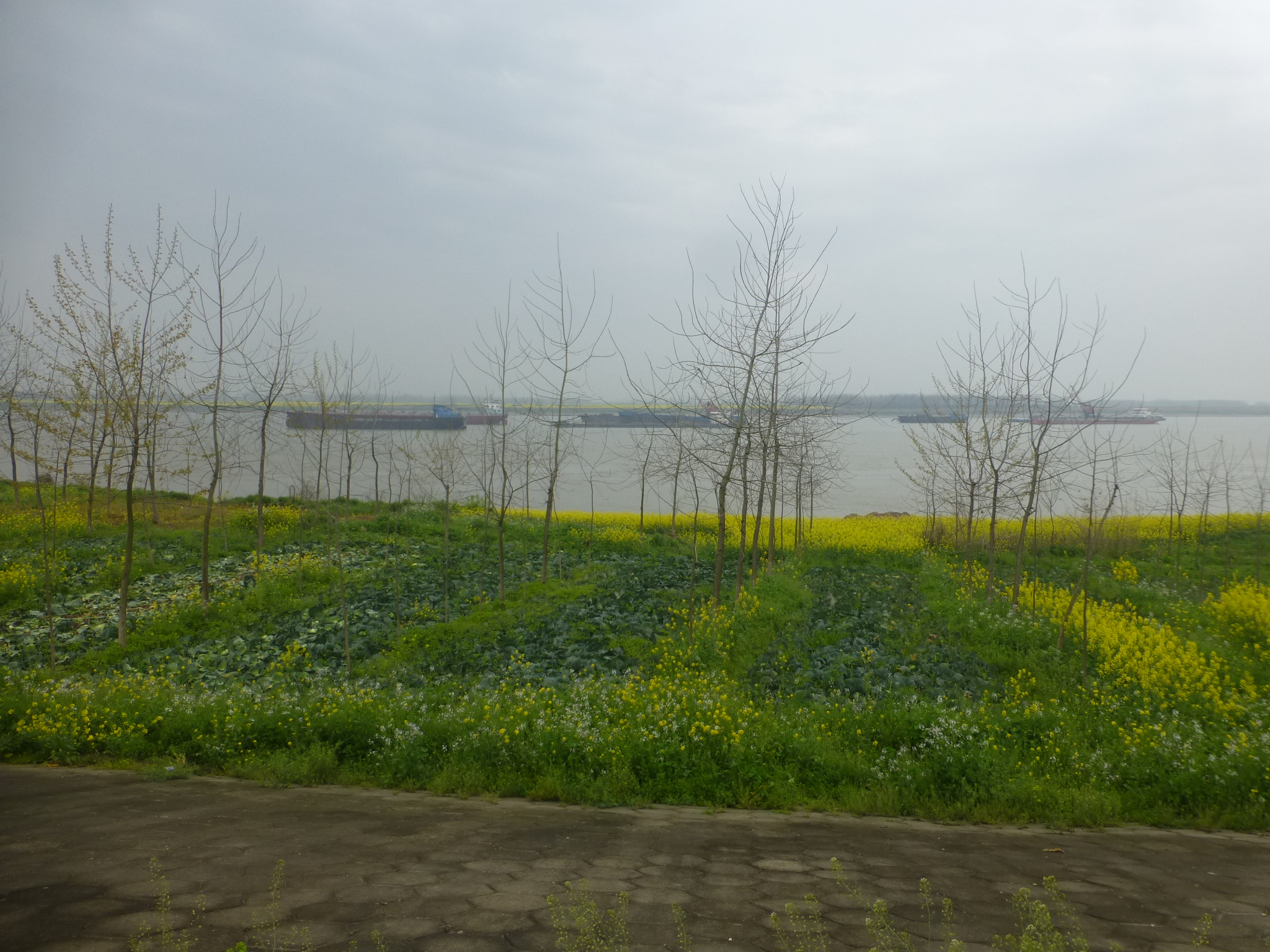
- Panjiawan - on the Yangtze embankment

- Location in Hubei
- Coordinates: 30°03′N 114°03′E
- Country: People's Republic of China
- Province: Hubei
- Prefecture-level city: Xianning

Area
  - Total: 1,018.4 km^{2} (393.2 sq mi)

Population (2020)
  - Total: 285,642
  - Density: 280.48/km^{2} (726.44/sq mi)
- Time zone: UTC+8 (China Standard)

Jiayu County (simplified Chinese: 嘉鱼县; traditional Chinese: 嘉魚縣; pinyin: Jiāyú Xiàn) is a county of southeastern Hubei province, People's Republic of China, located on the southeast (right) bank of the Yangtze River. It is under the administration of Xianning City and has a land area of 1,018.4 square kilometres (393.2 sq mi), and a population of 285,642 in 2020.

== Administrative divisions ==
Jiayu County consists of eight towns: Yuyue (鱼岳), Luxi (陆溪), Gaotieling (高铁岭), Guanqiao (官桥), Xinjie (新街), Panjiawan (潘家湾), Dupu (渡普), Paizhouwan (簰洲湾).

== Climate ==
Climate data for Jiayu, elevation 62 m (203 ft), (1991–2020 normals, extremes 1981–present)
Month	Jan	Feb	Mar	Apr	May	Jun	Jul	Aug	Sep	Oct	Nov	Dec	Year
Record high °C (°F)	23.6 (74.5)	29.7 (85.5)	35.4 (95.7)	36.3 (97.3)	36.4 (97.5)	38.2 (100.8)	39.5 (103.1)	40.2 (104.4)	38.7 (101.7)	35.2 (95.4)	35.8 (96.4)	25.6 (78.1)	40.2 (104.4)
Mean daily maximum °C (°F)	8.4 (47.1)	11.5 (52.7)	16.2 (61.2)	22.7 (72.9)	27.2 (81.0)	30.3 (86.5)	33.4 (92.1)	32.8 (91.0)	28.8 (83.8)	23.3 (73.9)	17.3 (63.1)	11.1 (52.0)	21.9 (71.4)
Daily mean °C (°F)	4.8 (40.6)	7.5 (45.5)	11.8 (53.2)	18.0 (64.4)	22.7 (72.9)	26.2 (79.2)	29.3 (84.7)	28.6 (83.5)	24.5 (76.1)	18.9 (66.0)	12.9 (55.2)	7.1 (44.8)	17.7 (63.8)
Mean daily minimum °C (°F)	2.1 (35.8)	4.5 (40.1)	8.5 (47.3)	14.3 (57.7)	19.2 (66.6)	23.1 (73.6)	26.1 (79.0)	25.5 (77.9)	21.3 (70.3)	15.7 (60.3)	9.7 (49.5)	4.1 (39.4)	14.5 (58.1)
Record low °C (°F)	−6.3 (20.7)	−5.9 (21.4)	−1.3 (29.7)	2.8 (37.0)	10.5 (50.9)	14.1 (57.4)	19.4 (66.9)	16.8 (62.2)	12.1 (53.8)	4.6 (40.3)	−1.6 (29.1)	−8.1 (17.4)	−8.1 (17.4)
Average precipitation mm (inches)	68.4 (2.69)	81.8 (3.22)	117.6 (4.63)	170.0 (6.69)	183.1 (7.21)	247.4 (9.74)	210.8 (8.30)	121.1 (4.77)	69.7 (2.74)	77.7 (3.06)	69.7 (2.74)	39.9 (1.57)	1,457.2 (57.36)
Average precipitation days (≥ 0.1 mm)	11.3	12.0	14.6	12.9	13.5	13.3	11.5	10.5	8.1	9.5	9.6	8.6	135.4
Average snowy days	4.4	2.3	0.7	0	0	0	0	0	0	0	0.2	1.0	8.6
Average relative humidity (%)	78	77	77	76	76	80	77	78	76	76	76	74	77
Mean monthly sunshine hours	95.5	94.8	117.7	148.5	163.9	163.9	220.3	219.3	168.3	149.0	133.1	123.3	1,797.6
Percentage possible sunshine	29	30	32	38	39	39	52	54	46	43	42	39	40
Source: China Meteorological Administration
