= Tsai Chin (singer) =

- 蔡琴
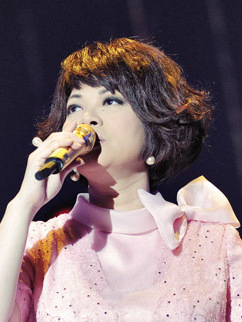
- Chin in 2008
- Born: 22 December 1957 (age 68); Kaohsiung, Taiwan
- Years active: 1970s–present
- Spouse: Edward Yang (1985–1995)
- Awards: Golden Melody Awards – Best Female Mandarin Artist 1991
- Musical career
- Genres: C-pop; Mandopop; Hokkien pop; folk
- Labels: UFO Records, Warner (1984–1996), Universal (from 2007)

Tsai Chin (Chinese: 蔡琴; pinyin: Cài Qín; Wade–Giles: Ts'ai^{4} Ch'in^{2}; Pe̍h-ōe-jī: Chhoà Khîm; b. 1957) is a Taiwanese pop and folk musician. Tsai sings in both Mandarin Chinese and Taiwanese Hokkien.

== Music career ==
Tsai's hits include "Forgotten Times" (《被遺忘的時光》), "Just Like Your Tenderness" (《恰似你的温柔》), "The Last Night" (《最後一夜》), "Reading You" (《讀你》) and "The Spirit of Your Eyes" (《你的眼神》). The peak of her popularity in Taiwan was from the late 1970s to the mid-1990s, but she remains popular in Mainland China.

Tsai's albums Tsai Chin Live 2007 and Golden Voice were both recognized with a "Top-10-Selling Mandarin Albums of the Year" award at the 2007 IFPI Hong Kong Album Sales Awards, presented by the Hong Kong branch of IFPI.

== Personal life ==
Tsai was married to Taiwanese director Edward Yang from 1985 to 1995. Tsai was featured alongside Hou Hsiao-Hsien in Yang's 1985 film Taipei Story. She is the granddaughter of Cai Hanqing.

== Discography ==
UFO Group	Album	Label	Notes
1980	《出塞曲》	Haishan Records	
May 1981	《秋瑾》	Haishan Records	
Sept 1981	《你的眼神》	Haishan Records	
Sept 1982	《一千個春天》	四海	
Sept 1982	《再愛我一次》	Haishan Records	
Nov 1982	《藍色的夢》	Haishan Records	
March 1983	《不了情》	Haishan Records	
May 1983	《昨夜之燈》	Haishan Records	
Nov 1983	《世界名曲專輯》	Haishan Records	
April 1984	《此情可待》	UFO Group	
July 1985	《癡癡的等》(TO WAIT DEVOTEDLY)	UFO Group	
1986	《蔡琴個人演唱會精選》	UFO Group	14 –16 Oct 1983 HK AC Hall Concert
March 1986	《傷心小站》(HEARTBREAK STATION)	UFO Group	
Dec 1986	《飛向未來》	UFO Group	
Sept 1987	《第一種聲音》	UFO Group	
Nov 1987	《時間的河》	UFO Group	
Dec 1987	《美就是心中有愛》	UFO Group	中華民國小姐選拔特別專輯
1988	《人生就是戲》(LIFE IS A SHOW)	UFO Group	
June 1988	《火舞》(DANCE OF FIRE)	UFO Group	
Oct 1989	《談心》(ABOUT HEARTS)	UFO Group	
Dec 1990	《回到未來》~國語懷念老歌	UFO Group	
Dec 1990	《回到未來》~台語懷念老歌	UFO Group	
Dec 1991	《太陽出來了》	UFO Group	
July 1992	《你不要那樣看著我的眼睛》	Pony Canyon Taiwan	
Sept 1993	《一曲成名-輝煌時代》	UFO Group	
Jan 1994	《新感情舊回憶》	Dien Jiang	
July 1995	《Late Night Show》	Dien Jiang	
Jan 1996	《民歌蔡琴》	Dien Jiang	
Feb 1996	《情歌蔡琴》	EMI Taiwan	
June 1996	《飄浪之女》台語專輯	Dien Jiang	
July 1997	《傻话 心太急》《Rush》	Dien Jiang	
Feb 1998	《答案》	Rock Records	與萬芳合唱單曲
Sept 1998	《原聲帶》	Warner Music Taiwan	
Feb 1999	《音樂大世紀-歌癮十五年》	UFO Group	UFO ARTISTS
Sept 1999	《精選蔡琴》	EMI	
Sept 1999	《沒有男人的房子不算家》	Warner Music Taiwan	【天使不夜城】歌舞劇原聲帶
March 2000	《機遇》	Godot Theatre Company	【淡水小鎮】原聲帶
June 2000	《To Encounter》	Zruden Music	
Sept 2000	《花天走地》	Universal Music	
Feb 2001	金片子【壹】- 天涯歌女	Zruden Music	
Feb 2001	金片子【貳】- 魂縈舊夢	Zruden Music	
July 2001	《橘子紅了》	Zruden Music	
Sept 2001	《Continue》	Zruden Music	
Jan 2002	《蔡琴一起走來香港演唱會Live》	Better Music	
Aug 2002	《Mesmerized》蔡琴懷舊精選	Warner Music Taiwan	
Sept 2003	《情盡夜上海回憶錄》	Godot Theatre Company	【情盡夜上海】雋永老歌歌舞劇
Feb 2004	《Best of The Best》	Warner Music Taiwan	
March 2004	《抒琴時間》	EMI Taiwan	
July 2004	《Under The Moon Light 2004》	Tianyi	
May 2005	《一千個春天》【經典復刻版】	music543.com	
April 2007	《不了情2007經典歌曲香港演唱會》	Universal Music Hong Kong	
Oct 2007	蔡琴《金聲演奏廳》	Universal Music Hong Kong	
Nov 2008	不悔	Universal Music Taiwan	
Aug 2009	愛像一首歌	Universal Music Taiwan	
April 2010	如夢令	Skyhigh Entertainment	
Aug 2013	全新飛翔	Sony Music	
Oct 2014	Reunion(OT:Ça va pas changer le monde)	Sony Music	

== Filmography ==
Year	Title	Original Title	Role
1984	The Last Night of Madam Chin	金大班的最後一夜	
1985	Taipei Story	青梅竹馬	Ah-chen
1986	Love Unto Waste	地下情	Chao Su-ling
1991	A Brighter Summer Day	牯嶺街少年殺人事件	Wang's wife
1996	Before Sunrise	黎明之前	Mother

== In popular culture ==
Tsai's song "Forgotten Times" (《被遺忘的時光》) is featured prominently in the 2002 hit Hong Kong film Infernal Affairs as a recurring element of its story line, and also in its sequels. Besides serving to elucidate the theme of the films, the song plays an important plot function in chronologically connecting various elements of the story.
