= Huang Kan =

Chinese phonologist, philologist and revolutionary

- Born: Qiaonai (乔鼐), Qiaoxin (乔馨); Chengdu, Sichuan
- Died: October 8, 1935 (aged 49); Nanjing, Jiangsu
- Other names: Courtesy name "Jizi (季子)" and art name "Liangshou Jushi" (量守居士)
- Years active: Late Qing dynasty – Republic of China (early 20th century)
- Spouse(s): Wang Caiheng (王采蘅), Huang Shaolan (黄绍兰), Huang Juying (黄菊英), and others

Academic background
- Influences: Zhang Taiyan (章太炎), Liu Shipei (刘师培), Qian Xuantong (钱玄同)

Academic work
- Discipline: Chinese philology, phonetics

Huang Kan (Chinese: 黃侃; 1886 – 8 October 1935), courtesy name Jigang (季剛), born into a family of Hubei ancestry in Chengdu, Sichuan province, was a Chinese phonologist, philologist and revolutionary.

As a teen, he tested into Wuchang School, a prestigious secondary school, but then was expelled for spreading anti-Qing sentiments. He then went to study in Japan and became a student of the Chinese scholar and philologist Zhang Taiyan. Huang was regarded as the most important phonologist since the high Qing (1644–1912) and gained recognition at first through his literary criticism of the sixth century. Later on, he taught at a number of universities in mainland China.

Huang's major contribution lies in his research on ancient Chinese phonology. He was the first to question established theories of rhyme schemes (patterns of sounds at the end of lines in poetry) in ancient literature. Huang proposed twenty-eight variations instead of the older version of twenty-six variations established by his teacher Zhang. He also proposed a new categorization of the ancient consonantal system that separated the oldest nineteen sounds from the existing theory of forty-one sounds.

As an educator, Huang was known for his innovative ways of teaching. His students particularly admired his integrity and courage in cases of political disagreement with university administrations. His personal life outside of academia was one with much drama as well, including multiple conflicts with authorities and allegedly nine marriages. He eventually died from over consumption of alcohol.

== Early life ==
=== Childhood ===
Born in a large family, Huang Kan was the tenth child of Huang Yunhu (黄云鹄) and Zhou Ruren (周孺人). Huang Yunhu was a high-ranking government official in the late Qing dynasty. Although corruption was common among government officials during that time, he did not take part in such practices. As a result, his family was frugal despite Huang's political influence and academic achievements. As the second surviving son of the family, Huang Kan showed strong interest in literature and books in general from a very young age and reportedly could memorize texts verbatim upon first reading. At the young age of four, his family hired Jiang Shuhai, a retired government official and a family friend, as Huang Kan's tutor. Huang Kan, who not only read but also memorized the many books he read, quickly became well known as a prodigy in the area.

=== Early education ===
In 1903, at the age of eighteen, Huang Kan tested into the Hubei Liberal School, Wuchang Xuetang (“湖北普通文学堂”, “武昌学堂”). The Qing dynasty, the last living Chinese imperial state, was on the verge of collapsing at this time. During the three years Huang Kan spent at this school, he was highly influenced by the progressive scholars and thinkers around him, and especially excited about the idea of revolution and rising up against the monarchy. Huang Kan was not afraid to challenge or embarrass authority figures. Multiple “incidents” with a corrupt administrator eventually resulted in his being expelled from school. Huang Kan's father was old friends with Zhang Zhidong (张之洞), the Viceroy of Huguang (a very high-ranking position in the Qing government). Recognizing Huang Kan's talent and wanting to do a favor for his old friend, Zhang pulled strings to sponsor Huang Kan to study in Japan.

Huang Kan started studying at Waseda University in 1903, which was during the period leading up to Xinhai Revolution, the revolution that eventually overthrew the Qing monarchy. He joined Tongmenghui ("Chinese United League"), a major resistance group against the Qing dynasty. Zhang Zhidong, being an official in the Qing government, consequently rescinded Huang's scholarship for Japan. Huang Kan then continued living in Japan as a political refugee. He became Zhang Taiyan's student there, learning philology and phonetics. Together with Zhang and Liu Shipei, the three were later termed "國學大師 (masters of Chinese scholarship, sinology)". Aside from scholarly contributions, they also aided the revolution remotely by creating an influential political newspaper The People Journal (“民报”) in addition to publishing various individual political writings.

== Professional life ==
=== As a linguist ===
Huang Kan and Zhang Taiyan were the last great masters in the Chinese philological tradition, and helped lay the foundation of modern Chinese linguistics. Huang was the first to propose a convincing initial systems of Old Chinese.

In 1911, Huang Kan moved to Shanghai after his mother's death in Hubei. And from 1911 to 1914, he focused his study in three major works,:

- Erya (尔雅), the oldest living Chinese dictionary and encyclopedia; 3rd century BC before the Qin dynasty;
- Shuowen (说文), first dictionary to analyze structure of Chinese characters; early 2nd century during the Han dynasty
- and Guangyun (广韵), a rhyme dictionary that categorizes characters by their sounds instead of writing; 1007–1008 during the Song dynasty.

Although the writing tradition of Chinese has maintained extensive records throughout centuries, the phonetics remains a topic of much debate. Huang reset the parameters of the phonetic development of the Chinese language ("汉语音韵学") to nineteen consonants and twenty-eight vowels. Zhang Taiyan once said that no other work in history of Chinese linguistics, Xiaoxue ("小学", discipline that studies ancient Chinese) has ever reached the depth of Huang Kan. Huang further developed Zhang and Qian Xuantong's preliminary findings and published one of his most famous works Nineteen Sounds of Ancient Phonology《古音十九纽》in 1924. In the book, he broke the sounds down by certain manners of articulation:

- three kinds of sounds that involve the throat (喉音)
- three kinds of sounds that involve teeth (牙音)
- five kinds of sounds that involve the tongue (舌音)
- four kinds of sounds that involve teeth (齿音)
- four kinds of sounds that involve lips (唇音)

(Note: "teeth" in modern Chinese is a disyllabic word, "牙齿" but Huang makes the distinction of "牙" and "齿" in terms of manner of articulation as seen above)

Huang adopted a scientific model of categorization and analysis. He also outlined and gave examples of how these ancient sounds have developed into contemporary phonetics. He termed them as "original sound" (本声) and "changed sound" (变声). This was very significant to the history of Chinese linguistics in that Xiaoxue was starting to be transformed from the study of ancient Chinese lexicography or literature to the discipline of linguistics as we know it today. Although this was a widely accepted theory, scholars like Lin Yutang and Qi Peirong openly disagreed with Huang. Lin Yutang, in his publication "The consonants that have disappeared from ancient phonology" (古音中已经遗失的声母), pointed out Huang's failure to incorporate analyses of vowels in his theory and that his line of logic constitutes a circular, thus erroneous argument. Lin also cast doubt on the field's standard on categorization in general.

Despite his political progressiveness, Huang Kan was amongst the classicist scholars in Republican China, which employed "rigorous historicism" as method of analysis in philology giving great attention to old texts and data. Classicist scholars gave very little credit to individual authorship. Instead, they emphasized on building a legacy of "empirical accuracy" in fragments and factual details. Therefore, many classicist projects in philology could be seen as "collective enterprises by scholarly lineages that spanned several generations". Disciples and children of scholars usually finished what their ancestors started. Many major conclusions are often not credited to the individual but upheld by one's entire lineage. Huang Kan, in this case, as the student of Zhang Taiyan, came from a prestigious line of scholarship along with other students of Zhang. Together, they practically dominated the field of phonology then. The marginalized scholars including Wang Li and Zhang Shilu, practiced a comparative and historical approach in phonology and their disciples continued as rivals till recent days.

Huang famously said, "I shall only write books when I reach fifty years old" (“年五十，当著书”). Huang died right around the age of fifty, so the majority of his works were only published after his death. A compilation of his major works including nineteen of his writings were published as Special Edition of Works by the Late Mr. Huang Jigang 《黄季刚先生遗著专号》 after his death. Specifically, it included "General remarks on Erya (Erya Lue Shuo, 尔雅略说), which defined and explained the importance of Erya and incorporated his comprehensive summary of past analyses of Erya, including that of Guo Pu (one of the earliest writers on Chinese ancient texts from the first century); "General remarks on Shuowen" (Shuowen Lue Shuo, 说文略说), which studied the etymology of Chinese characters and analyzed the rationale of Chinese orthography; "General remarks on Shengyun" (Shengyun Lue Shuo, 声韵略说), which elaborated on the importance of phonetics and the historical change of Chinese phonetics through the multiple versions and editions of Guangyun spread across dynasties.

=== As an educator ===
Upon returning to China after his political exile in Japan, Huang slowly withdrew from direct political involvement and focused on research and teaching. He taught at Peking University, National Central University, Jinling University, Shanxi University, and some others for more than twenty years collectively. After the collapse of the imperial Qing, many intellectuals joined the New Culture Movement started by Chen Duxiu, Hu Shih and more (mainly scholars that were educated in western countries) advocating for a new Chinese culture based on democracy and science. Consequently, the leaders of the movement decided to employ the vernacular writing style as one of the trademarks of the movement. Huang Kan, although opposing the imperialist government, did not support the New Culture movement, either. His strong classicist orientation kept him as a vehement "cultural traditionalist". In 1925, when he was the only professor in the Chinese Department at Wuchang Higher Normal, he refused to teach any classes as a protest to the school's proposal to hire left-wing poet Guo Moruo (a leader of the New Cultural Movement) as a faculty member. Eventually, Guo had to decline the invitation. Furthermore, Huang often poked fun of vernacular writing. During that time period, people communicated via telegram in long distance. He asked his students to imagine a telegram delivering the death of someone's mother. Vernacular Chinese (often disyllabic, having two syllables making up one word) would be "Your mama is dead. Come back now!" (“你妈妈死了！快回来呀！“) as opposed to the older form (often monosyllabic where individual syllables make up its own word) (literally) "Mother dead. Fast return." (“母死速回。”) The vernacular Chinese uses more characters to write and therefore, would cost more money to send as a telegram.

Huang Kan was a very famous academic during his time for both his uncompromising political stance as well as his teaching style. His lectures were often so popular that the lecture halls were filled with admirers standing by the doors and windows to listen. At Peking University, he taught "Study of Poetry and Prose" and "History of Chinese Literature". He was known to have prepared his lectures extremely extensively, often departing from textbook content and structure. He was also said to incorporate other studies and fields into his lectures. Furthermore, for students he thought as particularly talented with great potential, he held extra smaller lectures outside of class time to discuss contemporary matters and literature.

As a classicist, he was very adamant about the list of twenty-five books from classic Chinese literature that his students were required to read. Despite his strict pedagogy, all of his students were very grateful for his dedication in teaching as he often transferred knowledge of his personal methods and philosophies in studying. Outside of the classroom, he often spent time drinking and writing poetry with his students as well.

== Personal life ==
In 1903, Huang Kan first married Wang Caiheng (王采蘅) by arrangement of their parents. Although Huang went abroad to Japan two years after the marriage, within the fourteen years of their marriage, Wang bore seven children. Only three boys and two girls were still living when Wang died in 1916. She unequivocally supported Huang's political stance and teaching career and took care of their children. She was praised as a great partner. However, during the long distance marriage, Huang went to Shanghai in pursuit of Huang Shaolan (黄绍兰), who was also a student of Zhang Taiyan. He convinced her to marry him using a fake name. She complied because he could not have gotten married with the same identity twice. She regretted the decision once Huang went back to Beijing and started dating a student of his, Peng (彭, this is only a last name). Huang Shaolan's father then disowned her because of the scandal. Consequently, she suffered greatly from mental illness and eventually hung herself. Zhang Taiyan's wife, Tang Guoli (汤国梨), expressed great sympathy for Huang Shaolan and publicly detested Huang Kan's "immoral conduct" in her writings. Zhang Taiyan, on the other hand, excused his favourite student for such behavior for "any great scholar or artist cannot be perfect."

In 1923, Huang Kan married one of his own students Huang Juying(黄菊英), who graduated from college that year. He allegedly had nine marriages in total.

In 1916, when Zhang Taiyan was jailed by Yuan Shikai (a politician who attempted to restore the monarchy after Sun Yet-sen's death), Huang Kan arrived at his teaching position in Peking University. Despite the risk of being jailed and executed, Huang moved into Zhang's house arrest in Beijing to take care of his teacher. His students and peers thought him as someone who had the utmost integrity and dedication to truth and justice.

Huang Kan had ten children by different wives. His eight sons were Nianhua (念华), Nianchu (念楚, died very early), Niantian (念田), Nianxiang (念祥), Nianci (念慈), Nianqin (念勤), Nianning (念宁), Nianping (念平). He had two daughters, oldest being Shipan(适潘).

== Legacy ==
Below is a list of works by Huang kan including works that he co-authored (for more detailed information, see List of works by and about Huang Kan)

- Zhou, Jiafeng and Huang. Huang Shi Gu Yun Er Shi Ba Bu Xie Sheng Biao 黄氏古韵二十八部諧聲表. 台南縣: 私立遠東工業專科學校, 1968. Print.
- Xie, Yimin and Huang. Ji Chun Huang Shi Gu Yin Shuo 蘄春黄氏古音說,. 台北? 嘉新水泥公司文化基金會, 1965. Print.
- Wen Xuan Huang Shi Xue 文選黃氏學. 台北: 文史哲, 1977. Print.
- Literary History Lab of Hubei Province and Huang. Huang Ji Gang Shi Wen Chao 黃季剛詩文鈔. 武汉市: 湖北人民出版社 : 發行新華書店湖北發行所, 1985. Print.
- Huang, Yanzu and Huang. Huang Kan Guo Xue Wen Ji 黃侃國學文集. 北京市: 中華書局, 2006. Print.
- Huang, Zhuo, Huang, Nianhua and Huang. Zi Zheng Chu Bian 字正初编. 湖北省武昌: 武汉大学出版社 : 湖北省新华书店发行, 1983. Print.
- Huang, Zhuo, Huang, Nianhua and Huang.. Shuo Wen Jian Shi 說文箋識. 北京市: 中華書局, 2006. Print.
- Wen Xin Diao Long Zha Ji 文心雕龍札記. 北京: 中華書局 : 新華書店上海發行所發行, 1962. Print.
- Liang Shou Lu Ci Chao量守廬詞鈔. 臺北市: 國民出版社, 1960. Print.
- Huang Kan Shou Pi Bai Wen Shi San Jing黄侃手批白文十三經. 上海: 上海古籍出版社 : 新華書店上海發行所發行, 1983. Print.
- Huang Kan Lun Xue Za Zhu黄侃論學雜著. 北京: 中華書局, 1964. Print.
- Wang, Ying and Huang. Er Ya Zheng Ming Ping 爾雅正名評. 九龍: 新亞書院中文系, 1968. Print.
- Huang Kan Shou Pi Er Ya Zheng Ming黄侃手批尔雅正名. 湖北武昌: 武汉大学出版社, 1986. Print
- Xu, Shen and Huang. Huang Kan Shou Pi Shuo Wen Jie Zi 黄侃手批說文解字. 北京市: 中華書局, 2006. Print.
- Huang, Zhuo and Huang. Shuo Wen Jian Shi Si Zhong 说文箋識四種. 上海: 上海古籍出版社 : 新華書店上海發行所發行, 1983. Print.
- Huang, Zhuo and Huang. Guang Yun Jiao Lu 廣韵校錄. 上海: 上海古籍出版社 : 新華書店上海发行所发行, 1985. Print.
- Wen Zi Sheng Yun Xun Gu Bi Ji 文字聲韻训詁筆记. 上海: 上海古籍出版社 : 新華書店上海發行所發行, 1983. Print.
- Wen Xuan Ping Dian 文選平點. 上海: 上海古籍出版社 : 新華書店上海發行所發行, 1985. Print.
- Er Ya Yin Xun 爾雅音訓. 上海: 上海古籍出版社 : 新華書店上海發行所發行, 1983. Print.
- Liang Shou Lu Qun Shu Jian Shi 量守廬羣書箋識. 湖北武昌珞珈山: 武汉大学出版社 : 湖北省新华书店发行, 1985. Print.
