= Chen Pucai =

Chen Pucai (Chinese: 陳普才) was the father of Chen Youliang, the founder of the short-lived Chen Han dynasty of China.
