= Yusha County =

Former county in Hubei, China

- Traditional Chinese: 玉沙縣
- Literal meaning: Jade sand County
Transcriptions
Standard Mandarin
- Hanyu Pinyin: Yùshā Xiàn

Yusha County is a former county in imperial China, which was located in present-day Hubei, and included the present-day areas of Honghu and Xiantao. Its county seat during the Song Dynasty was Xindi Town, today the county seat of Honghu. In this era the county was visited and described by several notable Song poets, such as Su Shi, Lu You and Fan Chengda.

== History ==
In 965, at the very beginning of the Northern Song Dynasty, the county was re-established in the area of today's Honghu, with its county seat at Xindi Town, which today is the county seat of Honghu. In this period, the county was dissolved and re-established several times due to flooding. During the Southern Song Dynasty, marshland areas developed and Yusha County became a "land of fish and rice". During the Song era the area was visited by notable Song poets and scholars, including Su Shi, Fan Chengda, and Lu You (who visited it three times) who remarked on its farming and bounty of fish.

During the Yuan Dynasty the county was, along with Jingling, one of the two counties making up the newly formed Mianyang Prefecture.

The area was flooded on average every once every 11 years during the Yuan Dynasty and once every 9 years during the Ming Dynasty.

== Quotations by Song poets ==
有果园甚盛,盖亦一聚之雄也。与诸子及二僧步登岸,游广福永固寺,阒然无一人。东偏白云轩前,橙方结实,虽小而极香,相与烹茶破橙。抵暮乃还舟中。华家池,盖属复州玉沙县沧浪乡云。 There was a very thriving orchard, truly a magnificent gathering place. I walked ashore with my sons and two monks, and visited Guangfu Yonggu Temple, which was deserted. To the east, in front of Baiyun Pavilion, oranges were just beginning to ripen; though small, they were extremely fragrant. We brewed tea and ate the oranges together. We returned to the boat at dusk. Huajia Pond is said to belong to Canglang Township, Yusha County, Fuzhou.

— Lu You, Weinan Anthology (渭南文集卷), Volume 47, p. 2445: Lu You's Collection, Day 7, Anchored at Zhanjiang

== See also ==
- History of Hubei
