= Mianyang Prefecture =

Prefecture in Hubei, China

- Chinese: 沔阳
Transcriptions
Standard Mandarin
- Hanyu Pinyin: Miǎnyáng

Mianyiang Prefecture (沔阳府) was a prefecture of imperial China. It was previously known as Fuzhou Route (復州路), itself the successor of the former Fu Prefecture. During the Yuan Dynasty it consisted of two counties: Yusha and Jingling. Its territory included the present-day jurisdictions of Honghu, Tianmen and Xiantao.

== History ==
During the Song Dynasty, it was called Fuzhou. In the thirteenth year of the Yuan Dynasty (1276) it became officially part of its territory. In the fifteenth year of the Yuan Dynasty (1278), Fuzhou was renamed Mianyang Prefecture, with its seat in Yusha County, under the jurisdiction of the Henan Jiangbei province. Its territory was equivalent to present-day Honghu, Tianmen and Xiantao, and other areas of present-day Hubei Province. It administered Yusha County and Jingling County. In the 27h year of the Yuan Dynasty the number of households was 17,766.

In the tenth year of the Longfeng era (1364), Zhu Yuanzhang of Wu pacified Jianghan, and Mianyang Prefecture was placed under the jurisdiction of the Huguang Province. In April of the ninth year of the Hongwu era of the Ming Dynasty (1376), Mianyang Prefecture was downgraded to Mianyang Directly Subordinate Prefecture. In December of the tenth year of the Jiajing era (1531), Mianyang Prefecture was transferred to Chengtian Prefecture (承天府).

== Geography ==
The prefecture included the following modern areas:

- Honghu
- Tianmen
- Xiantao
