= Honghu =

Honghu 洪湖市
- County-level city
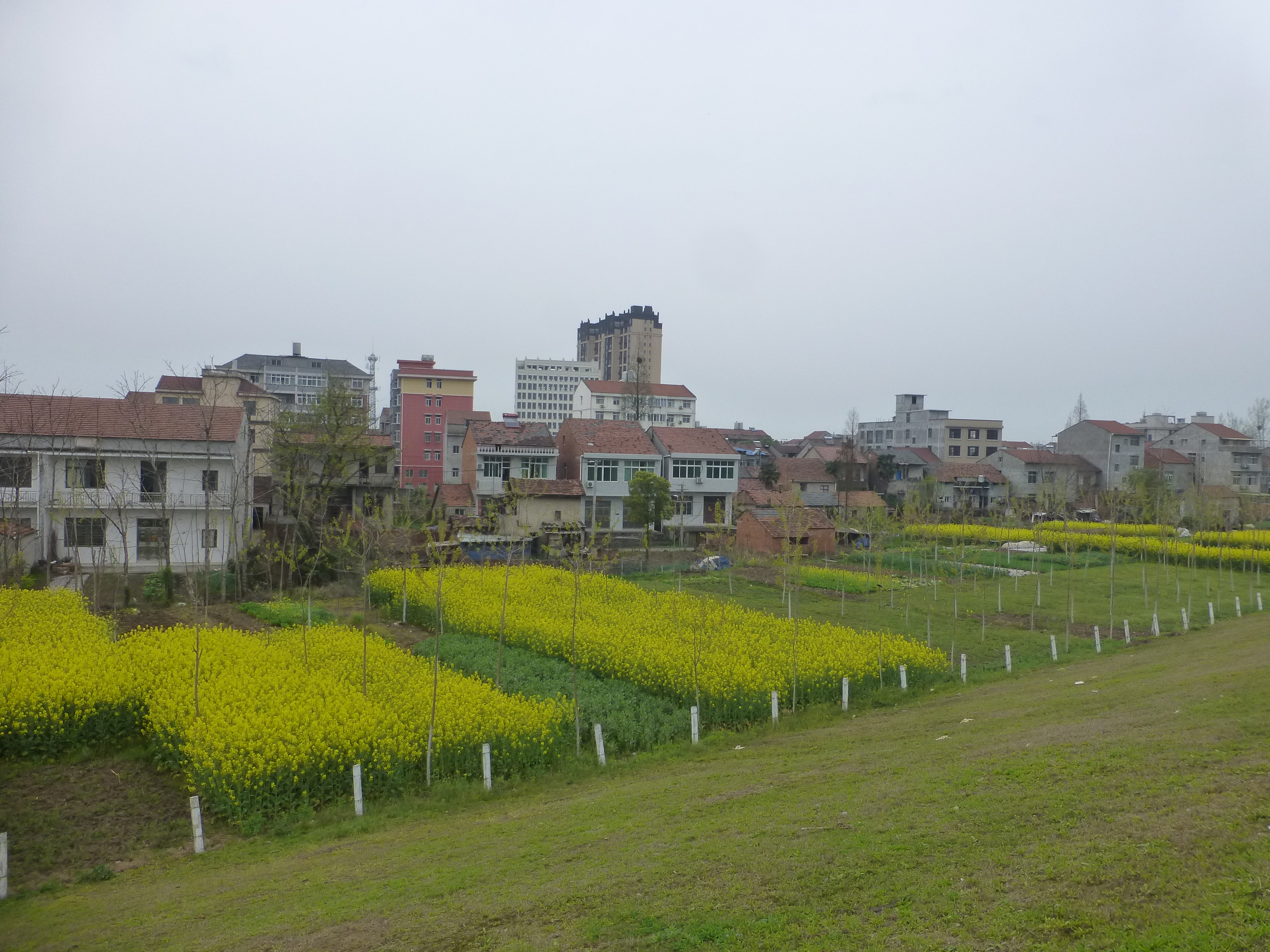
- Xintan, one of the towns of Honghu City, seen from a Yangtze levee

- Location in Hubei
- Coordinates: 29°49′37″N 113°28′34″E
- Country: People's Republic of China
- Province: Hubei
- Prefecture-level city: Jingzhou

Area
  - Urban: 41.40 km^{2} (15.98 sq mi)

Population (2020)
  - County-level city: 698,188
  - Urban: 304,073
- Time zone: UTC+8 (China Standard)
- Website: www.honghu.gov.cn

Honghu (Chinese: 洪湖市; pinyin: Hónghú Shì) is a county-level city in the municipal region of Jingzhou, in the central south of Hubei province. The city lies on the northwest (left) bank of the Yangtze River, across from Hunan Province and Xianning, Hubei. It is named after the adjacent Hong Lake.

As of 2000, Honghu City had a population of 335,618 or more people.

== History ==
=== Imperial China ===
At the beginning of the Northern Song Dynasty, Xindi Town, which is the county seat of modern Honghu, became the county seat of Yusha County, and was visited by Song poets such as Lu You.

=== Civil War ===
Honghu and other regions around its lake were part of an important communist stronghold called the Hunan-Western Hubei Revolutionary Base Area (湘鄂西革命根据地, Xiang-Exi Geming Genjudi, also called the Hunan-Western Hubei Soviet, 湘鄂西苏维埃, Xiang-Exi Suweiai). The Hunan-Western Hubei Soviet was actually a collection of several isolated bases linked together by underground and guerrilla activities. The Honghu Base, the largest, was itself the object of four Encirclement Campaigns, the last of which was strategised as one stage of the broadly successful Encirclement Campaign against Hunan-Western Hubei Soviet.

The base area or soviet was under the leadership of communist general (later Field Marshal) He Long through most of its existence, and defended by his Second Army Group. Finally crushed by Chiang Kai-shek's Chinese Army and various allied warlord forces, co-ordinated in his Encirclement Campaigns, the Soviet and its military force retreated westward to form the Hunan-Hubei-Sichuan-Guizhou revolutionary base area, which in October 1934 refuged the retreating troops of the Sixth Army Group. Folding the men of the Sixth into his ranks, He Long formed the Second Front Red Army which was to take its own route on the Long March.

=== PRC ===
==== Market Economy in the 1950s ====
In 1954, Yangtze River had a huge flood that only occurred once a century, and in order to save major cities including Wuhan, Honghu was designated as the flooded area, resulting in nearly a million local residents becoming refugees after the entire county was flooded. As the flood subsided and refugees returned to begin rebuilding, another political disaster struck the county that was already devastated by the flood: on May 5, 1955, Mao Zedong personally claimed that the time was critical for collectivization, and ordered the immediate start of collectivization, which must be completed within three years.

The local communist party secretary Mr. Li Jinyu (李金玉) (1922 - October 8, 2002) was assigned to the area in 1955 and witnessed the devastation first hand. Li strongly opposed Mao's policy and openly claimed that there must be prerequisite conditions for collectivization and Honghu had not met any of them. Instead Li convinced his colleagues to adopt an economic policy that was completely against Mao's wish - a de facto market economy (for political reasons the term could not be mentioned).

This was successful: the county fully recovered from the devastation within a year, the average industrial annual growth was 17.7%, and average agricultural annual growth was 11.3%. Li and his colleagues as well as the local population later suffered for opposing Mao. Li, anticipating this, asked the local populace to prepare by stocking grains and other foods at their homes.

==== The Great Leap Forward ====
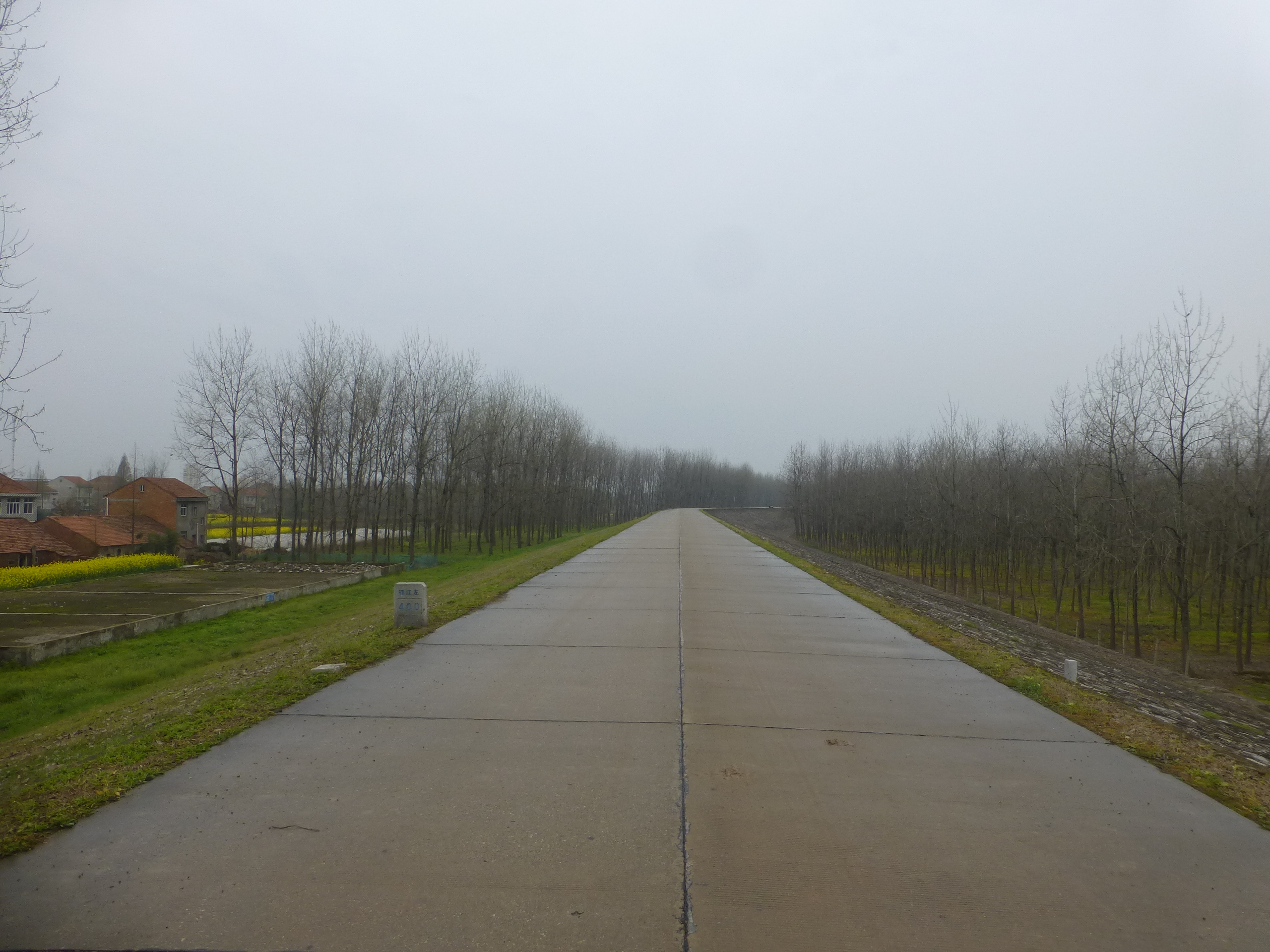
On a levee in Xintan Town, Honghu City

In accordance with Mao's Great Leap Forward, the communist party apparatus at prefecture level issued orders on July 4, 1958, to produce forty thousand tons of steel, thirty-six thousand tons of iron, and over half a million people were mobilized for this effort. Another three thousand were mobilized to logging in order to meet the fuel demand of making steel and iron. Honghu, a county belong to the prefecture could be no exception and Mr. Li Jinyu (李金玉)'s own son, Mr. Li Shutang (李树棠), a student at the time, was among those mobilized. After witnessing the furnace hastily built at his son's school, which was completely useless but still functioned due to the political reason, Mr. Li Jinyu (李金玉) only muttered one sentence: "This is a joke!", but he and his colleagues were powerless to stop the foolish policy that was issued by the Chinese paramount leader Mao Zedong. Once his son Li Shutang (李树棠) excitedly told him that there average yield of a single hactre of rice reached 100 tons, Mr. Li Jinyu (李金玉) angrily shut his son up by telling the truth: that was the total production of twenty hactres of rice put into one, the propaganda had lied.

The consequence of Mao's disastrous policy soon appeared: since June 1959, according to official records of the Chinese government, the death of local prefecture numbered 115,844 in 1960, which was more than the double of the average annual death of 50,000. The price at Honghu county skyrocketed and the number of people becoming ill due to starvation drastically increased. Mr. Li Jinyu (李金玉) and his colleague decided to save the local population totaling more than half a million from starvation, which ultimately would doom their fates.

==== The Great Chinese Famine ====
Massive death in the local Jingzhou prefecture forced the local cadres at prefecture level to gather as much grains as possible, and Honghu county, the only county in the prefecture without death caused by starvation, became their only target. The local communist party secretary of Jingzhou prefecture, Xue Tan (薛坦), asked Li Jinyu (李金玉) to leave only 13.5 kilograms (30 lb) of grains of monthly rations for each resident of Honghu, and give out the rest.

Li refused, arguing that it would at least take 15 kilograms (33 lb) of monthly ration to prevent death resulting from starvation. After much argument without any satisfactory result, Li decided to go against his superior's order and allow the local populace to have enough to eat. As a result, in an era when all other counties suffered tens of thousands of starvation deaths, Honghu county did not lose a single person to starvation, and the local population of Honghu county actually increased by 15.52‰ (or 1.552%).

==== Honghu county during Cultural Revolution ====
Mr. Li Jinyu (李金玉) and his colleagues soon paid their price for saving the local population. Even before the Cultural Revolution, the local cadres were persecuted. In October 1964, the communist apparatus at the Jingzhou prefecture level decided that the communist organization of Honghu county was completely "rotten" and Mr. Li Jinyu (李金玉) and his colleagues were struggled in public trials in front of ten thousand people. In April 1965, the charge became much more serious, the local communists of Honghu county headed by Mr. Li Jinyu (李金玉) was accused of (though accurately) being reestablishing capitalism. In February 1966, the local communists of Honghu county were accused of establishing independent kingdoms, forming reactionary anti-communism revisionist group, a serious political crime that was punishable by death. Finally, in 1966, a total of 341 cadres of Honghu county, or 90% of the county administrators and local communists in charge, including communist party secretary Mr. Li Jinyu (李金玉), first deputy communist party secretary Mr. Xu Wei (徐伟), deputy communist party secretaries Han Yaohui (韩耀辉), Ma Xiangkui (马香魁), Gu Chengqi (辜呈清, also serving as Honghu County chief at the time) and Sun Keti (孙克惕, also serving as the deputy Honghu County chief at the time) were all arrested and sent directly to labor camps without trials or any other legal proceedings, and everyone received at least ten years jail terms, with Mr. Li Jinyu (李金玉) had the longest, a fifteen-year term. The persecution had such devastation on those suffered that many, including the former deputy communist party secretary Mr. Xu Wei (徐伟) refused to be interviewed about the experience, even in the 2000s (decade), more than three decades later. The subject remains a taboo in official documents by the Chinese government until this day, but those local populace who survived the massive famine thanks to what Mr. Li Jinyu (李金玉) had done would remember him. After Mr. Li Jinyu (李金玉) had died on October 8, 2002, many of those who had experienced the famine went to his funeral to honor him, including many who could not go but insisted on being carried to the funeral.

== Administrative divisions ==
Two subdistricts:

- Xindi Subdistrict (新堤街道), Binhu Subdistrict (滨湖街道)

Fourteen towns:

- Luoshan (螺山镇), Wulin (乌林镇), Longkou (龙口镇), Yanwo (燕窝镇), Xintan (新滩镇), Fengkou (峰口镇), Caoshi (曹市镇), Fuchang (府场镇), Daijiachang (戴家场镇), Qujiawan (瞿家湾镇), Shakou (沙口镇), Wanquan (万全镇), Chahe (汊河镇), Huangjiakou (黄家口镇)

The only township is Laowan Township (老湾乡)

Three administrative zones:

- Xiaogang (小港管理区), Datonghu (大同湖管理区), Dashahu (大沙湖管理区)

== Climate ==
Climate data for Honghu, elevation 25 m (82 ft), (1991–2020 normals, extremes 1981–present)
Month	Jan	Feb	Mar	Apr	May	Jun	Jul	Aug	Sep	Oct	Nov	Dec	Year
Record high °C (°F)	22.9 (73.2)	27.4 (81.3)	32.2 (90.0)	34.6 (94.3)	35.4 (95.7)	36.9 (98.4)	38.9 (102.0)	39.2 (102.6)	39.6 (103.3)	34.0 (93.2)	30.4 (86.7)	23.8 (74.8)	39.6 (103.3)
Mean daily maximum °C (°F)	8.1 (46.6)	11.1 (52.0)	15.7 (60.3)	22.3 (72.1)	26.9 (80.4)	30.1 (86.2)	32.9 (91.2)	32.5 (90.5)	28.5 (83.3)	23.0 (73.4)	16.8 (62.2)	10.7 (51.3)	21.6 (70.8)
Daily mean °C (°F)	4.8 (40.6)	7.5 (45.5)	11.8 (53.2)	17.9 (64.2)	22.7 (72.9)	26.3 (79.3)	29.2 (84.6)	28.6 (83.5)	24.4 (75.9)	18.9 (66.0)	12.8 (55.0)	7.0 (44.6)	17.7 (63.8)
Mean daily minimum °C (°F)	2.2 (36.0)	4.7 (40.5)	8.7 (47.7)	14.5 (58.1)	19.4 (66.9)	23.3 (73.9)	26.3 (79.3)	25.7 (78.3)	21.4 (70.5)	15.7 (60.3)	9.8 (49.6)	4.3 (39.7)	14.7 (58.4)
Record low °C (°F)	−7.3 (18.9)	−5.1 (22.8)	−1.2 (29.8)	2.5 (36.5)	9.4 (48.9)	13.2 (55.8)	20.2 (68.4)	18.3 (64.9)	10.6 (51.1)	3.7 (38.7)	−2.3 (27.9)	−7.9 (17.8)	−7.9 (17.8)
Average precipitation mm (inches)	61.7 (2.43)	77.5 (3.05)	114.7 (4.52)	171.0 (6.73)	190.7 (7.51)	225.9 (8.89)	208.4 (8.20)	120.4 (4.74)	65.8 (2.59)	78.0 (3.07)	69.0 (2.72)	36.2 (1.43)	1,419.3 (55.88)
Average precipitation days (≥ 0.1 mm)	11.0	11.6	14.7	13.2	13.1	13.0	10.6	8.8	7.9	9.6	9.6	8.2	131.3
Average snowy days	4.3	2.5	0.8	0	0	0	0	0	0	0	0.2	1.4	9.2
Average relative humidity (%)	79	78	79	77	77	80	77	78	77	77	78	76	78
Mean monthly sunshine hours	95.1	92.2	119.5	148.3	168.7	163.6	227.3	224.7	169.5	153.3	133.6	120.0	1,815.8
Percentage possible sunshine	29	29	32	38	40	39	53	55	46	44	42	38	40
Source: China Meteorological Administration all-time extreme temperature

== Revolutionary opera ==
The Red Guards on Honghu Lake

The scenic Lake Honghu was the centerpiece of a revolutionary opera: "The Red Guards on Honghu Lake" (洪湖赤卫队) which was based on a true story about the Red Army and its struggle with the Kuomintang (KMT) in the Chinese Civil War.

A synopsis of this story which happened on Lake Honghu:

Modern Opera. A revolutionary musical depicting the struggle between Communist guerrillas and a KMT landlord for control of a village. In the summer of 1930, a tyrant named Peng allied with Nationalist Army commander Feng raids the Red Army’s base in the Honghu area of Hubei province. Party Secretary Han Ying and the base director lead the local guards in an orderly withdrawal but later return to lead a raid on the enemy’s weapons storehouse. In retaliation, Peng has some local people tortured to try to discover Han Ying’s hideout. In order to protect his fellow villagers, Han Ying gives herself up, then escapes, with one of his deputies sacrificing himself in the effort. Han continues to lead the Red Guards in their struggle against the enemy.

— catalog entry for the 1961 film in the University of Chicago Film Library collection

== Notable people ==
- Chen Youliang (陳友諒; 1320–1363), fisherman and leader of a peasant rebellion during the Yuan Dynasty, founder of the Chen Han dynasty
- Liu Shen (劉㴱; 1412–?), Ming Dynasty jinshi and politician
- Fu Yi (傅颐; 1512–1593), Ming Dynasty writer and official
- Chen Wenzhu (陈文烛; 1525–1595), Ming dynasty writer and official
- Wang Baixin (王柏心; 1799–1873), Qing Dynasty writer
- Liu Xinyuan (劉心源; 1848–1915), Qing Dynasty calligrapher
- Tang Keming (唐克明; 1880–1933), general of the Republic of China
- Cai Hanqing (蔡漢卿; 1882–1952), revolutionary and politician of the Republic of China
- Yeh Hsieh-chin (葉叶琹; 1911–2015), politician
- Liu Shousong (刘绶松; 1912–1969), literary historian
- Yang Xiushan (杨秀山; 1914–2002), lieutenant general of the People's Liberation Army
- Huang Xinting (黄新廷; 1913–2006), lieutenant general of the People's Liberation Army
- Wang Huayong (王华勇; born 1955), vice admiral of the People's Liberation Army Navy
- Frank Hu (胡丙长; born 1966), professor
