= Chuanqi Huangdi Zhu Yuanzhang =

2006 Chinese television series

- Promotional poster
- Also known as: Zhu Yuanzhang Huanxiang
- 传奇皇帝朱元璋 / 朱元璋还乡
- Genre: Historical drama
- Screenplay by: Zhang Xiaotian
- Directed by: Li Qiankuan; Xiao Guiyun
- Starring: Chen Baoguo; Xu Fan
- Opening theme: "Ask Heaven in Jiangnan During the Third Month" (江南三月可问天)
- Ending theme: "Worldly Matters Are Unpredictable" (世事难料) / "The People Have the Final Say" (天下百姓说了算)
- Country of origin: China
- Original language: Mandarin
- No. of episodes: 50

Production
- Executive producers: Liu Dehong; Song Zhenshan
- Producer: Han Sanping
- Production location: China
- Running time: ≈45 minutes per episode
- Production companies: China Film Group Corporation; China International Television Corporation; China Radio, Film & Television Programs Exchanging Centre; Beijing HualuBaina Film & TV

Original release
- Network: CCTV
- Release: 22 September 2006

Chuanqi Huangdi Zhu Yuanzhang (传奇皇帝朱元璋; The Legendary Emperor Zhu Yuanzhang), also known as Zhu Yuanzhang Huanxiang (朱元璋还乡; Zhu Yuanzhang Returns Home), is a Chinese historical television series based on the life of Zhu Yuanzhang (also known as the Hongwu Emperor), the founding emperor of the Ming dynasty. Starring Chen Baoguo as the titular character, the series was first broadcast on CCTV in mainland China in 2006.

== Synopsis ==
In 1382, Zhu Yuanzhang, the Hongwu Emperor, and his wife Empress Ma return to his hometown in Fengyang and visit the Huangjue Temple. He recalls his early life and the events that led to him becoming the emperor.

In his youth, Zhu was a novice monk at the temple. Famine and war forced him to leave and spend the next few years roaming around as a beggar. Seeing the chaos towards the end of the Yuan dynasty as an opportunity, he joined a rebel army led by Guo Zixing. He saved Guo from the bandit Zhao Junyong, and married Guo's foster daughter Ma Xiuying. Later, he proved himself in battle and attracts more followers. At one point, Guo became suspicious of Zhu's growing influence and relieved him of his command, but Zhu responded with restraint and regained Guo's trust. After Guo died, Zhu took charge of the rebel army and further expanded his power by recruiting more capable men to join him.

When the rebel forces of Chen Youliang and Zhang Shicheng were fighting over southern China, Zhu led his forces through Jiangnan to conquer the territories across the Yangtze River. He publicly acknowledged his mistake by erecting a memorial after mistakenly executing the scholar Su Tanmei, and gained the support of notable scholars. Heeding his followers' advice to consolidate power before declaring himself a ruler, Zhu outwardly pledged allegiance to the Red Turban rebel leader Little Ming Prince while continuing to expand his forces and territories.

With Liu Bowen's guidance, Zhu eventually defeated Chen Youliang and Zhang Shicheng. He then arranged the death of Little Ming Prince, eliminating the final hurdle to his claim to sovereignty. He then declared himself emperor and established the Ming dynasty in 1368.

In the early part of his reign, Zhu attempted to restore order through strict laws, tax reductions, the revival of the imperial examination system, and harsh punishments for corruption. He also travelled incognito to assess local conditions and presented himself as an emperor concerned with the commoners' welfare. As time passed, Zhu became increasingly autocratic and violent. Although he respects his wife for her virtue and judgment, his attachment to her contributes to further brutality, especially when he ordered the massacre of people who had allegedly insulted her.

In the later part of his rule, Zhu becomes increasingly suspicious of plots to overthrow him. He destroys the memorial he erected, establishes a secret police, and intensifies political and literary persecution. His opponents are accused of treason, arrested and executed along with their supporters. By the end of his reign, Zhu has eliminated most of the men who had helped him become the emperor. Although his purges secured his control over the government, they leave him isolated, fearful and burdened by the weight of maintaining his power.

== Cast ==
- Chen Baoguo as Zhu Yuanzhang
- Xu Fan as Ma Xiuying
- Tang Guoqiang as Guo Zixing
- Zeng Li as Guo Ninglian
- Zhao Jing as Lady Zhang
- Ma Yue as Li Xingfang
- Wu Yun as Concubine Li
- Hou Tianlai as Hu Weiyong
- Jiang Hua as Li Shanchang
- Pan Yueming as Zhu Biao
- Deng Ying as Chu Fangyu
- Kadi Linna as Dalan
- Bian Xiaoxiao as Guo Hui
- Lin Ke as Yunqi
- Li Jiacun as Qian Wansan
- Jiang Chao as Qian Da
- Zhao Wanyi as Jin Ju
- Du Zhenqing as Liao Yongzhong
- Hong Tao as Liu Bowen
- Shi Weijian as Song Lian
- Li Hanjun as Lan Yu
- Shi Xianfu as Wang Guangyang
- Wang Mingzhi as Yang Xian
- Li Qiankuan as Zhang Yi
- Xin Jing as Foxing
- Pan Yuchen as Su Tanmei
- Lu Yujie as Xu Da
- Zhang Xingzhe as Tang He
- Wang Janeen as Zhu Wenzheng
- Jiang Tailang as Zhu Yunwen
- Yan Pei as Feng Guoyong
- Li Shiji as Lu Zhongheng
- Gao Yuan as Zhu Di
- Zhang Bing as Zhu Zi
- Liu Tingyao as Guo Shanfu
- Zhang Lin as Chang Yuchun
- Liu Xiaobao as Chen Ning
- Liu Kan as Zhu Dong
- Zhou Hang as Mu Ying
- Chen Yu as Zhu Wenzhong
- Xu Lianshun as Deng Yu
- Zhao Le as Hu Dahai
- Yu Le as Hu Zheng
- Sun Xiuda as Hu Tingrui
- Li Qingxiang as Chen Youliang
- Zhang Honglin as Ruwu
- Ji Peng as Yang Xisheng
- Li Xuejun as Fei Ju
- Liu Hequn as Li Cunyi
- Wu Zizheng as Ma Er
- Wang Shijun as Liu Sanwu
- Li Shide as Physician Ma
- Shi Hang as Zhang Ziming

== See also ==
- Founding Emperor of Ming Dynasty
