= Founding Emperor of Ming Dynasty =

Chinese television series

- DVD cover art
- Also known as: Zhu Yuanzhang
- 朱元璋
- Genre: Historical drama
- Screenplay by: Zhu Sujin
- Directed by: Feng Xiaoning
- Starring: Hu Jun; Ju Xue; Yin Guohua; Zheng Xiaoning
- Opening theme: "Ask Not a Hero's Background" (英雄莫问出身) by Zhi Yu
- Ending theme: "We Were Friends in Childhood" (童年我们是朋友) by Liu Yanyan
- Composer: Li Ge
- Country of origin: China
- Original language: Mandarin
- No. of episodes: 46

Production
- Executive producers: Yang Yubing; Fang Quanning
- Producer: Feng Xiaoning
- Production location: Hengdian World Studios
- Cinematography: Feng Xiaoning; Zheng Jie; Feng Feng
- Editors: Feng Xiaoning; Shen Lei
- Running time: ≈45 minutes per episode
- Production companies: Shanghai Three Nine Culture Development; China International Television Corporation

Original release
- Network: CCTV

Founding Emperor of Ming Dynasty (朱元璋) is a Chinese historical television series based on the life of Zhu Yuanzhang, the founding emperor of the Ming dynasty. Directed by Feng Xiaoning and starring Hu Jun as the titular character, the series was first aired on CCTV in China in 2006.

== Synopsis ==
Turmoil engulfs China in the final years of the Yuan dynasty as the government weakens due to corruption while rebel forces sprout throughout the land to overthrow the regime. Somewhere in the wilderness, a young cowherd named Zhu Chongba stands on a huge rock and proclaims to his friends, "I, Emperor Zhu, will reward each of you with a large piece of rice cake when I ascend the throne one day!" Around the same time, his parents die of starvation at home.

To give his parents a proper funeral, Zhu becomes a novice monk at a monastery and spends part of his childhood there. A few years later, the monastery is destroyed so he has no choice but to become a beggar. One day, he encounters Yuan soldiers and narrowly escapes death, but is captured by some rebels, who suspect that he is a spy and want to kill him. At this critical moment, he is saved by a girl, and he joins Guo Zixing's rebel army later.

Zhu Chongba proves his capability on the battlefield and earns the favour of Guo Zixing. Guo Zixing gives Zhu Chongba a new name, Zhu Yuanzhang, and arranges for his goddaughter, Lady Ma, to marry Zhu. From then on, Zhu Yuanzhang starts his journey towards becoming the emperor. He gains the support of talented men such as Xu Da, Chang Yuchun, Lan Yu, Li Shanchang and Liu Bowen, triumphs over his nemesis Chen Youliang at the Battle of Lake Poyang, overthrows the Yuan dynasty, and establishes the Ming dynasty.

Zhu Yuanzhang's reign marks the beginning of a golden era for China. He implements land reforms to prevent peasants from being abused by wealthy landlords and bureaucrats; harshly punishes officials found guilty of corruption; drafts the Great Ming Code; introduces policies to help China recover from years of war. At the same time, he also uses ruthless and brutal means to consolidate power: he kills some of his subjects who contributed greatly to the founding of the Ming dynasty out of fear that they would rebel against him.

== Cast ==
- Hu Jun as Zhu Yuanzhang
  - Zhou Ti as Zhu Yuanzhang (teenager)
- Ju Xue as Empress Ma
- Yin Guohua as Hu Weiyong
- Zheng Xiaoning as Liu Bowen
- Chen Changhai as Li Shanchang
- Ebusi Yonglin as Xu Da
- Yang Hongwu as Tang He
- Hou Xiangling as Zhu Biao
- Zhou Zhengbo as Yang Xian
- Qian Yifei as Song Lian
- Xu Shouxin as Lü Xu
- Zeng Ang as Lan Yu
- Li Haifeng as Chang Yuchun
- Yao Changjiang as Erhu
- Bobo Gan as Yu'er
- Chen Ming as Liu Lian
- Wang Yuzhang as Guo Zixing
- Lü Yiding as Guo Tianxu
- Bao Depan as Sun Deya
- Li Ming as Chen Youliang
- Yao Yuxing as Chen Li
- Gao Huailiang as Zhang Shicheng
- Li Jieni as Han Lin'er
- Tu Men as Toqto'a
- Liu Dong as Dahu
- Zhou Yang as Li Jin
- Zheng Jie as Wu Feng
- Ren Suyun as Ma Sandao
- Ran Weiqun as Lu Mingyi
- Gao Sen as Master Peng
- Yang Si as Qian'er
- Zhang Xueying as Qing'er (Xiaoqing)
- Zhou Junhao as Zhu Yunwen
- Qian Lin as Zhu Di

== Releases ==
The series was released in Japan under the title 大明帝国朱元璋 in a three box DVD set.

== See also ==
- Chuanqi Huangdi Zhu Yuanzhang
