= Four Major Cases of the early Ming dynasty =

Executions by Zhu Yuanzhang, 1375 to 1390

The Four Major Cases of the early Ming dynasty (Chinese: 明初四大案; pinyin: Míngchū Sìdà'àn / Chinese: 明初四大獄; pinyin: Míngchū Sìdàyù) refer to the following mass executions and persecutions perpetrated by the Hongwu Emperor (Zhu Yuanzhang) at the start of the Ming dynasty:

- Hu Weiyong case (Chinese: 胡惟庸案; pinyin: Hú Wéiyōng àn): resulted in the executions and deaths of Hu Weiyong, Li Shanchang, Liu Bowen and 30,000 other Chinese people
- Lan Yu case (Chinese: 藍玉案; pinyin: Lán Yù àn): resulted in the execution of Lan Yu and 15,000 other Chinese people,
- the prestamped documents case (Chinese: 空印案; pinyin: Kōngyìn àn),
- the Guo Huan case (Chinese: 郭桓案; pinyin: Guō Huán àn).

As they occurred during the reign of the Hongwu Emperor, they were also called the Four Major Cases of the Hongwu era (Chinese: 洪武四大案; pinyin: Hóngwǔ Sìdà'àn / Chinese: 洪武四大獄; pinyin: Hóngwǔ Sìdàyù).

They are bracketed together as practices of the emperor's key idea: ruling with severe punishment. Each case, except the prestamped documents case, led to large numbers of people being involved, and consequently, tens of thousands of executions.

Traditionally, Chinese historians grouped these cases into the Hu-Lan cases (Chinese: 胡藍之獄; pinyin: Hú Lán Zhīyù / Chinese: 胡藍黨獄; pinyin: Hú Lán Dǎngyù), combining the former two cases against the meritorious officials and officers of the Hu-Lan cliques, while the targets of the rest were common officials.

== Background ==
=== Shao Rong and Xie Zaixing rebellions ===
Long before the Yuan dynasty collapsed, Zhu revealed his distrust of his senior generals. Zhu issued an order that their wives and children would be detained in the capital as hostages if they were fighting outside. Zhu's motive was to prevent his generals from revolting. However, this had the reverse effect. Shao Rong (邵榮), who was deemed the most skillful general in battle, was sentenced to death for his part in a 1362 coup attempt. Being treated unfairly, another general, Xie Zaixing (謝再興) revolted later. Both rebellions were put down eventually. Nonetheless, Zhu had huge trust issues with his officers. According to Taizu Shilu, when Zhu read History of Song in 1365, he learned from Zhao Pu's (趙普) suggestion given to Emperor Taizu of Song: remove power from generals.

=== West Huai faction and East Zhe faction ===
Since the emperor came from the middle reaches of the Huai River, he installed the figures who also came from there at the imperial court. These people formed the West Huai faction, which included Li Shanchang at first. Hu Weiyong established himself as a pivotal figure after Li's retirement. Beside this, there are some figures from Zhejiang such as Liu Ji, and their allies such as Yang Xian. As their status elevated, regionalism emerged and grew into the political struggle between the East Zhe faction and the West Huai faction. It was said that Hu spoke of his fears to Li: once Yang Xian was appointed as the chancellor, the people belonging to the West Huai faction would be emasculated and marginalised. Then they removed Yang by fair means or foul.

== Hu Weiyong case ==
Overview: execution of Hu Weiyong, Li Shanchang, and 30,000 people

Hu served as a military clerk in former years and was promoted to assistant chancellor and then the right chancellor.

In 1380, Hu Weiyong's adopted son Tu Jie (涂节) sued Hu for treason. Zhu Yuanzhang (Ming Taizu) immediately arrested Hu and executed him.

In 1390, Zhu Yuanzhang further executed Li Shanchang, Lu Zhongheng, Tang Shengzong, Fei Ju, Zhao Yong, Jin Chaoxing, Ye Sheng, Mao Qi, Li Bosheng and Ding Yu for treason and colluding with Hu. In particular, Zhu Yuanzhang executed all 70 members of Li Shanchang's family. But Zhu went further and executed 30,000 people in total.

Liu Ji poisoned by Hu Weiyong and Zhu Yuanzhang

Li Shanchang and Liu Ji were political enemies. Zhu Yuanzhang paid Liu a salary of 240 dan, but paid Li a salary of 4000 dan. Liu soon retired. Moreover, Liu once told Zhu that Hu Weiyong was not suitable to be prime minister. Hu Weiyong then hated Liu Bowen and canceled Liu's salary and pension. In 1375 when Liu fell ill, Zhu ordered Hu Weiyong to send a doctor to Liu, but Zhu and Hu Weiyong actually poisoned Liu, causing Liu to die.

Champa envoy case: execution of Wang Guangyang

In 1379, Champa envoys arrived to pay tribute. Hu Weiyong and right prime minister Wang Guangyang (汪广洋) concealed the arrival of these envoys from Zhu. When Zhu found out, he was furious and sentenced Wang and his concubines to death. Zhu then launched an investigation into Hu Weiyong and his entire department. Zhu eventually arrested Hu and six officials close to him.

Although Hu was blamed for his role in killing Liu, Zhu's main motive for attacking Hu was that Hu Weiyong made too many arbitrary decisions, killing and demoting people, without consulting Zhu or caring about the people around him. This caused Zhu to feel insecure in power, and Zhu sought to take apart Hu's monopoly and reassert imperial power.

Execution of Hu Weiyong and Tu Jie

Under the pretext of visiting a gush of divine spring at his yard, Hu invited Zhu to his residence to assassinate Zhu. The eunuch Yun Qi (云奇) stopped Zhu half-way there and gave advance warning of Hu's attempted coup. Zhu ascended the palace wall and noticed Hu's soldiers ambushed, confirming what Yun had warned. After the conspiracy was exposed, Hu was put to death.

Hu's adopted son Tu Jie surrendered and sued Hu for treason. Zhu then arrested and executed Hu Weiyong and Tu Jie for abuse of power and subverting the law. But even after Hu was killed, Zhu did not stop there, and Hu's charges continued to escalate.

Execution of Lin Xian for "Collusion with the Japanese"

After Hu was executed, in 1385 Li Cunyi (李存义) and his son Li You (李佑) were accused of collusion with Hu. In 1386, Lin Xian (林贤), commander of the Mingzhou guards, was investigated for his ties to Hu Weiyong. It turned out that Hu Weiyong sent Lin Xian to attract Japanese pirates to amass his own army of horses against Zhu. In the 19th year of Hongwu, the investigation into the "Lin Xian case" (林贤案) concluded, and Zhu Yuanzhang executed Lin Xian by lingchi for treason and collusion with Hu and the Japanese.

"Collaborate with the Mongols": Feng Ji event

In addition to asking for help from the Japanese, Hu Weiyong drafted a letter asking for help from Yuan dynasty nobles to oppose Zhu.

Execution of Li Shanchang

Zhu executed Li Shanchang and beheaded all 70 members of Li's family.

Lu Zhongheng's (陆仲亨) family slave also reported that Lu Zhongheng, Tang Shengzong (唐胜宗), Fei Ju (费聚), and Zhao Xiong (赵雄) also colluded with Hu under a plot. Song Lian's (宋濂) grandson Song Shen (宋慎) was also implicated and killed, while Song Lian was demoted. From this incident, Zhu Yuanzhang published the "Records of Exposing Traitors" (《昭示奸党录》).

== Lan Yu case ==
In the 25th year of Hongwu, Ye Sheng (叶昇), Marquis of Jingning (靖寧侯), was executed for "communicating with Hu Weiyong". Ye Sheng was an in-law of Lan Yu, so Ye Sheng's execution served as a prelude to the Lan Yu case in the 26th year of Hongwu. Zhu Yuanzhang would reopen the prison and persecute over 100,000 people.

Lan Yu was a talented general who led an army of 150,000 people to pursue the Mongolians to Buir Lake. Lan Yu succeeded in defeating the Mongols and even captured a Mongol noble lady and raped her. Despite this, Lan Yu was initially praised by Zhu for his battles against the Mongols. However, this started to change as Lan Yu became more arrogant and started abusing his power, making Zhu feel threatened.

Lan Yu had a lot of experience in battle, whereas the emperor Zhu Yuanzhang initially started as an illiterate beggar and bumpkin who knew nothing about warfare. Lan Yu often disagreed with Zhu, disobeying his commands. Eventually, Zhu's Jinyiwei secret police officer Jiang Huan (蔣瓛) accused Lan Yu of treason, finding 10,000 Japanese swords at Lan Yu's residence. Zhu then executed Lan Yu. However, the whole purpose was for Zhu to eliminate political enemies to the throne and his successor.

Others implicated in the Lan Yu case include: Han Xun (韓勛), Marquis of Dongping (東平侯); Cao Tai (曹泰), Marquis of Xuanning (宣寧侯); Cao Xing (曹興), Marquis of Huaiyuan (懷遠侯); Cao Zhen (曹震), Marquis of Jingchuan (景川侯); Zhang Wen (張溫), Marquis of Huining (會寧侯); Zhang Yi (張翼), Marquis of Heqing (鶴慶侯); Sun Ke (孫恪), Marquis of Quanning (全寧侯); He Rong (何榮), Count of Dongguan (東莞伯); Sang Jing (桑敬), Count of Huixian (徽先伯).

== Prestamped documents case ==
The local officials in Yuan dynasty evolved a working method from which their successors had never departed, until 1376: the imperial court commanded that local governments send an official courier to report their figures about the items at year's end, with the stamped documents. The stamped documents would be cross-checked before they were submitted to the Ministry of Revenue eventually. If the figures didn't seem to tally, the courier had to return for a new stamped document to submit. To avoid traipsing from their seats to the capital, these officials decided to carry spare prestamped documents.

However, the emperor couldn't condone such a practice. He affirmed that the participants probably cashed in on it. Thus, both the officials who held the stamps and the signatories were executed. Their accessories were exiled to the frontier.

== Guo Huan case ==
Guo Huan, then Vice-minister of Revenue, was executed for embezzling seven million piculs of grain in May 1385. Among his accomplices, only a few ministers and vice-ministers had been spared, excluding Minister of Rites Zhao Mao (趙瑁), Minister of Justice Wang Huidi (王惠迪), Vice-minister (also the acting Minister) of Works Mai Zhide (麥至德). One consequence was certain: several ministries were rudderless for about three years.

Year	Minister of Personnel	Minister of Revenue	Minister of Rites	Minister of Defense	Minister of Justice	Minister of Works	Chief Senior Censors
1384	Yu Xi (余熂)	Li Shu (栗恕) → Guo Huan	Ren Ang (任昂) → Zhao Mao	Yu Lun (俞綸)	Liu Kui (劉逵) → Wang Huidi	Mai Zhide	Left: Zhan Hui (詹徽); Right: Tang Yougong (湯友恭)
1385	Yu Xi → Zhao Mao	Guo Huan → Xu Duo (徐鐸) → Ru Taisu (茹太素)	Zhao Mao	Wen Xiangqing (溫祥卿)	Wang Huidi → Tang Duo (唐鐸)	Mai Zhide → Xu Ben (徐本)	Left: Zhan Hui; Right: Tang Yougong
1386	vacant	vacant	vacant	vacant	Tang Duo	Xu Ben	Left: Zhan Hui; Right: Tang Yougong
1387	vacant	vacant	Li Yuanming (李原名)	vacant	Tang Duo	vacant	Left: Zhan Hui; Right: Tang Yougong
1388	vacant	vacant	Li Yuanming	Tang Duo	Tang Duo	vacant	Left: Zhan Hui; Right: Tang Yougong → Ling Han (淩漢)
1389	vacant	Yang Jing (楊靖)	Li Yuanming	Tang Duo → Shen Jin (沈溍)	Zhao Mian (趙勉)	Qin Kui (秦逵)	Left: Zhan Hui; Right: vacant
1390	Zhan Hui	Yang Jing → Zhao Mian	Li Yuanming	Shen Jin → Qin Kui → Ru Chang (茹瑺)	Zhao Mian → An Tong (安童) → Yang Jing	Qin Kui → Shen Jin	Left: Zhan Hui; Right: vacant

Later, the emperor's Da Gao (大誥; [Grand Pronouncement]) proclaimed that Guo and his gang had actually embezzled 24 million piculs, while the huge discrepancy between the two accounts was justified to avoid broadly-based popular suspicion.

Allegedly, many southern landlords were complicit in these crimes. They were ordered to hand over the so-called loot, driving most of them into bankruptcy. They retaliated by mobilizing public opinion against the trial judge, Wu Yong (吳庸). Zhu then executed Wu Yong, using Wu Yong as a scapegoat, when actually it was Zhu who was responsible for the wrongful deaths of many innocent people.

== List of executed people ==
The following people were executed by Zhu Yuanzhang during these incidents:

- Shao Rong
- Xie Zaixing
- Li Shanchang and all 70 members of his family (beheaded)
- Hu Weiyong
- Yang Xian
- Liu Bowen
- Wang Guangyang
- Lu Zhongheng
- Tang Shengzong
- Fei Ju
- Jin Chaoxing
- Zhao Yong
- Mao Qi
- Ye Sheng
- Li Bosheng
- Ding Yu
- Lin Xian
- Song Shen
- Guo Huan
- Zhao Mao
- Wang Huidi
- Mai Zhide
- Wu Yong
- Tu Jie

== See also ==
- Literary Inquisition
