= Ding Yu (Ming dynasty) =

Chinese general (d. 1380)

Ding Yu (Chinese: 丁玉; pinyin: Dīng Yù; ?–1380), born Ding Guozhen (simplified Chinese: 丁国珍; traditional Chinese: 丁國珍; pinyin: Dīng Guózhēn), was a Chinese military general during the early Ming dynasty. He was a native of Hezhong (河中; present-day Shanxi).

In his early years, he followed Han Lin'er (韓林兒) and served as a censor. After Lu Zhen (呂珍) seized Anfeng, Ding Yu surrendered to Zhu Yuanzhang (the future Hongwu Emperor). After that, he participated in the campaign in Pengli, served as the prefect of Jiujiang. He also led the crowd to put down the Pengze rebellion. Zhu Yuanzhang admired his military strategy, ordered Ding to concurrently serve as a commander (指揮), and changed his name to Yu. Later, he followed Fu Youde to conquer Hengzhou, served as vice commander (指揮同知) to guard Hengzhou, and later moved to defend Yongzhou.

In 1368, he was promoted to the rank of Military Commissioner-in-chief (都指揮使) and concurrently served as Assistant Administiontrator (行省參政), guarding Guangxi. In 1377, he became the Right Censor-in-chief (右御史大夫). Later, as Pingqiang General (平羌將軍), he put down the rebellion of Dong Tieli (董貼里), a native chieftain of Weimao, Sichuan. Two years later, he pacified Songzhou (松州; Songpan 松潘). At that time, the Hongwu Emperor believed that Songzhou was too mountainous and had few fields, so it was not suitable to retain. Ding Yu, however, believed that it was an important place in Western Qiang (西羌) and military facilities should not be abandoned. Therefore, the Hongwu Emperor followed his opinion. At that time, Peng Pugui (彭普貴), a native of Sichuan, rebelled, and Commander Pu Liang (普亮) was unable to quell it; later, it was suppressed by Ding Yu. The Hongwu Emperor wrote a letter praising Ding Yu and awarding him the title of Left Censor-in-chief (左御史大夫). After the army returned, he was promoted to the Left Commissioner-in-chief of the Grand Chief Military Commission (大都督府左都督). In 1380, the Hu Weiyong case occurred, and Ding Yu was later executed due to his connection to Hu Weiyong through marriage.
