= Wang Guangyang =

Ming dynasty official (died 1379)

Count Zhongqin Wang Guangyang
- 汪廣洋

Right Grand Councilor
- In office 1371–1373
- Preceded by: Xu Da
- Succeeded by: Hu Weiyong
- In office 1377–1379
- Preceded by: Hu Weiyong
- Succeeded by: Office abolished

Personal details
- Born: Unknown Gaoyou, Jiangsu
- Died: 1379
- Occupation: Statesman

Wang Guangyang (simplified Chinese: 汪广洋; traditional Chinese: 汪廣洋; pinyin: Wāng Guǎngyáng; died 1379), courtesy name Chaozong (朝宗), was a Chinese official who served as a chancellor during the reign of the Hongwu Emperor in the Ming dynasty. Serving in both the military and civil bureaucracies, he ascended as high as the position of Grand Chancellor of the Right (右丞相).

== Career ==
=== Early career ===
At the end of Yuan Dynasty, Wang Guangyang had achieved the highest ranking on the Imperial Examinations, but had failed to find employment. The rebel warlord Zhu Yuanzhang, who would go on to succeed at toppling the Yuan dynasty and reuniting China under the Ming dynasty as the Hongwu Emperor, conquered the region where Wang lived in 1355. Zhu met Wang, and the two spoke at length. Suitably impressed, Zhu recruited Wang, and appointed him as a local magistrate in his newly established Taiping fu (now Dangtu County, Anhui). After a few years rising through the ranks of civil administration, Wang was charged with managing requisitions for Chang Yuchun's military campaigns which helped establish the Ming dynasty.

Zhu Yuanzhang established a central Secretariat for handling state correspondence in 1364. He appointed Li Shanchang to manage the affairs of this bureau, with the title Grand Chancellor of the Left (左丞相). Wang Guangyang was tasked as one of his assistants. Four years later, Zhu had unified China, and was enthroned as the Hongwu Emperor of the Ming dynasty.

=== As Imperial Chancellor ===
The Hongwu Emperor struggled with trusting his close advisors, and shuffled around or eliminated his most powerful ministers with some frequency. In the third year of his reign, 1370, Li Shanchang – the most powerful and respected individual in the bureaucracy – fell ill and was unable to work, leaving the Imperial Secretariat without a manager. Wang Guangyang was in Shaanxi at the time, and was summoned to the capital to take the position Vice Chancellor of the Left (左丞) to cover Li's workload. Appointed Vice Chancellor of the Right (右丞), the junior of the two positions, was Yang Xian.

Wang Guangyang seems to have been content to allow Yang to do most of the work for both of them, as Yang was able to make decisions unilaterally. Still Yang felt jealous of Wang and resented sharing power. So Yang suggested to the censor Liu Bing (劉炳) that he should impeach Wang for "failing to uphold his mother" (奉母無狀). When Liu sent a memorial to the throne, the emperor believed it, and transferred Wang out of the capital and back to his hometown in Gaoyou. Wang had not been home in over a decade, and according to his own poetry he was not particularly unhappy about his transfer. After a second memorial from Liu later that year, Wang was ordered to remove himself all the way to distant Hainan. Li Shanchang evidently communicated to the emperor that Wang's impeachment had been orchestrated on false pretenses by Yang Xian, so the emperor had Yang executed. Wang was recalled to the capital, given his old job back, and enfeoffed as nobility. His specific title was "Loyal and Diligent Earl" (忠勳伯), with a sinecure of 360 dan.

Early the next year, Li Shanchang retired from office. His co-worker, Grand Chancellor of the Right (右丞相) Xu Da, left the capital on a military campaign. Wang Guangyang was thereupon promoted to Grand Chancellor of the Right, with Li Shanchang's associate Hu Weiyong promoted to Vice Chancellor of the Left. The two of them were solely responsible for managing the Imperial Secretariat, with the other two positions unfilled or unattended.

Wang Guangyang and Hu Weiyong sat atop the Hongwu Emperor's bureaucracy for the next two years, then Wang fell out of favour and was sent away from the capital again, this time to Guangdong Province in a position of authority. After some time, during which Hu was promoted twice, Wang returned to the capital, appointed to the lower office of Senior Censor (左御史). At one point while in this office, Wang submitted a memorial denouncing his old boss Li Shanchang, whom the emperor forgave. In 1377 Wang was promoted back to his old role of Grand Chancellor of the Right.

During his decade long tenure holding high ministerial positions in the capital, Wang seems not to have accomplished much for his government. Characterised as weak-willed and inattentive, he avoided offering any solid advice for or against the decisions of his monarch, instead just writing poetry and – according to later writings of the emperor – overindulging in drink. The Hongwu Emperor admonished him many times.

=== Hu Weiyong case ===
In 1375, Hu Weiyong convinced the emperor to allow him to poison Liu Bowen, previously a close advisor and successful strategist, who had made himself Hu's opponent at court. The censor Tu Jie (塗節), not knowing of the emperor's approval of the murder, reported Hu Weiyong in December 1379, with the addendum that Wang Guangyang should have known of plot and reported Hu himself. The emperor condemned Wang to Guangnan (廣南) for the crime of forming a clique to bully others. Considering further that Wang had not reported the treachery of his co-worker Yang Xian, and that during his early career in Jiangxi he had sheltered Zhu Wenzheng (朱文正, a nephew and general of the Hongwu Emperor who had failed to respond to his summons after losing an important battle and being slandered as disloyal during the Ming conquest of Yuan), the emperor executed Wang Guangyang as part of the Hu Weiyong case. A decade after Wang's death, numerous associates of Li Shanchang were executed along with their family members by the Hongwu Emperor. Surviving members of Wang Guangyang's family were among them.

== See also ==
- Liu Bowen
- Yang Xian
- Hu Weiyong
- Four Major Cases of the early Ming dynasty
