= Zhao Mao =

Ming dynasty official (d. 1385)

Zhao Mao (赵瑁; died 1385), courtesy name Jun'li (君禮), a native of Yiyang, Henan, was a Chinese official who served as minister of rites during the reign of the Hongwu Emperor in the Ming dynasty. In March 1385, the censor Yu Min (余敏) reported Guo Huan (郭桓) for corruption; Zhao Mao was implicated and subsequently executed.

== See also ==
- Song Shen
- Zhao Yong (general)
