= Mao Gui =

Chinese rebel and warlord

- Born: Liaodong Peninsula
- Died: April/May 1359; Shandong
- Military career
- Allegiance: Song state of Han Lin'er
- Service years: ?–1359
- Rank: Administrator of Yidu Branch Secretariat (self-proclaimed)
- Commands: Shandong branch of the Song forces
- Conflicts: Red Turban Rebellion

Mao Gui (died 1359) was a Chinese military general who fought for the rebel Song state of Han Lin'er during the Red Turban Rebellion. One of the most successful Song commanders, he conquered much of Shandong and established himself as local administrator, ruling fairly effectively. Mao subsequently led a major albeit unsuccessful offensive against the Yuan dynasty's capital Dadu. After suffering some military setbacks, he was murdered by another rebel commander, causing his territory to disintegrate amid insurgent infighting and Yuan counter-attacks.

== Life ==
A native of the Liaodong Peninsula, Mao joined the anti-Yuan uprising of the Red Turbans, becoming a subordinate commander of the Song state established by Han Lin'er and Liu Futong. He rose to prominence while leading rebel forces in the Jianghuai area and played a major role in the capture of the important city Huai'an in 1356.

In the second lunar month (c. February/March) of 1357, Mao Gui's army was driven back by the Yuan military. To escape the pursuers, his forces embarked onto ships at Haizhou, possibly captured vessels of the Yuan fleet. The rebels subsequently sailed northward along the well-established coastal trading route, eventually landing at Jiazhou on the Shandong Peninsula. From Jiazhou, Mao led his forces to capture much of Shandong in 1358: He initially captured the important city of Yidu whose Mongol prince abandoned the area in exchange for safe passage, making it the new rebel base. He also overran the more heavily defended city of Jinan in the second lunar month. In general, the local resistance was fairly uneven, and many pro-Yuan militias either fled or defected to Mao's army. Mao managed to occupy Shandong up to the Great Canal to the west. His conquests overlapped with successful Song military operations by other insurgent commanders.

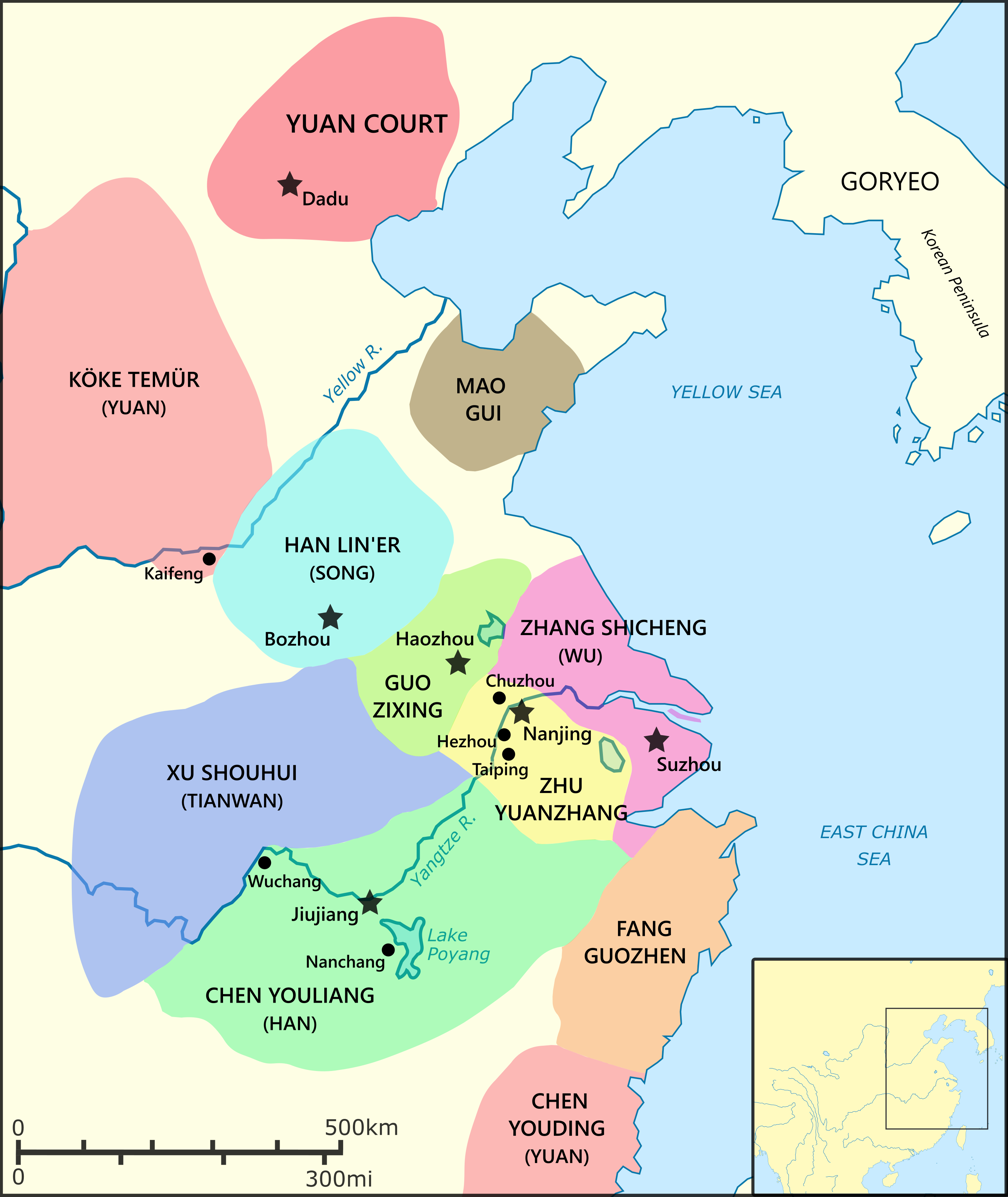
Major powers in China during the late Yuan dynasty, c. 1350–1360, with the territory controlled by Mao Gui being marked in brown. Subordinate officers of Mao also held the Liaodong Peninsula to the north, not marked on this map.

Once he had consolidated his territory in Shandong, Mao made a genuine effort to set up an effective civil administration. He appointed himself as "Administrator of Yidu Branch Secretariat" for the Song state and created a local government, recruited former Yuan officials, set up 360 military-agricultural colonies, improved transportation and the area's city walls, and collected land taxes.

In the third lunar month of 1358, Mao began a northward campaign toward the Yuan capital of Dadu (present-day Beijing). This offensive had been ordered by Liu Futong, and was part of the wider Song efforts to conquer northern China. Mao's offensive initially proceeded well and his force got close to the enemy capital. Though there was panic among the Yuan leadership and even discussions of abandoning Dadu, Mao did not advance so quickly as to fully exploit his opponents' disorder. As a result, some Yuan officials and officers managed to rally their forces, strengthen the capital's defenses, and inflict defeats on Mao's army south of Dadu. In response, he decided to retreat back to Shandong, though some of his subordinate officers including Xu Jizu managed to entrench themselves east of Dadu, mainly on the Liaodong Peninsula and in Manchuria. As other Song offensives also failed around this time, the Yuan armies regained the initiative and launched counter-offensives which drove back the rebels across northern and central China.

In the fourth lunar month (c. April/May) of 1359, a nominally superior Song commander, Zhao Junyong (趙均用), arrived at Mao's headquarters. For unclear reasons, Zhao murdered Mao and took command of the area, only to be killed in revenge by Mao's lieutenants led by Xu Jizu three months later. The infighting of the Song forces in Shandong eased the then-ongoing Yuan offensives, resulting in the peninsula being retaken by Chaghan Temur and Köke Temür during a campaign in 1360–61.

== Assessment ==
After Mao captured Yidu in 1358, a local, elderly Yuan loyalist named Wang Ying starved himself to death to protest against the new regime. This was a fairly rare example of local loyalty to the Yuan dynasty, and Mao respectfully sent the Wang family a coffin and a burial shroud to honor the deceased man's firm stance. According to David M. Robinson, this was an attempt to garner local support "through public praise of moral examplars". In general, Mao made greater efforts to properly govern and organize his territory than many other Red Turban rebels, including his superiors Han Lin'er and Liu Futong. Historians Luther Carrington Goodrich and Fang Chao-ying assessed Mao as one of the most competent administrators of the Song state alongside Zhu Yuanzhang, the later founder of the Ming dynasty. In contrast, the Song's central administration under Liu was large but inefficient.
