= Hu Mei (Ming dynasty) =

Chinese military general (d. 1384)

Hu Mei (胡美) (died 1384), originally name Tingrui (廷瑞), later changed his name to avoid Zhu Yuanzhang's courtesy name, a native of Xiantao, Henan Jiangbei province (present-day Xiantao, Hubei), was a Chinese military general of the Ming dynasty.

He first served Chen Youliang and served as Chancellor of Jiangxi Province (江西行省丞相), guarding Longxing. Zhu Yuanzhang captured Jiangzhou and sent an envoy to persuade Hu Mei to surrender. Hu Mei sent Zheng Renjie (鄭仁傑) to ask for surrender, but he requested that his troops not be disbanded. Zhu Yuanzhang was initially faced with a difficult choice, then Liu Ji suggested it and Zhu wrote a letter to explain it. In the end, Hu Mei led the crowd to request surrender, but Zhu Yuanzhang still allowed him to retain his old post. After Hu Mei surrendered, his subordinates Kang Tai (康泰) and Zhu Zong (祝宗) still refused to surrender and rebelled, capturing Hongdu. Xu Da put down the rebellion, but Zhu Yuanzhang refused to kill Kang Tai because he was Hu Mei's nephew. After that, Hu Mei captured Wuchang, and with Xu Da and others, he captured Huaidong, attacked Zhang Shicheng, successively capturing Huzhou, Pingjiang, Wuxi, and other places, and persuaded Mo Tianyou (莫天祐) to surrender.

Later, he became the "General Who Conquered the South" (征南將軍). He invaded Fujian and successively captured Shangguan (杉關), Guangze (光澤), Shaowu, Jianyang, Jianning, Fuzhou, Yanping, and Xinghua (興化). He stayed in Fujian before being recalled. Later, he was appointed to the positions of Manager of the Central Secretariat (中書平章) and Associate Administrator of the Household (同知詹事院事) and was granted the titles of Marquis of Yuzhang (豫章侯) and Marquis of Linchuan (臨川侯).

Later, during the Hu Weiyong case, Hu Mei was forced to commit suicide due to his eldest daughter, who was a Noble Consort, his son, and his son-in-law being convicted of debauchery in the imperial palace. His son and son-in-law were also sentenced to death.
