= Liu Futong =

Late Yuan dynasty rebel (died 1363)

Liu Futong (simplified Chinese: 刘福通; traditional Chinese: 劉福通; pinyin: Liú Fútōng; 1321–1363) was a leader of the Red Turban Rebellion during the late Yuan dynasty of China. He had a major presence in northern China and was killed by Zhang Shicheng in 1363.

== Life ==
Liu Futong was recruited by the northern Chinese White Lotus sectarian leader Han Shantong in 1351. Earlier that year, the Yuan official Toqto'a had mobilized 150,000 poor farmers to redirect the Yellow River. Though the project was ultimately successful, it provided a surplus of disgruntled workers in northern China. Liu Futong successfully recruited many of these workers to the Red Turban Rebellion; this resulted in a massive increase in rebel activity from 1351 onwards. After Han Shantong was captured and executed by Yuan forces, his son, Han Lin'er, escaped with Liu Futong to Yingzhou where Liu established a base of operations. Liu conquered southern Henan in 1352.

Han Lin'er was proclaimed emperor of the restored Song dynasty in March 1355. Though a figurehead, Han's legitimacy as Song emperor (and Liu's personal ideological adherence to the White Lotus sect) helped maintain cohesion amongst the Northern Red Turbans, something which their Southern counterparts lacked. Liu Futong's success as a leader was otherwise mixed. His army captured Kaifeng, the first capital of the Song dynasty, in June 1358 before making it the new capital. This led to a surge of support that allowed Liu to raid Shaanxi and Shanxi, capture parts of Anhui and Shandong, and send his general, Mao Gui, on an expedition to the Yuan capital, Dadu.

== Downfall and death ==
Liu Futong's success was short-lived, however, and Yuan commander Chaghan Temur recaptured Kaifeng in September 1359. Chaghan pushed Liu first to Yingzhou, then to Bozhou, then to Anfeng. This effectively ended the expansionist phase of the Northern Red Turbans. They would, with the exception of Zhu Yuanzhang (the future founder of the Ming dynasty), completely disappear by 1362. Zhu held nominal allegiance to Han Lin'er's Song regime. Thus, after rebel leader Zhang Shicheng's general Lü Zhen captured Anfeng and killed Liu Futong in February 1363, Zhu Yuanzhang and his general, Xu Da, rescued Han Lin'er in March. This rescue attempt was seriously risky because Zhu Yuanzhang was fighting his main rival, Chen Youliang, at the same time, but historian Frederick W. Mote says that the campaign was necessary for maintaining cohesion amongst Zhu's generals.
