= Chao Yung =

Chao Yung may refer to:

- Chinese cruiser Chaoyong
- Zhao Yong (disambiguation)
