= Zhao Yong =

Zhao Yong is the atonal pinyin romanization of the Mandarin pronunciation of various Chinese names.

It may refer to:

- Zhao Yong (king) (趙雍; d. 295 BC), a king of Zhao, posthumously known as its Wuling King
- Zhao Ang (趙昂; fl. 210s), Cao Wei official, possibly erroneously recorded as Zhao Yong
- Zhao Yong (painter) (趙雍; 1289 – c. 1360), a painter during the Yuan dynasty
- Zhao Yong (general) (赵庸), a general during the Ming dynasty
- Zhao Yong (politician) (赵勇; b. 1963), a politician in Hebei, China
