= Yang Xian (Ming dynasty) =

Chinese official

Yang Xian 楊憲
- Born: 1321; Yangqu, Taiyuan (present-day Taiyuan, Shanxi, China)
- Died: 1370 (aged 48–49)
- Occupation: Statesman

Yang Xian (simplified Chinese: 杨宪; traditional Chinese: 楊憲; pinyin: Yáng Xiàn; 1321–1370), born Yang Bi (simplified Chinese: 杨毕; traditional Chinese: 楊畢; pinyin: Yáng Bì), courtesy name Xiwu (Chinese: 希武; pinyin: Xīwǔ), was a Chinese official of the Ming dynasty, part of the East Zhe (Zhedong) faction (Liu Ji).

In 1356, Zhu Yuanzhang seized Jiankang (present-day Nanjing), and Yang Xian joined him and took charge of the documents. He also accused Zhang Chang (張昶) of cherishing the Yuan dynasty, which was highly valued by Zhu Yuanzhang.

In 1368, he was appointed as the Assistant Administrator of the Imperial Secretariat (參知政事). The following year, he was promoted to the position of Vice Chancellor of the Right (右丞) and given the name Yang Xian. During his tenure, he impeached Vice Chancellor of the Left, Wang Guangyang, for "failing to uphold his mother" (奉母無狀). Yang Xian was known for his acute personality. Hu Weiyong once said to Li Shanchang, "If Yang Xian were to become Grand Chancellor, we Huai people would not be able to become high officials".

In 1370, he was appointed Vice Chancellor of the Left (左丞). Later, Li Shanchang impeached him for "bringing false charges against a minister" (排陷大臣) and "acting wantonly as a traitor" (放肆為奸), and he was killed.

Yang Xian and Liu Ji were close friends, and Yang Xian's death intensified the dispute between the East Zhe faction and the West Huai faction. After Yang Xian's death, Li Shanchang and Hu Weiyong's West Huai faction officially took control of the government.

== See also ==
- Liu Ji
- Hu Weiyong
- Li Shanchang
- Wang Guangyang
- Four Major Cases of the early Ming dynasty

Political offices
Preceded by None	Commander of Jinyiwei; Yang Xian (First)	Succeeded by Mao Xiang
