= Zhao Yong (general) =

Chinese general (14th century)

Zhao Yong (simplified Chinese: 赵庸; traditional Chinese: 趙庸; pinyin: Zhào Yōng) was a Chinese military general during the early Ming dynasty. He was a younger brother of Zhao Zhongzhong (趙仲中).

In his early years, he and his brother Zhao Zhongzhong guarded the water village, stationed troops at Chao Lake, and later surrendered to Zhu Yuanzhang. Later, he was promoted to the post of Assistant Administrator (參知政事), and together with Yu Tonghai (俞通海), Liao Yongzhong (廖永忠), and others, he attacked Kanglang Mountain and later occupied Wuchang, Luzhou, Anfeng, Huaidong, Hai'an, and Taizhou. He was promoted to Vice Chancellor of the Left (左丞) and attacked Shandong. In 1368, he concurrently served as the Crown Prince's Vice Supervisor of the Household (太子副詹事) and later followed the armies to conquer Henan, Hebei, Shanxi, and Shaanxi. He followed Chang Yuchun to pursue the Yuan emperor in the north. Later, he and Li Wenzhong (李文忠) attacked Qingyang and Yingchang. He had the greatest merits, but because he kept slaves in Yingchang privately, he could not be granted the title of duke, so he was named Marquis of Nanxiong (南雄侯). After that, he put down rebellions in Fujian and Guangdong, and more than 8,000 people were beheaded. In 1387, he and the Prince of Yan Zhu Di came out of Gubeikou and persuaded Nayir Bukha (乃兒不花) to surrender. Later, he was implicated in the Hu Weiyong case and was executed.

== See also ==
- Hu Weiyong
- Lan Yu (general)
