= Han Lin'er =

Chinese rebel leader (died 1367)

Han Lin'er 韓林兒
- Lesser King of Light
- Died: 1367
Era name and dates
- Longfeng (龍鳳): 1355–1366
- Father: Han Shantong
- Mother: Lady Yang
- Religion: White Lotus

Chinese name
- Traditional Chinese: 韓林兒
- Simplified Chinese: 韩林儿
Transcriptions
Standard Mandarin
- Hanyu Pinyin: Hán Línér

Han Lin'er (died 1367) was a figurehead of the Red Turban Rebellion during the late Yuan dynasty of China. Proclaimed emperor in 1355, he reigned in name only, as real power was initially held by his minister Liu Futong and later by Zhu Yuanzhang.

After the fall of the Song dynasty in 1279, China came under Mongol Yuan rule. Many Han people resisted, especially the White Lotus sect led by Han's father Han Shantong, who claimed descent from Emperor Huizong of Song and as an incarnation of Maitreya. He launched an uprising in 1351 but was executed in 1355. With Han Shantong's death, Liu Futong became the de facto leader of the rebellion and supported Han Lin'er, who was proclaimed emperor of the restored Song in Bozhou.

In 1357–58, Song forces occupied large parts of the North China Plain and shifted their court to Kaifeng, but were expelled by the Mongols in 1359, leaving only Jiangnan, ruled by Zhu Yuanzhang who was formally subordinate to Han, and a small base at Anfeng. In 1363, the army of another rebel state, Wu, attacked Anfeng and killed Liu Futong; Zhu rescued Han Lin'er and settled him near Nanjing. In 1367, Han drowned in the Yangtze. The following year Zhu declared himself emperor, and by 1371 he had unified most of China.

== Historical background ==
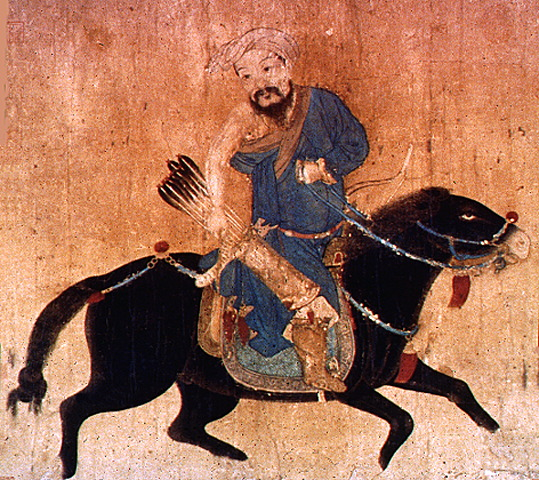
A Mongolian mounted archer depicted in a Chinese miniature from the Ming dynasty, Victoria and Albert Museum, London

In the late 13th century, a belief known as millenarianism, which combined elements of Manichaeism and Buddhism, began to spread in China. A central aspect of this belief was the expectation of the imminent arrival of a savior, referred to as the "King of Light" (Mingwang). The White Lotus sect played a significant role in promoting this belief in northern China. One of its leaders, Han Shantong, declared himself to be the King of Light in the early 1350s. Han Shantong came from a family of hereditary sect leaders in Luancheng, a region in northeastern Hubei. His grandfather had been exiled to Yongnian in the southern part of the province. The Han clan also used a popular legend to their advantage, claiming to be descendants of the Song dynasty. Han Shantong asserted that he was a seventh-generation descendant of Emperor Huizong (r. 1100–1126).

The source of soldiers for the planned uprising were peasants who had been recruited by the Yuan government in 1351 to repair the Yellow River embankments and canals. The White Lotus agitated among them, but few workers joined the rebels before the work was completed in the summer of 1351. Alarmed by this, local authorities arrested Han Shantong, which sparked a rebellion by his supporters in Yingzhou, Anhui Province, on 28 May 1351. In early autumn of the same year, rebel groups occupied a number of cities on the upper reaches of the Huai River (in southern Henan) and defeated local government forces several times. The rebels were now led by White Lotus activist Liu Futong. The rebel army declared itself the "Red Turban Army" (hongjin jun), abbreviated as the "Red Army" (hongjun). Its fighters wore red scarves or turbans around their heads as a distinctive sign. The rebels declared their goal to restore the Song dynasty, but in practice, they mainly recited sutras to the people and engaged in local fighting, which exhausted them.

In August 1351, a rebellion erupted in Xuzhou, located in northern Jiangsu Province. The rebellion was led by Li Er, also known as "Sesame Seed Li". Li's army quickly joined forces with Liu's army, and Li himself pledged allegiance to Liu. The news of the successful rebellion of the northern Red Turbans also inspired rebels in Hubei and Jiangxi to rise up. The rebels in Hubei, known as the southern Red Turbans, established the Tianwan state under Xu Shouhui before the end of 1351. Another rebel, Guo Zixing, took Haozhou in February of the following year.

The Yuan government, under the leadership of the minister Toqto'a, prioritized securing the Grand Canal despite initial confusion and hesitation. In October 1352, forces of Toqto'a successfully recaptured Xuzhou and continued their advance southward. Chaghan Temur, representing the local nobility, organized his own army which drove the Red Army out of southern Henan. The Red Army then retreated east to the regions of Anfeng, Bozhou, and Yingzhou in northern Anhui. From 1353 to 1354, the northern Red Turbans did not make any significant appearances, allowing the Yuan forces to focus on successful campaigns elsewhere.

== Early reign ==
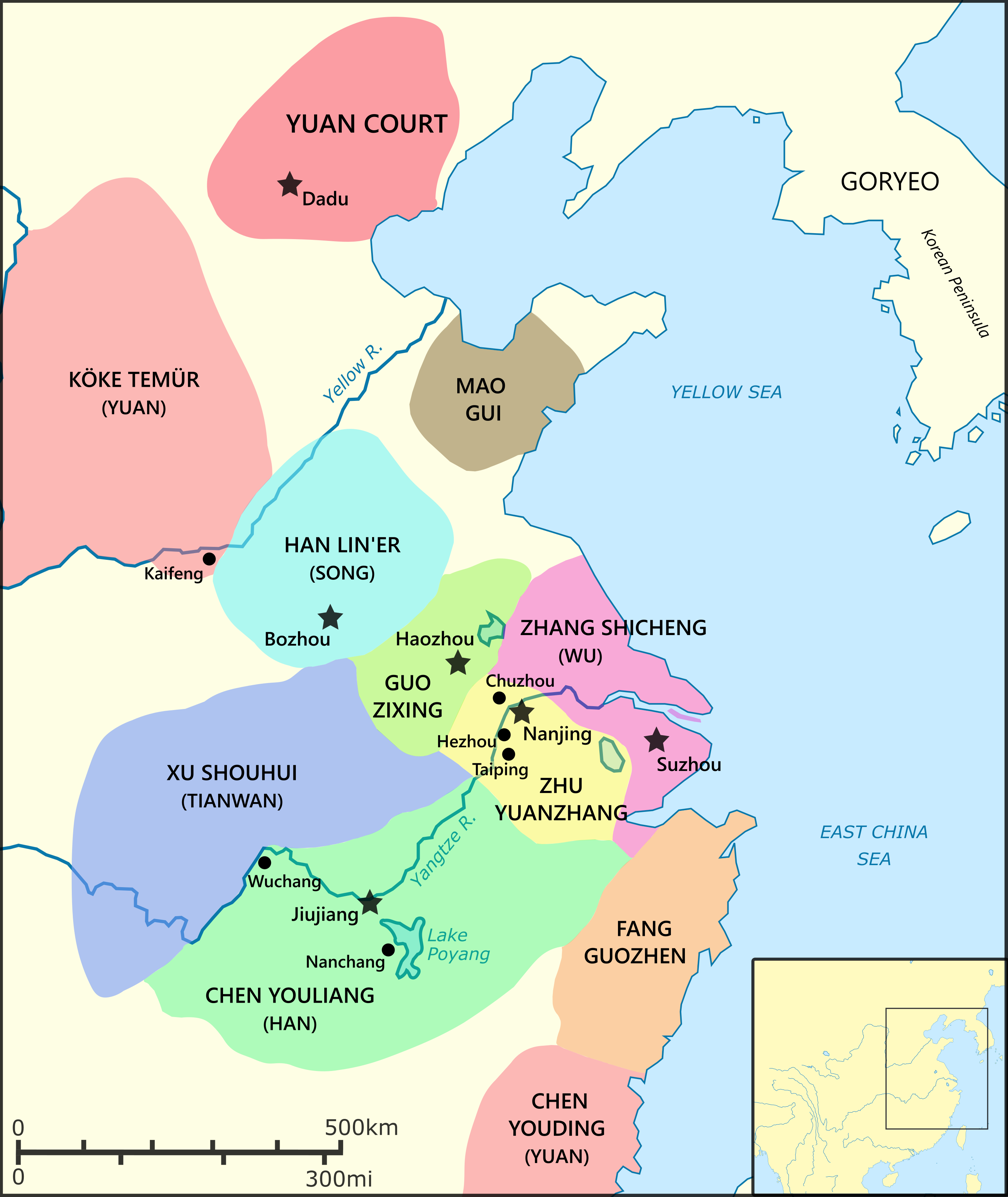
Major powers in China during the late Yuan dynasty, c. 1350–1360, with the territory controlled by Han Lin'er being marked in cyan

In January 1355, the Yuan government dismissed Toqto'a and finally executed Han Shantong. In March that year, Han's son, Han Lin'er, having been in hiding since his father was arrested, arrived in Bozhou. With the support of Liu Futong, Han Lin'er was crowned as the emperor of the Great Song (Da Song) and adopted the era name Longfeng (Dragon and Phoenix). His religious title was "Lesser King of Light" (Xiaoming wang). Du Zundao, a former Yuan official in the Ministry of War, was chosen as the prime minister and de facto ruler of the state, but in the same year, Liu assassinated Du and replaced him as prime minister.

In 1355, a group of rebels at Hezhou, who had split from Guo Zixing's original forces in Haozhou, made contact with Du and submitted to the Song state to protect themselves from attacks by other groups. Guo's son-in-law, Zhu Yuanzhang, was confirmed as the third in command. In the summer of 1355, they crossed the Yangtze River and the following year, under Zhu's leadership, they successfully captured Nanjing and expanded their influence further south. At the same time, Song commanders Li Wu and Cui De launched an attack on the eastern Wei River valley in Shaanxi from Xiangyang.

Compared to the early 1350s, the rebels were significantly better organized and had established regular military units. In 1356, Liu launched a series of extensive raids, resulting in Song troops reaching Shaanxi in the west, the Yuan summer capital of Shangdu in the north, and Pyongyang in the east in Korea. These actions were carried out by loosely affiliated rebel groups that acknowledged the authority of the Song regime. In the liberated territories, the Song government established a total of five provinces between 1356 and 1359. The most competent administrators were Mao Gui, who established a functional administration in Shandong, and Zhu Yuanzhang, who led Jiangnan Province (located south of the Yangtze River) from 1356. The central administration under Liu was large but inefficient. Additionally, Liu was unable to consolidate the rebel forces, causing them to scatter in various directions.

In 1357, Mao's army was unable to hold out in his home province of Liaodong and crossed over to Shandong, where he successfully occupied territory up to the Grand Canal. Mao's achievements caught the attention of Tian Feng, the Yuan commander of western Shandong, who defected to the Song side. At the same time, Liu took control of the southern Taihang Mountains and the nearby Wei River valley. In addition, a rebel group known as the Green Turbans (Note: The Green Turbans were led by Li Xixi, Bai Buxin, and Dadao Ao.) launched attacks on western Shaanxi from Sichuan.

The years 1357–1358 marked the peak of the Song power. In June 1358, Liu successfully captured Kaifeng, the former capital of the Song dynasty, which held great symbolic and practical significance. He then dispatched subordinate commanders to launch attacks in Anhui, Shandong, and the most successful of them, Mao Gui, led an assault on the Yuan capital of Dadu (present-day Beijing). Another significant offensive took place in the Fen River valley in Shanxi. (Note: The army was led by Guan Duo, Pan Cheng, and Sha Liu Er.)

Mao was eventually forced to retreat back to Shandong. In Shanxi, the local Song army split into three groups and moved north along the Fen River valley but were unable to establish a strong presence. The main force, led by Guan Duo, headed for Shangdu while the remaining troops were scattered. The remnants of the Green Turbans were driven to the northeast and Sichuan, where they surrendered to Ming Yuzhen, who was under the rule of the Tianwan state. Li Wu and Cui De were also driven into the mountains and eventually surrendered to the local Mongol commander, Li Siqi, in 1361.

== Late reign at Anfeng ==
Despite Han being formally recognized as the supreme leader, the local northern Red Turban commanders acted independently and engaged in conflicts with each other. In 1359, Zhao Junyong broke out of Huai'an and headed north to Shandong, where he assassinated Mao. In retaliation, Mao's successor was also killed. These disputes over succession paralyzed the Song province of Shandong, effectively preventing any further offensive against Dadu.

In the winter of 1359, Guan Duo burned Shangdu and then proceeded eastward without following Song rule. He joined forces with another rebel, Mao Jujing, in Liaoyang. The two rebels then attempted to attack Korea, with Mao doing so in 1360 and Guan in 1361. However, these attacks were unsuccessful and the remaining Song army was forced to return to China in 1363. They were ultimately forced to surrender to the Mongol warlord Naghachu in Liaodong.

In September 1359, the Yuan general Chaghan Temur drove Han from Kaifeng, taking advantage of the dispersion of Song forces throughout northern China and the resulting relative weakness in the center. Han and Liu were left with only a few hundred soldiers, and they and their entire court survived in the strategically insignificant Bozhou and later in Anfeng, in northwestern Anhui. Chaghan Temur postponed another attack on the Song until 1361, when he began his conquest of Shandong. This was due to a war with another Yuan general, Bolad Temür. Chaghan Temur then trapped the rebels in Yidu, which fell after a year-long siege. The Song government was only able to send token aid to the besieged.

After Han's retreat from Kaifeng, the power of the Song government rapidly declined, and its provinces were left to fend for themselves. Despite this, the Song forces managed to hold out in various areas in the Huai River basin until the late 1350s. They also remained active in northwestern Henan and Shaanxi from 1356 to 1359, until Chaghan Temur forced them to retreat to Sichuan. The Song forces were able to hold onto Yidu in Shandong for five years until 1362, and also engaged in battles in Chahar and Manchuria from 1358 to 1362 (due to Mao's attempt to attack Dadu). After the early 1360s, the northern Red Turbans only maintained their significance through the nominal loyalty of Zhu Yuanzhang, whose Jiangnan was the only Song province to survive in 1362. While the Song state still held control over the North China Plain from 1355 to 1359 and caught the attention of Mongol rule, other rebel states in the south grew stronger and consolidated their power, including Zhang Shicheng's Zhou (later Wu) state and Chen Youliang's Han state.

== Final years ==
=== Loss of Anfeng ===
In Anfeng, the Song regime managed to survive until late February 1363, when it was attacked by Zhang Shicheng's troops in conjunction with Mongol forces. During this attack, Liu was captured and killed, (Note: According to some accounts, Liu Futong survived the fall of Anfeng but drowned along with Han Lin'er in 1367.) while Han was saved by the arrival of Zhu Yuanzhang's army. Despite being embroiled in a war with Chen Youliang, Zhu took a risky decision to send his main forces north to Anfeng. This decision was met with opposition from Confucian scholar and leading government official Liu Ji, who warned that joining forces with the White Lotus sect would jeopardize Zhu's support among the gentry. However, Zhu's generals and soldiers were still influenced by White Lotus propaganda and their devotion to the Song cause, which Zhu could not afford to ignore.

=== Death and aftermath ===
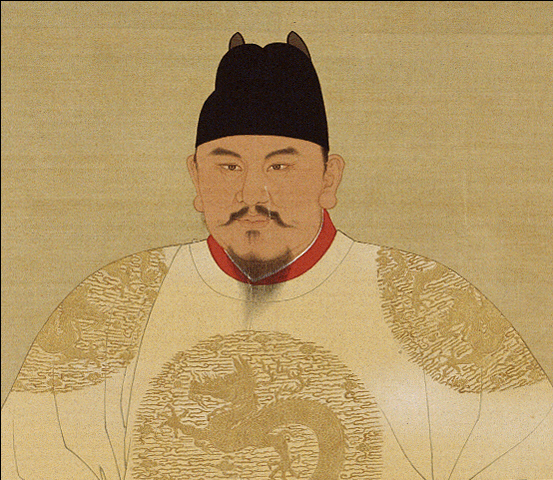
Zhu Yuanzhang, who nominally submitted to Han Lin'er, was suspected of being responsible for his death.

In June 1363, Chen attacked Zhu, causing the plan to formally enthrone Han to be abandoned. Han and his court were then relocated to Chuzhou, located west of Nanjing on the opposite bank of the Yangtze River. Han resided there until January 1367, when he drowned in the Yangtze River while on a journey to Nanjing.

The northern regions of China, which were previously under the control of the Song regime, were conquered by pro-Yuan warlords, led by Köke Temür. The only remaining territory that remained loyal to the Song emperor was the Song province of Jiangnan, which was led by Zhu Yuanzhang. He held the title of Duke of Wu from 1361 and became King of Wu in February 1364. From 1363 to 1367, Zhu successfully conquered vast territories in the middle and lower regions of the Yangtze River, including Chen's Han state and Zhang's Wu state. This gave him a significant advantage over his rivals in the struggle for control of China. After gaining complete independence, Zhu's rule was unchallenged and the Song court had no real power. Zhu's control was so complete that even the Song court was under his control after 1363. Following Han Lin'er's death, Zhu attempted to distance himself from the Song regime and the Red Turbans by removing any mention of them from official documents. He also suppressed the White Lotus faith and replaced it with Neo-Confucianism as the state ideology.

In early 1368, Zhu changed the name of his state from Wu to Ming and declared himself emperor. By 1371, he had successfully unified most of China under his rule. However, his attempt to conquer Mongolia was thwarted by the defeat of the Ming army in 1372.

== Notes ==
Han Lin'er House of Han Died: 1367
Regnal titles
New title State founded	Emperor of the Song; 1355–1367	State ended
