= Song Shen =

Ming dynasty official (1342–1382)

Song Shen (宋慎) (1342–1382, born in Pujiang, Zhejiang), the eldest grandson of Song Lian, was a Chinese official of the Ming dynasty. Song Shen was originally an usher of the Palace Ceremonial Office (殿庭儀禮司) (later the Court of State Ceremonial (鴻臚寺)), and together with his grandfather Song Lian and uncle Song Yu, he served as an official in the imperial palace. In the 13th year of Hongwu, Song Shen was involved in the Hu Weiyong case and was executed, and his family was demoted to Maozhou (present-day Maoxian, Sichuan).
