= Chaghan Temur =

Yuan dynasty Mongolian officer and military leader

Chaghan Temur (Chinese: 察罕帖木兒; Mongolian: ᠴᠠᠭᠠᠨ ᠲᠡᠮᠦᠷ), Sinicized name Li Chahan (李察罕), courtesy name Tingrui (廷瑞), posthumous name Prince Zhongxiang of Yingchuan (潁川忠襄王), was an ethnic Naiman military general of China's Mongol-led Yuan dynasty.

== Life ==
Chaghan Temur's family originated from Beshbaliq, in present-day Jimsar County, Xinjiang. His great-grandfather migrated to China proper following the Mongols' invasion. When he was young, Chaghan Temur passed the imperial examination and obtained the degree of Juren.

In the year of 1351, there was an outburst of bandit raids in Chaghan Temur's hometown. Counties nearby were attacked and sacked. Out of self defense, Chaghan Temur organized local militia in Shenqiu to fight off the bandits. The news of a Juren improving public security was heard in the court. In 1352, Chaghan Temur became the darughachi of Running Fu. He was able to gather as many as 10,000 people under his command at the time.

In 1355, he marched northward. After a series of successful battles, he managed to pacify the chaos of Hebei. The imperial court rewarded him with a civil position. In 1356, he was appointed the Bingbu Shangshu (Minister of war).

The rest of his life was spent on battlefield. The Yuan dynasty was in turbulence. Han Chinese farmers were oppressed under Yuan rule. Rebel leaders such as Han Shantong and Liu Futong caused the dynasty to strive for survival. Chaghan Temur managed to defeat Liu's force in Henan and consequently rescued Khanbaliq from the starvation resulted by the disruption of transportation of essential food supplies from South to North. Eventually Chaghan Temur was assassinated by Wang Shichen, a surrendered leader of farmer riots, in the year of 1362.

Posthumously, he was granted the title "Prince of Yingchuan" (潁川王) and a posthumous name "Zhongxiang" (忠襄), according to Confucian traditions.

His nephew and step-son Köke Temür was also a general who fought for the failing Yuan dynasty.

== Children ==
1. Temur's nephew and adopted son. After his death, he was appointed Grand Marshal, Minister of the Secretariat, Director of the Privy Council, and Grand Doctor of Silver and Green Honor, inheriting his army. On November 4, 1362 (November 20, 1362), Kuyuk Timur led his army to capture Yidu, killing Tian Feng and Wang Shicheng, avenging Chagan Timur. On August 2, 1368 (September 14, 1368), the Ming army conquered Dadu, ending Yuan rule over China. The Yuan retreated to their homeland in the Mongolian steppes and continued their struggle against the Ming, known in history as the Northern Yuan. Kuyuk Timur became a pillar of the Northern Yuan court, engaging in a long-term confrontation with the emerging Ming dynasty in the northern frontier. During Zhu Yuanzhang's Northern Expedition, he traveled to Henan to command the campaign and offered sacrifices at Chagan Timur's tomb in an attempt to persuade Wang Baobao to surrender, but to no avail.
2. Wang Baobao's sister, also known as Princess Wang (Zhu Chong), married the Prince of Qin, Zhu Chong, in 1371 and was forced to be buried alive with him in 1395. Wang Baobao's biological father, Saiyin Chidahu, had two other sons and one daughter: Tuyin Temur, Nailu, and Guanyinnu. Whether she was a Guanyin slave or Chagan Temur's daughter is unknown. However, if Chagan Temur and Wang Baobao never responded to Zhu Yuanzhang's letters, it would be reasonable to choose a female relative from a more peripheral branch for the marriage.
