= Han Shantong =

Red Turban rebellion leader (1318–1355)

Han Shantong (Chinese: 韓山童; pinyin: Hán Shāntóng; died 1351), born in Luancheng, Hebei, was one of the early leaders of the Red Turban Rebellions. He claimed to be the descendant of Emperor Huizong of Song (1082–1135), the penultimate emperor of the Northern Song dynasty, and rebelled against the Mongol-led Yuan dynasty.

== Background of the rise to popularity ==
The Yellow River flood of 1344 caused heavy casualties, displacement, hunger, epidemics, and the crisis in Dadu, the Yuan capital. The popular discontent with the ruling Yuan dynasty was triggered by the major construction project of the Yellow River rerouting 1351.

== Rebellion leader's career ==
During the works, he claimed to have found a stone image with only one eye and a prophecy about the revolt inscribed on its back (Caomuzi). This was probably the reflection of some popular beliefs already widespread in Henan of the time. Han proclaimed the rebirth of Maitreya Buddha and the near coming of the "King of Light" (天下大亂，彌勒下生，明王出世). Apparently, he used the title for himself (although there is no such historical record, after his death his son became known under the title "King of Light the Young", which provides the indirect evidence.)

Han Shantong found a staunch supporter in Liu Futong. After the plot was discovered, Han was executed.

== The son and legacy ==
Han's son, Han Lin'er became the symbol of the following rebellion, of which Liu Futong became the leading general. Zhu Yuanzhang, the future founder of the Ming dynasty, was Han Lin'er's subordinate as late as 1363. Though Han and Liu's military power declined after 1359, Lin'er was probably seen as a legitimate future emperor. However, in 1366 or 1367, he accidentally drowned in a pond, not having achieved the rulership. There is suspicion that the drowning was staged by Zhu Yuanzhang's agents; by this time Zhu Yuanzhang was already approaching the victory in his struggle for the Mandate of Heaven (The story was reminiscent of Xiang Yu and the puppet Emperor Yi of Chu).

Historical sources on the power transition predating foundation of the Ming dynasty were destroyed or heavily censored in order to hide the base origin of the founding emperor and his relation to the rebels. For this reason information on Han Shantong and other rebel leaders is very scarce.

The single extant historical reference to Han Shantong's grandfather being a member of a "White Lotus gathering" developed into a stereotype that his teaching belonged to some clandestine tradition of long standing. This view is refuted by Ter Haar's research

== See also ==
- Xu Shouhui
- Chen Youliang

== Sources ==
- Barend J. ter Haar, The White Lotus Teachings in Chinese Religious History
