= Liu Bowen =

Chinese philosopher and politician (1311–1375)

Liu Ji
- 劉基
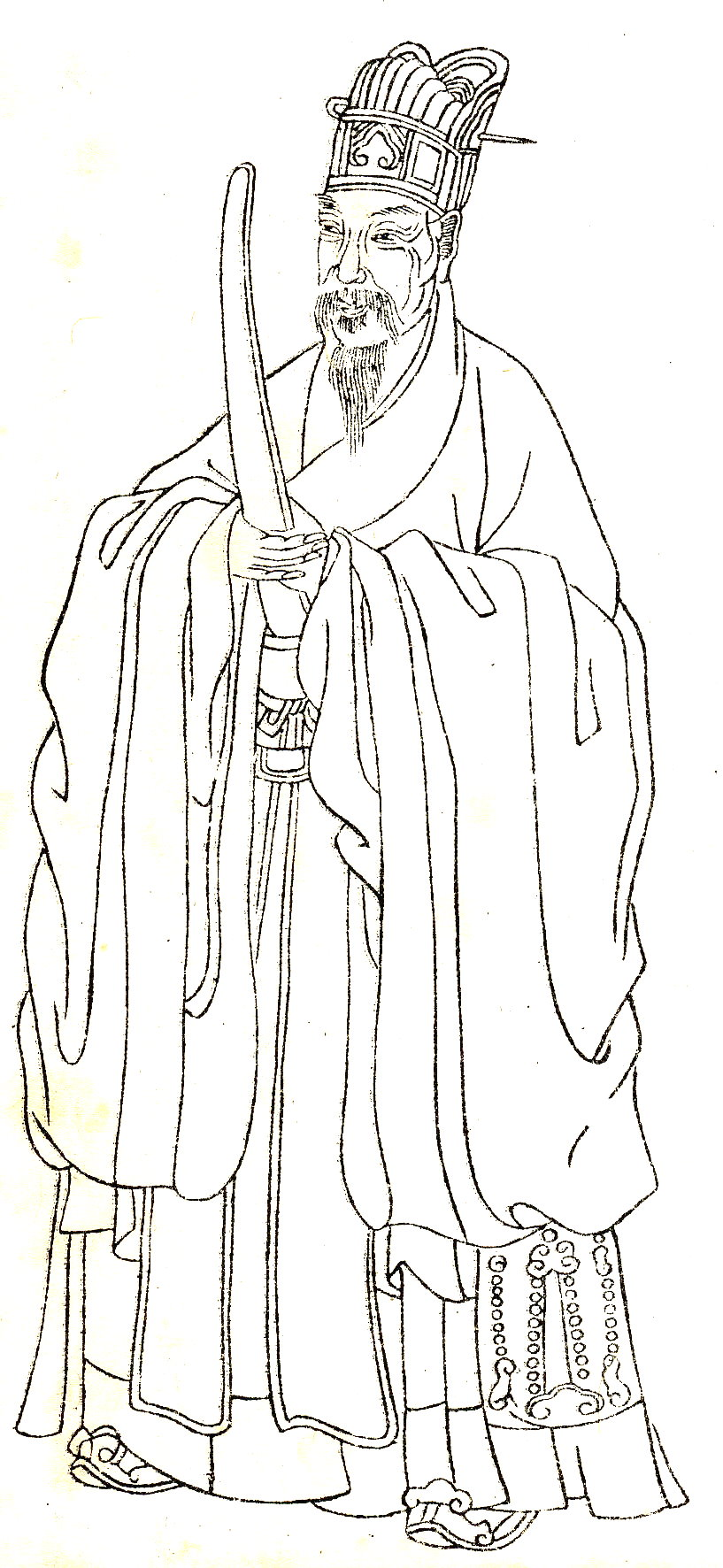
- A Qing dynasty illustration of Liu Ji in the Wanxiaotang Huanchuan, by Shangguan Zhou
- Born: 1 July 1311; Zhida 4, 15th day of the 6th month (至大四年六月十五日); Nan'tian Township, Qingtian County, Chuzhou Lu, Jiangzhe Province (present-day Wencheng County, Zhejiang)
- Died: 16 May 1375 (aged 63); Hongwu 8, 16th day of the 4th month (洪武八年四月十六日); Nan'tian Township, Qingtian County, Chuzhou Prefecture, Zhejiang Province (present-day Wencheng County, Zhejiang)
- Other names: Liu Bowen (劉伯溫); Wencheng (文成)
- Occupations: Politician, military strategist, philosopher
- Title: Count of Chengyi (诚意伯)
- Children: Liu Lian; Liu Jing

Liu Ji (1 July 1311 – 16 May 1375), courtesy name Bowen, better known as Liu Bowen, was a Chinese military strategist, philosopher, and politician who lived in the late Yuan and early Ming dynasties. He was born in Qingtian County (present-day Wencheng County, Lishui, Zhejiang). He served as a key advisor to Zhu Yuanzhang, the Hongwu Emperor, the founder of the Ming dynasty, in the latter's struggle to overthrow the Yuan dynasty and unify China proper under his rule. Liu is also known for his prophecies and has been described as the "Divine Chinese Nostradamus". He and Jiao Yu co-edited the military treatise known as the Huolongjing (Fire Dragon Manual).

Liu Bowen initially aided Zhu Yuanzhang in his ascent to power, but later Li Shanchang and Hu Weiyong quarrelled with Liu, forcing Liu to resign. Liu Bowen warned the Hongwu Emperor that Hu was not suitable for the position of prime minister. Liu died soon after, possibly having been poisoned by the emperor and Hu Weiyong, in a political affair that became the first of the Four Major Cases of the early Ming dynasty.

== Career ==
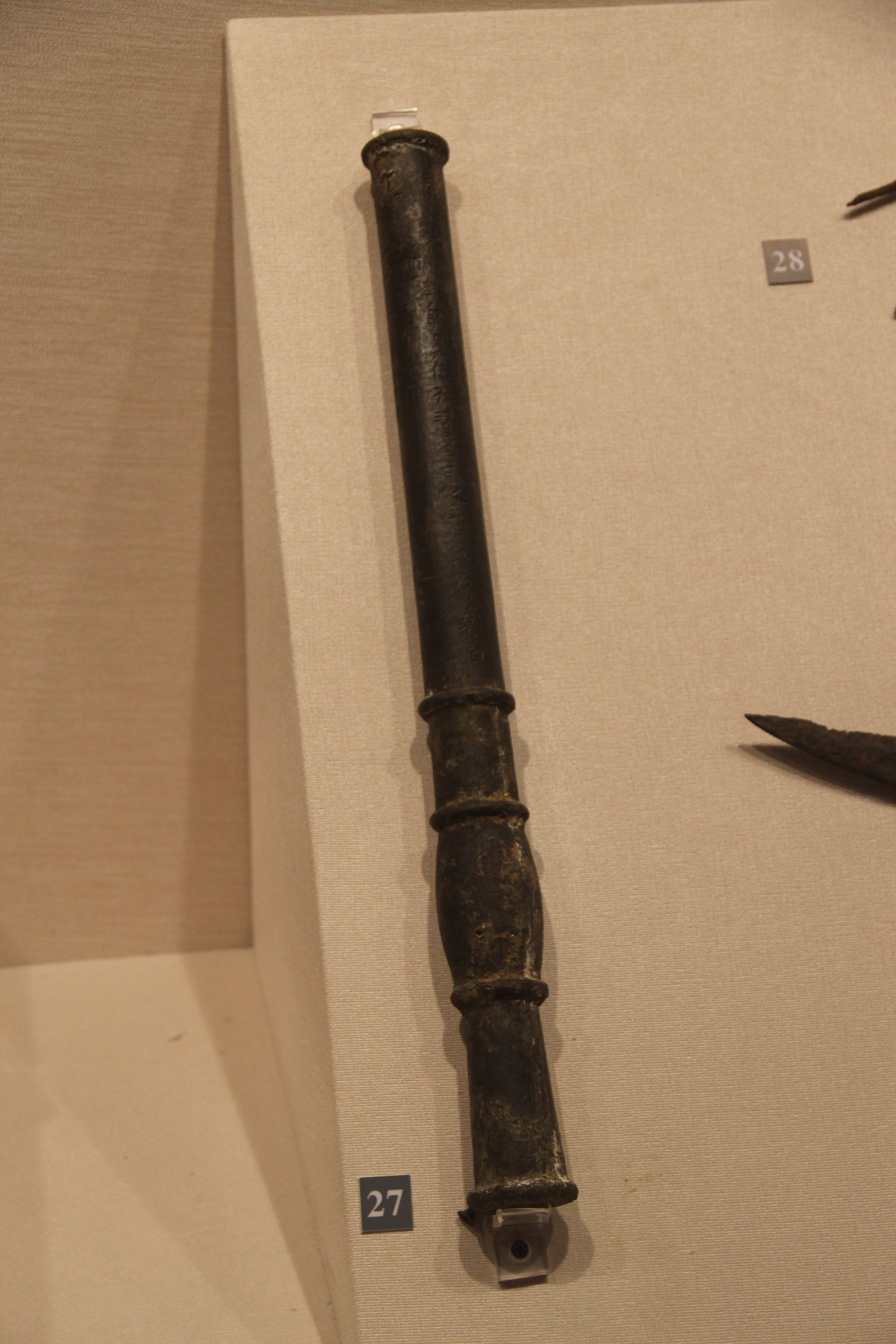
Hand cannon, Ming dynasty, 1377

Liu served under Zhu Yuanzhang's rebellion against the Mongol-led Yuan dynasty, which had ruled all of China proper since the conquest of the Southern Song in 1279. He dabbled in many fields of statecraft, philosophy, scholarly works, and technology. His philosophical outlook was that of a skeptical naturalist, and he became interested in astronomy, calendrical science, magnetism, and fengshui. He was known to be a friendly associate of the mathematician and alchemist Zhao Yuqin, and collaborated with the contemporary general and scholar Jiao Yu to edit and compile the military-technology treatise of the Huolongjing, which outlined the use of various gunpowder weapons. He was very interested in the latter, and once said that "thunder is like fire shot from a cannon".

=== Early service under the Yuan dynasty ===
Liu sat for the imperial examination and obtained the position of a jinshi ("presented scholar", the highest grade of successful candidate) in the final years of the Yuan dynasty. He spent much of his early career attempting to save the Yuan dynasty from collapse. He served the Yuan dynasty as an official for 25 years, gaining a reputation for integrity and honesty, and became known as a distinguished scholar and strategist. In 1348, he was appointed to a military position and assigned to put down a southern rebellion against the dynasty. The leader of the rebellion attempted to save himself by offering Liu a bribe. When Liu refused, the rebel went to Beijing and succeeded in bribing his way into favour there.

Once the secessionist had bribed his way into the regime's favour, he was given a public office and a salary. Liu's relationship with the Yuan government deteriorated after this event. He attempted to resign twice, in 1349 and 1352. He was demoted in 1358, and finally left service to retire in his ancestral homeland. In 1360, Liu was introduced to Zhu Yuanzhang, a former leader of a radical White Lotus rebellion who was then the leader of a broad anti-Yuan rebellion.

=== Service to Zhu Yuanzhang ===
Liu served not only in the administration of Zhu Yuanzhang, but also in many battles as a commanding officer on land and water, leading the early Ming naval forces. Zhu Yuanzhang placed Liu in charge of the campaign to conquer all of Zhejiang from Yuan forces. Liu was also responsible for military ventures against opposing Chinese rebel groups, as well as the wokou. His forces owed much of their success to the use of the medieval Chinese firearm known as the fire lance. It was during this period that he wrote the books Extraordinary Strategies of a Hundred Battles (百戰奇略) and Eighteen Strategies and Affairs (時務十八策). Later in the rebellion, Zhu Yuanzhang only rarely relied on Liu to personally command his armies in the field, as he acquired other capable generals, including Xu Da, Deng Yu and Chang Yuchun. Liu was most often consulted for his strategic advice during this period.

In 1368, after eight years of Liu's service, Zhu Yuanzhang unified China proper. When Zhu founded the Ming dynasty and became historically known as the Hongwu Emperor, Liu was one of his most trusted advisors, but the relationship between Liu and the emperor eventually deteriorated in a manner similar to the way that Liu had become estranged from the Yuan government. In 1375, Liu rejected Hu Weiyong for appointment to high office. Hu Weiyong later obtained an audience with the Hongwu Emperor and slandered Liu by telling the emperor that Liu was plotting to establish his own power. After convincing the emperor of Liu's treachery, Liu was ejected from office, and Hu Weiyong was promoted.

=== Death ===
The shock and shame of being groundlessly dismissed from office had destroyed Liu's health, and he died soon after. The precise cause of Liu's death is considered uncertain by modern scholars. In late January of Hongwu's eighth year (1375), Liu caught a cold. After Zhu Yuanzhang found out, he sent Hu Weiyong to find an imperial doctor for Liu. However, after Liu had taken the doctor's medicines, he felt as if some uneven stones were being squeezed together in his stomach, which gave him even more pain. Liu gently told Zhu Yuanzhang that he felt more pain after taking Hu Weiyong's doctor's medicines. After Zhu Yuanzhang listened to this, he only gave some comforting words to Liu, which made Liu feel upset. In late March, Liu had already been unable to move freely. Therefore, he decided to return home. Once he got home, he refused all the medicines and just tried to maintain a normal diet as much as possible. Eventually, in April, Liu died. Some scholars believe that Liu was poisoned by the Hongwu Emperor himself, not because Liu had failed his duty, but because the emperor was envious and even fearful of his knowledge and influence. Other sources have pointed out that the Hongwu Emperor did kill many people shortly after Liu lost his official position, but they are uncertain about whether Liu was part of this group.

Within five years of Liu's death, the man who had slandered Liu in order to hold office, Hu Weiyong, was himself suspected of plotting against the Hongwu Emperor. In the subsequent orgy of the emperor's paranoid efforts to root out conspiracy, 30,000–40,000 people were executed.

== Prophecy ==
Liu's most famous prophecy to Zhu Yuanzhang, written down in a lyrical style, is called the Shaobing Song (燒餅歌). The poem is written in cryptic verse and is difficult to understand. Some people believe that the Shaobing Song predicted future events in China, including the Tumu Crisis of 1449, and the Xinhai Revolution of 1911 that led to the Republic of China.

== Biographical works ==
Liu's official biography is found in the 128th volume of the History of Ming, which was written by Zhang Tingyu and others in the Qing dynasty. The author Chong Tai also wrote a biography on him.

== In popular culture ==
Shenji Miaosuan Liu Bowen (simplified Chinese: 神机妙算刘伯温; traditional Chinese: 神機妙算劉伯溫; pinyin: Shénjī Miàosuàn Líu Bówēn; lit. 'The Divine Witted and Marvelous Predictor Liu Bowen'), a 404 episodes long television drama about Liu, was aired in Taiwan on TTV from August 23, 2006 to March 12, 2008, starring Taiwanese actor Huang Shaoqi (黃少祺) as Liu.

== See also ==
- Huolongjing
- Shaobing Song
- History of firearms
- Four Major Cases of the early Ming dynasty
- Chancellor of China
