= Li Shanchang =

Ming dynasty official (1314–1390)

- 李善長
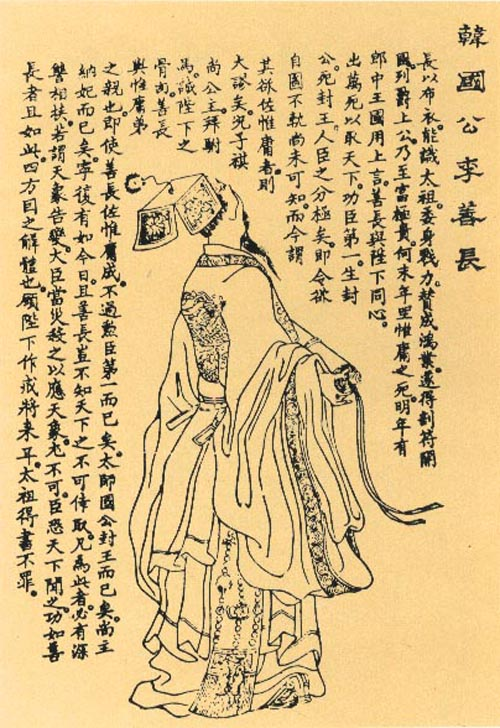
- A Qing dynasty illustration of Li Shanchang in the Wanxiaotang Huanchuan, by Shangguan Zhou

Left Grand Councilor
- In office 1368–1371
- Preceded by: Office established
- Succeeded by: Xu Da

Personal details
- Born: 1314; Yuan Yanyou 1 (元延祐元年) Dingyuan County, Hao Prefecture, Anfeng Lu, Henan Jiangbei Province
- Died: 1390 (aged 75–76); Ming Hongwu 23 (明洪武二十三年) Yingtian Prefecture
- Children: Li Qi (son); Li Fang (grandson); Li Mao (grandson)
- Occupation: Politician

Li Shanchang (Chinese: 李善長; pinyin: Lǐ Shàncháng; Wade–Giles: Li Shan-ch'ang; 1314–1390) was a Chinese official of the Ming dynasty. A Duke of Han of the West Huai (Huaixi) faction, he was one of six founding dukes of the Ming dynasty in 1370. Li Shanchang was one of Emperor Hongwu's associates during the war against the Yuan dynasty to establish the Ming dynasty. Deeply trusted by the Emperor, Hongwu consulted Li on institutional matters, but grew "bored with Li's arrogance" in old age. Ultimately, the emperor purged and executed Li along with his extended family and thirty thousand others, accusing him of supporting treason.

Li planned the organization of the six ministries, helped draft a new law code, and supervised the compiling of the History of Yuan, being the Ancestral Instructions and the Ritual Compendium of the Ming Dynasty. He established salt and tea monopolies based on Yuan institutions, launched an anti-corruption campaign, restored minted currency, opened iron foundries, and instituted fish taxes. It is said that revenues were sufficient, yet the people were not oppressed.

A doubtful classicist, he was charged with drafting legal documents, mandates, and military communications. The History of Ming biography states that his studies included Chinese Legalist writings, including a reward and punishment system was influenced by Han Feizi. Most of his activities seem to have supported Hongwu Emperor's firm control of his regime, and had a kind of secret police in his service. He was tasked with purging political opponents, anti-corruption, and rooting out disloyal military officers. At times, he had charge of all civil and military officials in Nanjing.

== Biography ==
Li was a marginal figure in Dingyuan County until his recruitment by the Emperor Hongwu, who was passing through the area with his army. Li discussed history with him, namely, the qualities of the founding Han Emperor Gaozu of Han, and the emperor invited Li to take over the secretarial and managerial duties of his field command. He proved able and energetic, often staying behind to transfer army provisions. He was given first rank among officers with the titles of Left Grand Councilor and "Duke of Han". Comparisons between the Emperor Hongwu and Gaozu became a theme of the Ming Court and its historians.

One history holds that, after the navy in Chaohu surrendered to the emperor, Li urged ferrying the soldiers to capture the southern area of the Yangtze River. Then Li gave an advance notice to prevent the army from violating the military discipline. The duplicates of his notice were plastered everywhere in the occupied city, Taiping. Consequently, the troops garrisoned there in an orderly fashion.

The emperor asked Li to assume responsibility for administrative affairs in 1353, granting him overall institutional authority long before legal codification work started. Li's petitioning Emperor Hongwu to eliminate collective prosecution reportedly initiated the drafting. Hongwu ordered Li and others to create the basic law code in 1367, appointing him Left Councilor and chief legislator in a commission of 30 ministers.

Hongwu noted that the Tang dynasty and Song dynasty had fully developed criminal statutes, ignored by the Yuan dynasty. Li memorialized that all previous codes were based on the Han code, synthesized under the Tang, and based their institutions on the Tang Code. Emphasizing the importance of simplicity and clarity, he mandated that it be concise and intelligible.

Following the drafting of the code, Li personally oversaw any new stipulations, including a system of fixed statutes made to combat corruption. He joined with Hu Weiyong against Yang Xian, another chancellor. Their efforts contributed to Yang's death, making Li the most powerful figure in the court next to the emperor in 1370. He quarreled with the great classical scholar Liu Bowen, causing Liu to resign from public office.

=== Execution of Li and his family ===
In old age, Li retired as the emperor's distaste grew for his arrogance, but was still recalled to deliberate military and dynastic affairs. Another councilor, Guangyang, remembered his carefulness, generosity, honesty, uprightness and seriousness, was demoted several times. A lack of division of powers between the Emperor and his councilors resulted in conflicts, and the four grand councilors gave up on state affairs, following prevailing affairs or doing nothing. Appointed to right councilor, Li gave himself over to drinking. He was ultimately implicated in 1390 in a decade-long conspiracy and purged along with his extended family and thirty thousand others. He was executed largely on the basis of his awareness and non-reporting of treason. The post of councilor (or prime minister) was abolished following his execution. The accusations against him would be memorialized as absurd fabrications, and accepted by the still reigning Emperor Hongwu.

== See also ==
- Lan Yu
- Liu Bowen
- Yang Xian
- Hu Weiyong
- Four Major Cases of the early Ming dynasty

Political offices
Ming dynasty established	Left Grand Councilor; 1368–1371	Succeeded by Xu Da
