= Song Lian =

Chinese historian (1310–1381)

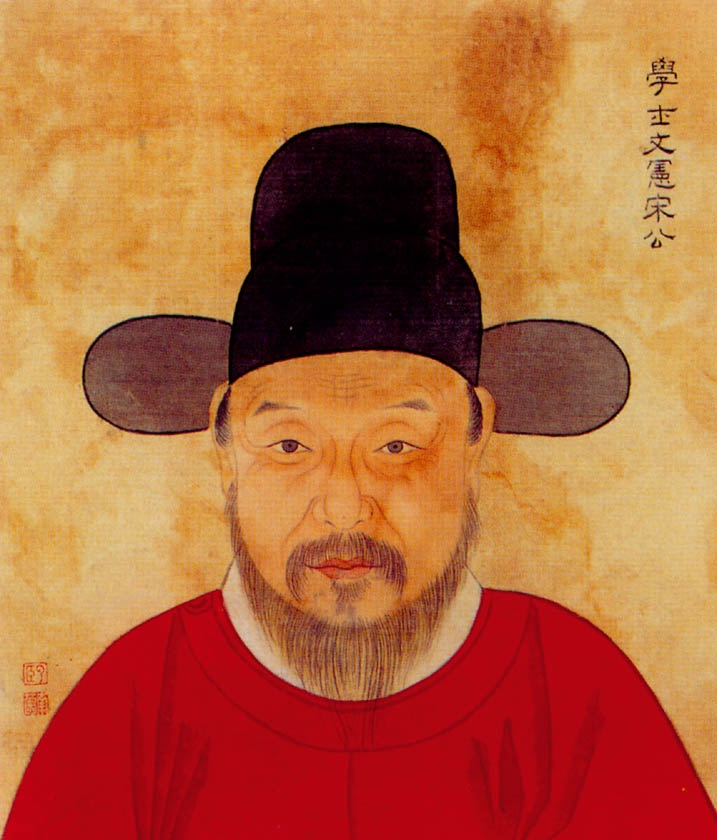
Portrait of Song Lian by Gu Jianlong

Song Lian (Chinese: 宋濂; 1310–1381), courtesy name Jinglian (景濂), was a Chinese historian and official of the Ming dynasty. He was a literary and political advisor to the Hongwu Emperor. Before that, he was one of the principal figures in the Yuan dynasty's Jinhua school of Neo-Confucianism. As a head of the official Bureau of History of the Ming dynasty, Song Lian directed the compilation of the official dynastic history of the preceding Yuan dynasty.

The compilation of the History of Yuan, commissioned by the court of the Ming dynasty, was completed in 1370. Under the guidance of Song Lian, the official dynastic history broke with the old Confucian historiographical tradition, and established a new historical paradigm professing that the influence of history was equal in influence to the great Confucian classics in directing the human affairs.

In Asian historiography, the History of Yuan is a major source for the study of the histories of the Han, Tungusic, Mongol, and Turkic peoples.

== See also ==
- Twenty-Four Histories
