= Chang Yuchun =

Chinese general (1330–1369)

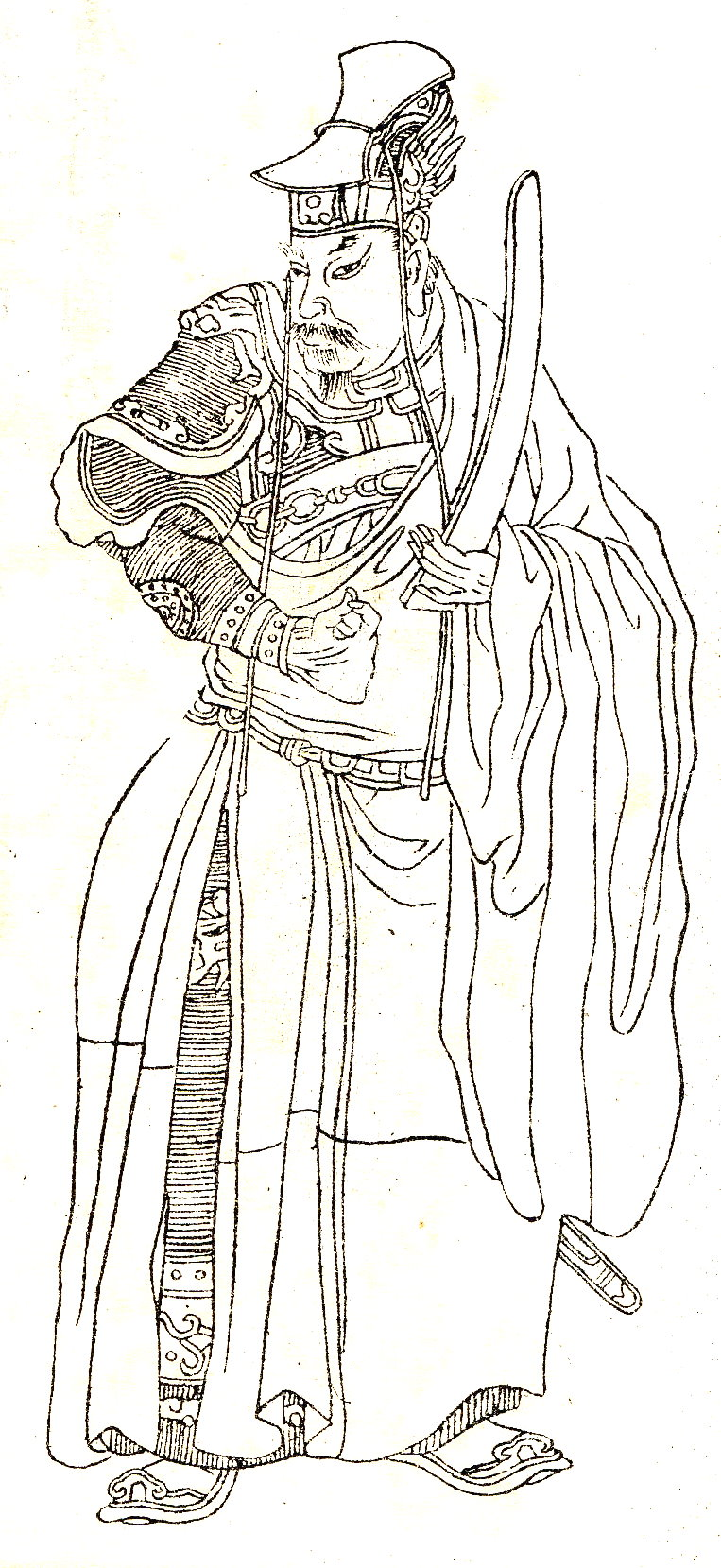
- A Qing dynasty illustration of Chang Yuchun in the Wanxiaotang Huachuan, by Shangguan Zhou
- Born: 1330; Huaiyuan County, Hao Prefecture, Anfeng Circuit, Henan Jiangbei Province, Yuan China
- Died: 9 August 1369 (aged 38–39); Liu'hechuan, Ming China
- Occupation: General
- Children: Chang Mao, first son; Chang Sheng, second son; Chang Sen, third son; Meirong (Empress Xiaokang), first daughter; Meiyu, second daughter; Meizhen, third daughter

Chang Yuchun
- Chinese: 常遇春
Transcriptions
Standard Mandarin
- Hanyu Pinyin: Cháng Yùchūn

Courtesy name
- Chinese: 伯仁
Transcriptions
Standard Mandarin
- Hanyu Pinyin: Bórén

Art name
- Chinese: 燕衡
Transcriptions
Standard Mandarin
- Hanyu Pinyin: Yànhéng

Chang Yuchun (1330 – 9 August 1369), courtesy name Boren (伯仁), art name Yanheng (燕衡), posthumous name Prince Zhongwu of Kaiping (开平忠武王), was a Chinese military general of the Ming dynasty. He was a follower of Zhu Yuanzhang (Hongwu Emperor), the founding emperor of the Ming dynasty, and contributed heavily to the establishment of the dynasty. He was famous for his bravery and formidable prowess in battle, which earned him the nickname of "Chang Hundred-Thousand" (常十万), because he alone was said to be as effective as a force of 100,000 troops.

== Biography ==
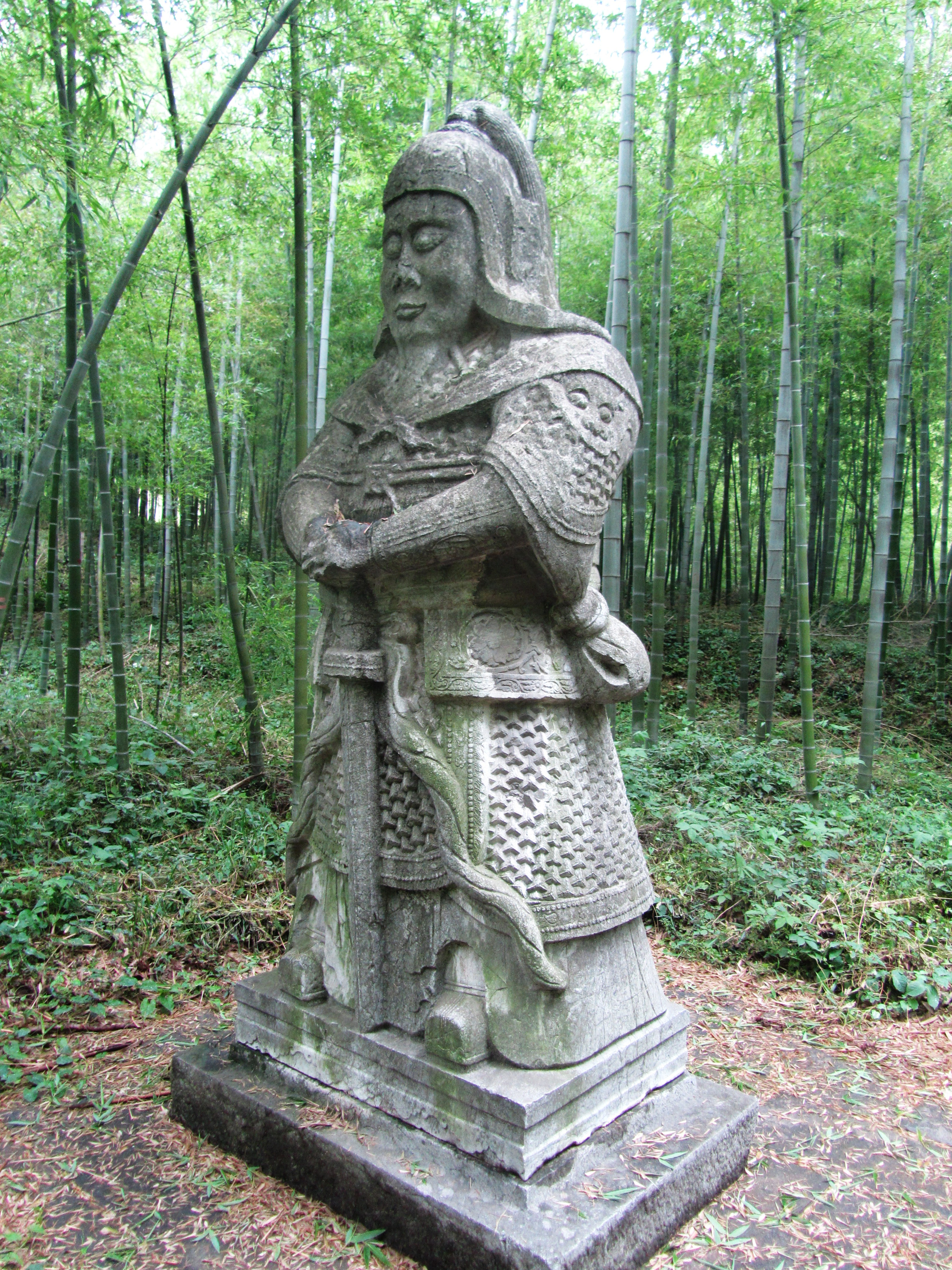
Tomb guardian at the tomb of Chang Yuchun

Chang was born in Huaiyuan County, Anhui, he was described as a stalwart man with imposing look and great strength. Chang joined the Red Turban Rebellion in 1355 to overthrow the Mongol-led Yuan dynasty. In the sixth month (Note: based on the lunisolar Chinese calendar) of that year, he followed Zhu Yuanzhang on a battle with the Yuan army that took place at Caishi (near present-day southern Ma'anshan, eastern bank of the Yangtze River). The rebel forces emerged victorious in that battle and Chang became famous. He was subsequently promoted to the rank of yuanshuai (equivalent of marshal).

Chang participated in major battles against Zhu Yuanzhang's rivals, Chen Youliang and Zhang Shicheng, helped Zhu eliminate them and laid the foundation for the Ming dynasty. He was granted the noble title "Duke of E" (鄂國公) by Zhu in 1366. In 1367, Chang followed Xu Da on a military campaign north and conquered the Yuan capital, Dadu (present-day Beijing), in the following year, thereby ending the Yuan dynasty.

In 1369, Chang died of illness on the return journey to Nanjing in the east of present-day Xuanhua County, Hebei. When Zhu Yuanzhang heard of Chang's death, he wrote a poem mourning Chang and posthumously granted Chang the noble title "Prince of Kaiping" (開平王) and the posthumous name "Zhongwu" (忠武), ranking second in the Imperial Ancestral Temples and Portrait Temples of Meritorious Officials. Chang Yuchun had three sons, Chang Mao (常茂), Chang Sheng (常升) and Chang Sen (常森).

== In fiction ==
Chang appears as a minor character in Louis Cha's wuxia novel The Heaven Sword and Dragon Saber. In the novel, he is a member of the Ming Cult, a rebel movement seeking to overthrow the Yuan dynasty. He is wounded in a fight with some Yuan soldiers but is saved by Zhang Sanfeng. He agrees to bring Zhang Wuji (the protagonist) with him to Butterfly Valley to seek treatment from the eccentric physician, Hu Qingniu. Several years later, Chang becomes Zhang Wuji's subordinate after Zhang becomes the cult's leader for his heroics in saving the cult from destruction. He participates in various battles against Yuan forces and eventually helps Zhu Yuanzhang establish the Ming dynasty.

== Martial arts ==
Chang Yuchun is said to be the creator of the martial art "Kaiping spear method".

== Discourse on Chang Yuchun's religion and ethnicity ==
Chang's religion and ethnic background is a controversial issue in Chinese historian circles. According to Bai Shouyi, Fu Tongxian, Jin Jitang, Ma Yiyu and Qiu Shusen (all Hui people except Qiu), Chang was from the Hui ethnic group. Tan Ta Sen and Dru C. Gladney also argued that Chang was Hui or Muslim. Wen Yong-ning argued that Chang might not be Hui, based on Chang's family traditions and offspring and the status of the Semu in the Yuan dynasty. In a later paper, Li Jianbiao mentioned that Wen's work was speculative and not convincing. Also, According to Chen Wutong, Wu Han, Wang Ting, Di Yongjun, Zhang Hongchao and Shang Chuan, Chang was not Hui.

== See also ==
- Tomb of Chang Yuchun
