= Xu Da =

Chinese military general and official (1332–1385)

- 徐達
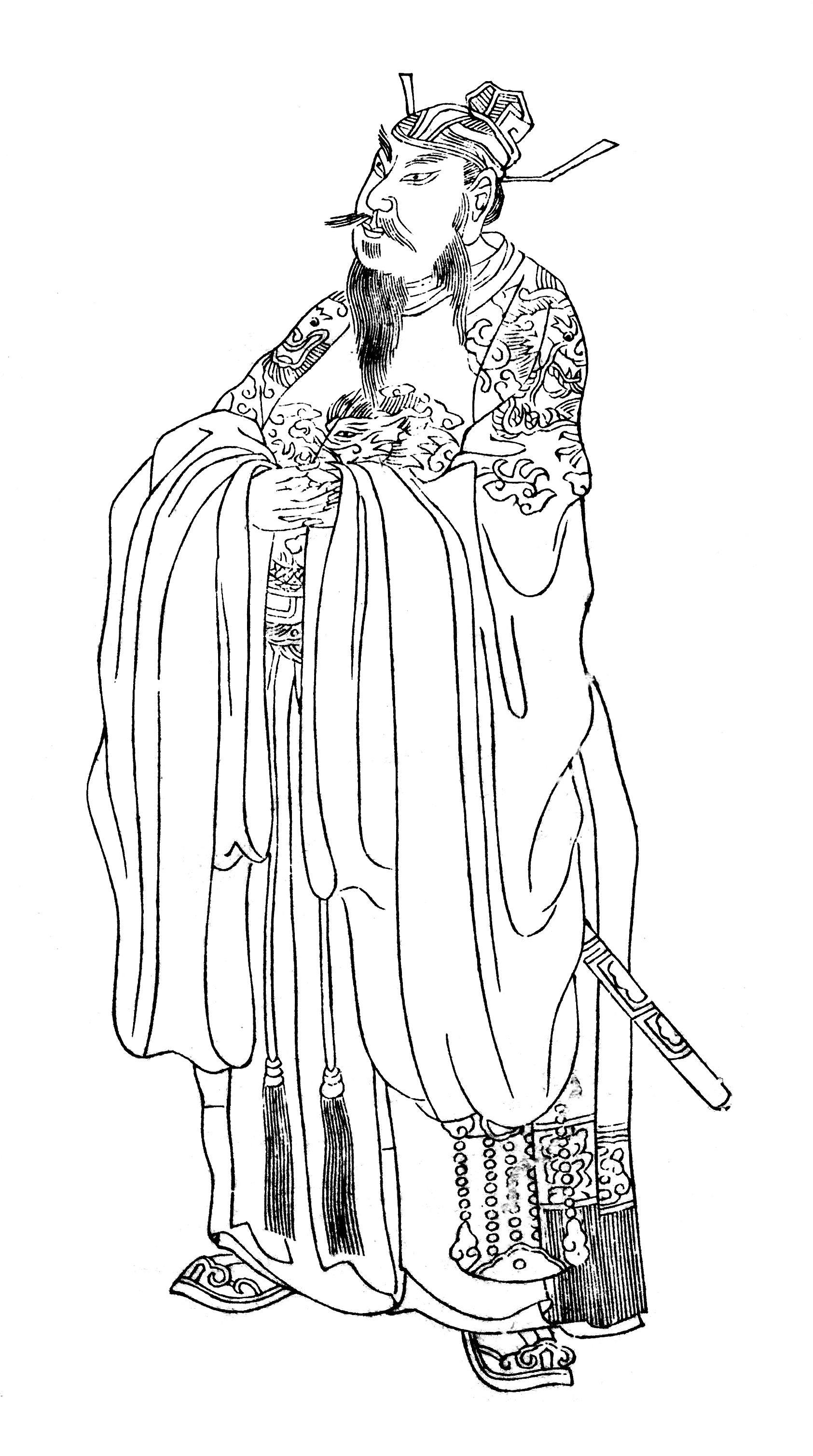
- Portrait of Xu Da

Left Grand Councilor
- In office 1371–1371
- Preceded by: Li Shanchang
- Succeeded by: Hu Weiyong

Right Grand Councilor
- In office 1368–1371
- Preceded by: Office established
- Succeeded by: Wang Guangyang

Duke of Wei
- In office 1370–1385
- Succeeded by: Xu Huizu

Personal details
- Born: 1332; Yuan Zhishun 3 (元至順三年) Yongfeng Township, Zhongli County, Hao Prefecture, Anfeng Lu, Henan Jiangbei Province
- Died: 1385 (aged 52–53); Ming Hongwu 18 (明洪武十八年) Yingtian Prefecture
- Spouses: Lady Zhang; Lady Xie
- Children: Xu Huizu, Duke of Wei; Xu Tianfu; Xu Zengshou, Duke of Ding; Xu Yihua, Empress Renxiaowen; Princess Consort of Dai; Princess Consort of An; Xu Yingxu; Xu Miaojin

Xu Da (1332–1385), courtesy name Tiande, known by his title as Duke of Wei (魏國公), later posthumously as Prince of Zhongshan (中山王), was a Chinese military general and official who lived in the late Yuan dynasty and early Ming dynasty. He was a friend of the Hongwu Emperor, the founder and first ruler of the Ming dynasty, and assisted him in overthrowing the Mongol-led Yuan dynasty and establishing the Ming dynasty. He was also the father of Empress Xu, father-in-law of the Yongle Emperor, and maternal grandfather of the Hongxi Emperor. All but two subsequent Ming and Southern Ming emperors were descended from him.

Xu Da was cautious and skilled in governing the army, making outstanding contributions to the establishment of the Ming dynasty and the recovery of Chinese territory. Zhu Yuanzhang praised him as "the Great Wall" of Ming. After his death, Xu Da was posthumously honored as "Prince of Zhongshan" (中山王), ranking first in the Imperial Ancestral Temples and Portrait Temples of Meritorious Officials.

== Biography ==
Xu Da was described as a stalwart man with a slim face and high cheekbones, he joined the Red Turban rebels in 1353 to overthrow the Mongol-led Yuan dynasty in China. Xu served as a general under Zhu Yuanzhang, a prominent rebel leader, and assisted him in defeating other rival warlords and opposing forces. In 1368, the year when the Ming dynasty was founded, Xu Da and other Ming generals led an attack on Khanbaliq (present-day Beijing), the Yuan capital, and forced the last Yuan ruler, Toghon Temür, to flee northward.

Xu Da led a pursuit on the retreating Yuan forces. Afterwards, Xu Da's army entered Mongol territory, routed Mongol reinforcements, sacked the Mongol capital at Karakorum, and captured thousands of Mongol nobles in 1370. His army ventured to Transbaikalia and reached further north than any other Chinese army had ever before.

Xu Da contracted carbuncle in 1384 and died in 1385 of illness. He was not accused of plotting an assassination on the Hongwu Emperor – although many other generals who contributed heavily to the founding of the Ming dynasty were put to death by the emperor for allegedly plotting rebellions. There are some legends that state that Xu Da was allergic to goose, so the Hongwu Emperor sent him a goose dish and ordered the emissary to ensure that Xu ate it and died. However, this legend came to be after his death and is not corroborated by contemporary sources, which say his relationship with the Hongwu emperor was strong until his death. His family was still very prominent in the Ming dynasty and married heavily into the royal family.

== Family ==
- Lady, of the Zhang clan (張氏)
- Princess Consort of Zhongshan, of the Xie clan (中山王夫人 謝氏), daughter of Xie Zaixing (謝再興)
  - Xu Yihua, Empress Renxiaowen (仁孝文皇后 徐儀華; 5 March 1362 – 6 August 1407), 1st daughter
    - Married Zhu Di, 4th son of Hongwu Emperor, in 1736 and had issue (4 daughters and 3 sons)
  - Xu Huizu, Duke Zhongzhen of Wei (徐輝祖 忠贞魏国公; 1368–1407), 1st son
  - Xu Tianfu (徐添福), 2nd son
  - Xu Zengshou, Duke of Ding (徐增壽 定國公; d. 1402), 3rd son
  - Lady Xu, Princess Consort of Dai (徐氏 代王妃; d. 1427), 2nd daughter
    - Married Zhu Gui, 13th son of Hongwu Emperor, and had issue (3 sons)
  - Lady Xu, Princess Consort of An (徐氏 安王妃; d. 1449), 3rd daughter
    - Married Zhu Ying, Prince of An, 22nd son of Hongwu Emperor
- Lady, of the Sun clan (孫氏)
  - Xu Yingxu, General-in-chief (骠骑将军 徐膺緒; 1372 – 2 March 1416), 4th son
- Lady, of the Jia clan (賈氏)
  - Xu Miaojin (徐妙锦), 4th daughter

== Ancestry ==
Xu Wusi
Xu Siqi
Lady He
Xu Liusi
Lady Zhou
Xu Da (1332–1385)
Lady Cai

== In fiction ==
Xu Da appears as a minor character in Louis Cha's wuxia novel The Heaven Sword and Dragon Saber. As a member of the anti-Yuan Ming Cult, Xu Da participated actively in the rebellions to overthrow the Yuan dynasty under the leadership of Zhang Wuji. Zhang passes Xu the Book of Wumu, a text on military strategy written by the Song dynasty general Yue Fei. Xu benefits greatly from reading the book, becomes a brilliant military commander, and assists Zhu Yuanzhang in overthrowing the Yuan dynasty and establishing the Ming dynasty.

Xu also appeared as a character in Shelley Parker-Chan's historical fiction novels, She Who Became the Sun and He Who Drowned the World, although some of the events depicted in the novels were fictional and not based on real-life history.

Political offices
Preceded by Li Shanchang	Left Grand Councilor; 1371	Succeeded by Hu Weiyong
Preceded by First	Right Grand Councilor; 1368–1371	Succeeded by Wang Guangyang
Chinese royalty
Preceded by New title	Duke of Wei; 1370–1385	Succeeded by Xu Huizu
