= Hu Weiyong =

Ming dynasty official (died 1380)

- 胡惟庸

Left Grand Chancellor
- In office 1377–1380
- Preceded by: Xu Da
- Succeeded by: Office abolished

Right Grand Chancellor
- In office 1373–1377
- Preceded by: Wang Guangyang
- Succeeded by: Wang Guangyang

Personal details
- Born: Unknown Dingyuan County, Anhui
- Died: 12 February 1380 Nanjing

Chinese name
- Chinese: 胡惟庸
Transcriptions
Standard Mandarin
- Hanyu Pinyin: Hú Wéiyōng

Hu Weiyong (died 12 February 1380) was a Chinese official of the early Ming dynasty and a close adviser of the Hongwu Emperor. In the second half of the 1370s, he headed the civil administration of the empire. However, in 1380, he was accused of treason and executed. The subsequent purge cost the lives of tens of thousands of people.

== Biography ==
Hu was from Dingyuan County (present-day part of Chuzhou in Anhui Province). Little is known about his early life. In 1355, he joined the rebel army of Zhu Yuanzhang, one of the leaders of the Red Turban Rebellion in China during the late Yuan dynasty. With the support of his fellow native Li Shanchang, who had been one of Zhu Yuanzhang's most trusted Anhui advisors, he rose through the ranks and gained Zhu's favor.

In 1368, Zhu ascended the throne as the Hongwu Emperor and founded the Ming dynasty. At the time, his most trusted advisors were the generals Xu Da and Chang Yuchun, as well as Li Shanchang, of whom Hu was a follower. Hu served successively as assistant administrator of the Central Secretariat and vice administrator before being appointed right grand chancellor in 1373, following the dismissal of Wang Guangyang, a rival of Li. In 1377, Hu won great favor from the Emperor, and was promoted to left chancellor, with Wang as his right associate. However, officials reported to the Emperor that Hu had become increasingly arrogant and was abusing his position to expand his influence, form a faction, conspire against rival officials, and usurp imperial prerogatives.

In late 1379, Champa (present-day southern Vietnam) sent envoys to the Ming capital, Nanjing, but Hu failed to report their arrival, one of his duties. When the Emperor learned of this, he was enraged and berated Hu and Wang, who in turn blamed the Secretariat. The furious emperor then ordered the execution of Wang and the imprisonment of the officials involved. At the beginning of the following year, Tu Jie, a vice censor-in-chief who had been in contact with Hu and feared being implicated, accused him of attempting to overthrow the Emperor. Investigators soon constructed a picture of a conspiracy led by Hu, which, with the support of part of the army, as well as the Mongols and Japanese, aimed at a coup d'état, including the assassination of the Emperor. (Note: Another account claims that Hu Weiyong lured the Emperor to his residence under the pretext of showing him a newly discovered spring, intending to assassinate him. The plot was foiled when a eunuch alerted the Emperor, who then discovered hidden troops on Hu's property, leading to Hu's execution. Despite conflicting narratives, it is generally accepted that Hu consolidated power by placing his supporters in key positions, though whether he truly intended treason remains uncertain.) He was executed on 12 February 1380, along with the Censor-in-Chief Chen Ning. (Note: Tu Jie was also executed despite having reported the conspiracy. In subsequent investigations, Li Shanchang was also implicated and executed.) The purge continued; even distant relatives of the accused, their helpers and protégés, relatives of these protégés, and so on, a total of 30,000 to 40,000 people were killed.

The fall of Hu was accompanied by a reorganization of the highest state administration bodies. The Central Secretariat post was abolished and six ministries were directly subordinated to the emperor. The Chief Military Commission, which stood at the head of the armed forces, was divided into five independent commissions, and the Censorate was reorganized.
