= Timeline of Yunnan-Guizhou =

Historical events in Yunnan and Guizhou provinces of China

This is a timeline of Yunnan and Guizhou.

== 4th century BC ==
Year	Date	Event
328		Chu military commander Zhuang Qiao invades Yunnan and sets up the Dian Kingdom

== 2nd century BC ==
Year	Date	Event
135 BC		Tang Meng creates Jianwei Commandery (modern Zunyi)
122 BC		Emperor Wu of Han sends envoys to the southwest in search of a route to Daxia
111 BC		Zangke Commandery is created in modern Guiyang and Yelang is vassalized
109 BC		Han conquest of Dian: The Dian Kingdom and Tian Kingdom become Han vassals and Yizhou Commandery is created in modern Qujing

== 1st century BC ==
Year	Date	Event
86 BC		Rebellion occurs in the southwest
83 BC		Rebellion occurs in the southwest
27 BC		Aboriginals rebel in the southwest

== 1st century ==
Year	Date	Event
12		Aboriginals in Zangke Commandery (Guizhou) rebel
14		Aboriginals in Yi Province rebel
45		Aboriginals rebel in the southwest
51		An Ailao tribe defects to Han
57		Yongchang Commandery is created in modern Kachin State
69		An Ailao tribe defects to Han

== 2nd century ==
Year	Date	Event
107		Aboriginals rebel in the southwest
116		Aboriginals rebel in the southwest
123		Aboriginals rebel in the southwest
146		Policy of assimilation in the southwest is implemented through education programs
156		Aboriginals rebel in the southwest
159		Aboriginals rebel in the southwest
176		Aboriginals rebel in the southwest

== 3rd century ==
Year	Date	Event
225		Zhuge Liang's Southern Campaign: Zhuge Liang conquers Nanzhong

== 4th century ==
Year	Date	Event
338		Cuan Chen of the Cuanman gains control over Yunnan

== 6th century ==
Year	Date	Event
570		Cuan Zan splits his realm into the Wuman/Black Mywa, ruled by his son Cuan Zhen, in the east and the Baiman/White Mywa, ruled by his eldest son Cuan Wan, in the west
593		The Cuanman rebel in Yunnan
597		A campaign is launched against the Cuanman

== 7th century ==
Year	Date	Event
602		Sui defeats the Cuanman

== 8th century ==
Year	Date	Event
703		Tridu Songtsen of the Tibetan Empire subjugates the White and Black Mywa
737		Piluoge (皮羅閣) unites the six zhaos (kingdoms) of the White Mywa with Tang support
751		Xianyu Zhongtong attacks Nanzhao with an army of 80,000 but is utterly defeated, losing three quarters of his original force
754		Yang Guozhong invades Nanzhao but fails to engage with the enemy until supplies ran out, at which time they were attacked and routed

== 9th century ==
Year	Date	Event
801		Tang and Nanzhao defeat Tibetan Empire and their Abbasid slave soldiers
829		Nanzhao takes Chengdu and captures 20,000 Chinese engineers
846		Nanzhao raids Annam
861		Nanzhao attacks Bo Prefecture and Annam but is repulsed.
863		Nanzhao conquers Annam
866		Gao Pian retakes Annam from Nanzhao
869		Nanzhao lays siege to Chengdu but fails to capture it
870		Nanzhao lays siege to Chengdu (in Sichuan)
877		Nanzhao retreats from Qianzhong Circuit in modern Guizhou

== 10th century ==
Year	Date	Event
902		Zheng Maisi murders the king of Nanzhao and sets up his own Dachanghe regime
928		Zhao Shanzhen kills the king of Dachanghe and sets up Datianxing
929		Yang Hefeng removes Zhao Shanzhen and sets up Dayining
937		Duan Siping defeats Dayining and creates the Dali Kingdom
967		Long Yanyao of Nanning, the Yang clan of Bo Prefecture, and the Tian clan of Si Prefecture submit to the Song dynasty in return for their autonomy
967		Song dynasty recognizes the Bole of the Luodian kingdom, the Mangbu of the Badedian kingdom, and the Awangren of the Yushi kingdom
975		Emperor Taizu of Song tries to convince Pugui of the Mu'ege Kingdom situated in northwest, central, east, and southeast Guizhou to acquiesce to Song overlordship
976		Song dynasty and aboriginal allies in Guizhou attack the Mu'ege Kingdom, forcing them to retreat to Dafang County
980		Long Yanyao's grandson Long Qiongju presents tribute to the Emperor Taizong of Song
995		Long Hanyao of Nanning presents tribute to the Song court
998		Long Hanyao of Nanning presents tribute to the Song court

== 11th century ==
Year	Date	Event
1042		Song dynasty appoints Degai of the Mu'ege Kingdom as regional inspector
1043		The Yao people of Guiyang rebel
1049		Nong Zhigao of the Zhuang people rebels in Guangnan West Circuit
1051		The Yao rebellion of Guiyang is suppressed
1053		Nong Zhigao's rebellion is suppressed

== 12th century ==
Year	Date	Event
1133		Ayong of the Mu'ege Kingdom leads a large trade delegation of several thousand to the Song city of Luzhou in Sichuan

== 13th century ==
Year	Date	Event
1208		Yao people rebel in Jinghu and are suppressed
1252	summer	Möngke Khan places Kublai Khan in charge of the invasion of the Dali Kingdom
1253	September	Kublai Khan's forces set up headquarters on the Jinsha River in western Yunnan and march on Dali in three columns
1254	January	The Dali Kingdom is conquered, although its dynasty remains in power, and the king, Duan Xingzhi, is later invested with the title of Maharajah by Möngke Khan; so ends the Dali Kingdom
1254	winter	Kublai Khan returns to Mongolia and leaves Subutai's son Uryankhadai in charge of campaigns against local Yi tribes
1257		Uriyangkhadai, son of Subutai, pacifies Yunnan and returns to Gansu
1257	winter	Mongol invasions of Vietnam: Uriyangkhadai returns to Yunnan and invades the Trần dynasty of Đại Việt

== 14th century ==
Year	Date	Event
1332	March	War of the Two Capitals: Loyalist rebels in Yunnan are defeated
1360		Basalawarmi takes control of Yunnan
1381	December	Ming conquest of Yunnan: Ming forces take Qujing
1382	April	Ming conquest of Yunnan: Ming forces conquer Yunnan
1386	January	Ming–Mong Mao War: Si Lunfa of Mong Mao rebels
1388		Ming–Mong Mao War: Mong Mao is defeated by the Ming artillery corps utilizing volley fire
1389	January	Ming forces defeat Yi rebels in Yuezhou
1389	December	Ming–Mong Mao War: Si Lunfa surrenders to the Ming dynasty
1397	December	Ming–Mong Mao Intervention: Si Lunfa is deposed and requests Ming aid in restoring him to power
1398	January	Ming–Mong Mao Intervention: Si Lunfa is restored to power

== 15th century ==
Year	Date	Event
1438	8 December	Luchuan–Pingmian campaigns: Ming carries out a punitive expedition against Si Renfa of Mong Mao for attacking neighboring tusi, but fails to defeat him
1441	27 February	Luchuan–Pingmian campaigns: Ming forces attack Mong Mao
1442	January	Luchuan–Pingmian campaigns: Mong Mao is defeated but Si Renfa escapes to Ava
1443	March	Luchuan–Pingmian campaigns: Ming forces defeat Si Jifa but fail to capture him
1445	August	Luchuan–Pingmian campaigns: Ava hands over Si Renfa to Ming in return for their support in attacking Hsenwi
1446	January	Luchuan–Pingmian campaigns: Si Renfa is executed
1449	March	Luchuan–Pingmian campaigns: Ming forces invade Mong Yang for harboring Si Jifa, but he manages to escape again
1450		Miao rebellions under the Ming dynasty: Yao and Miao people rebel in Guizhou and Huguang
1452		Miao rebellions under the Ming dynasty: Yao and Miao rebels are suppressed
1456		Miao rebellions under the Ming dynasty: Miao people in Huguang rebel and are suppressed
1464		Hou Dagou of the Yao people rebels in Guangxi
1466	January	Ming forces defeat and capture Hou Dagou, but the rebellion continues anyway
1466		Miao rebellions under the Ming dynasty: Miao people rebel in Hunan as well as the Sichuan-Guizhou border and are suppressed
1475		Miao rebellions under the Ming dynasty: Miao people rebel in Hunan and are suppressed
1479		Miao rebellions under the Ming dynasty: Miao people rebel in Sichuan
1499		Yi people rebel in Guizhou

== 16th century ==
Year	Date	Event
1502		Yi rebels in Guizhou are suppressed
1589		Bozhou rebellion: Miao people rebel in Bozhou
1592	14 July	Ordos Campaign: Ye Mengxiong brings cannons and additional Miao troops to the siege of Ningxia
1594		Bozhou rebellion: Ming forces are defeated in Sichuan
1598		Bozhou rebellion: The Miao rebellion is suppressed

== 17th century ==
Year	Date	Event
1606		Army officers in Yunnan riot and kill Yang Rong, a eunuch superintendent of mining
1621	fall	She-An Rebellion: Yi people rebel in Sichuan and Guizhou
1623		She-An Rebellion: Ming forces are defeated
1624		She-An Rebellion: Ming forces defeat rebels but are unable to decisively quell the rebellion
1629		She-An Rebellion: The rebels are defeated
1656	March	The Yongli Emperor arrives in Yunnan
1657	October	Sun Kewang's forces are defeated by Li Dingguo in eastern Yunnan and he retreats to Guizhou
1659	7 January	Qing forces advance into Yunnan and the Yongli Emperor flees to Toungoo dynasty
1659	10 March	Qing forces capture Yongchang and defeat Li Dingguo's army, securing Yunnan

== Gallery ==
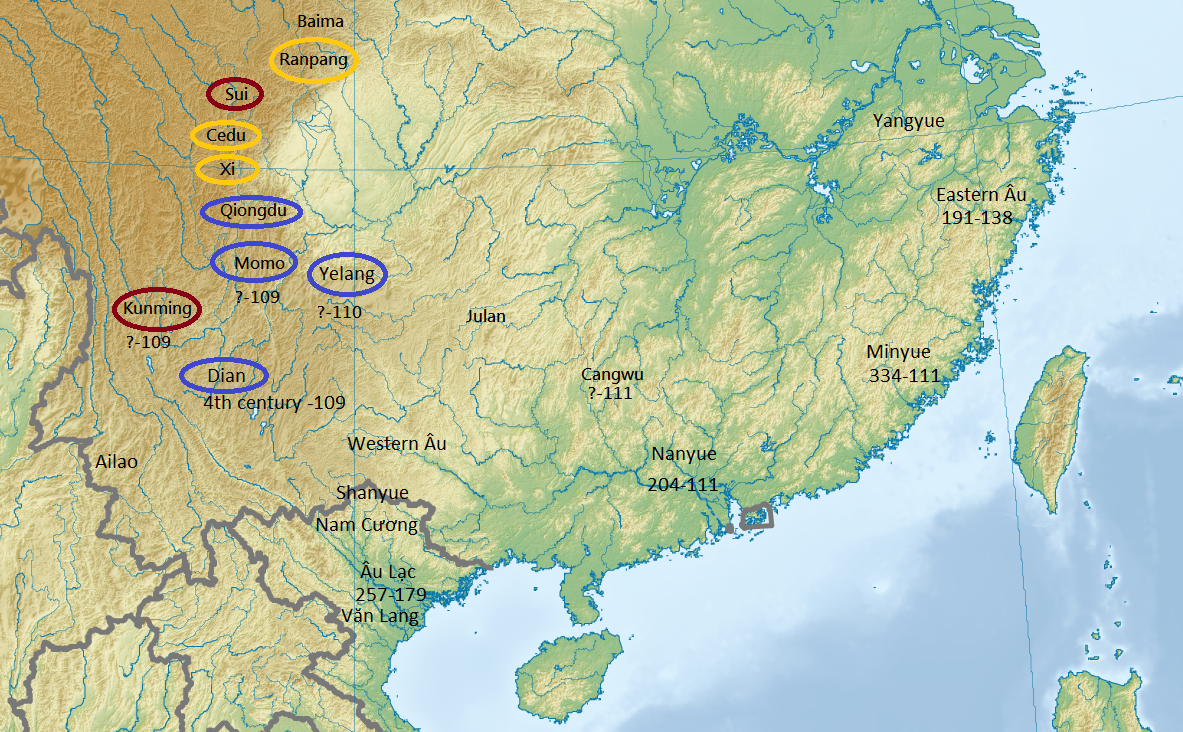
Ancient southern China

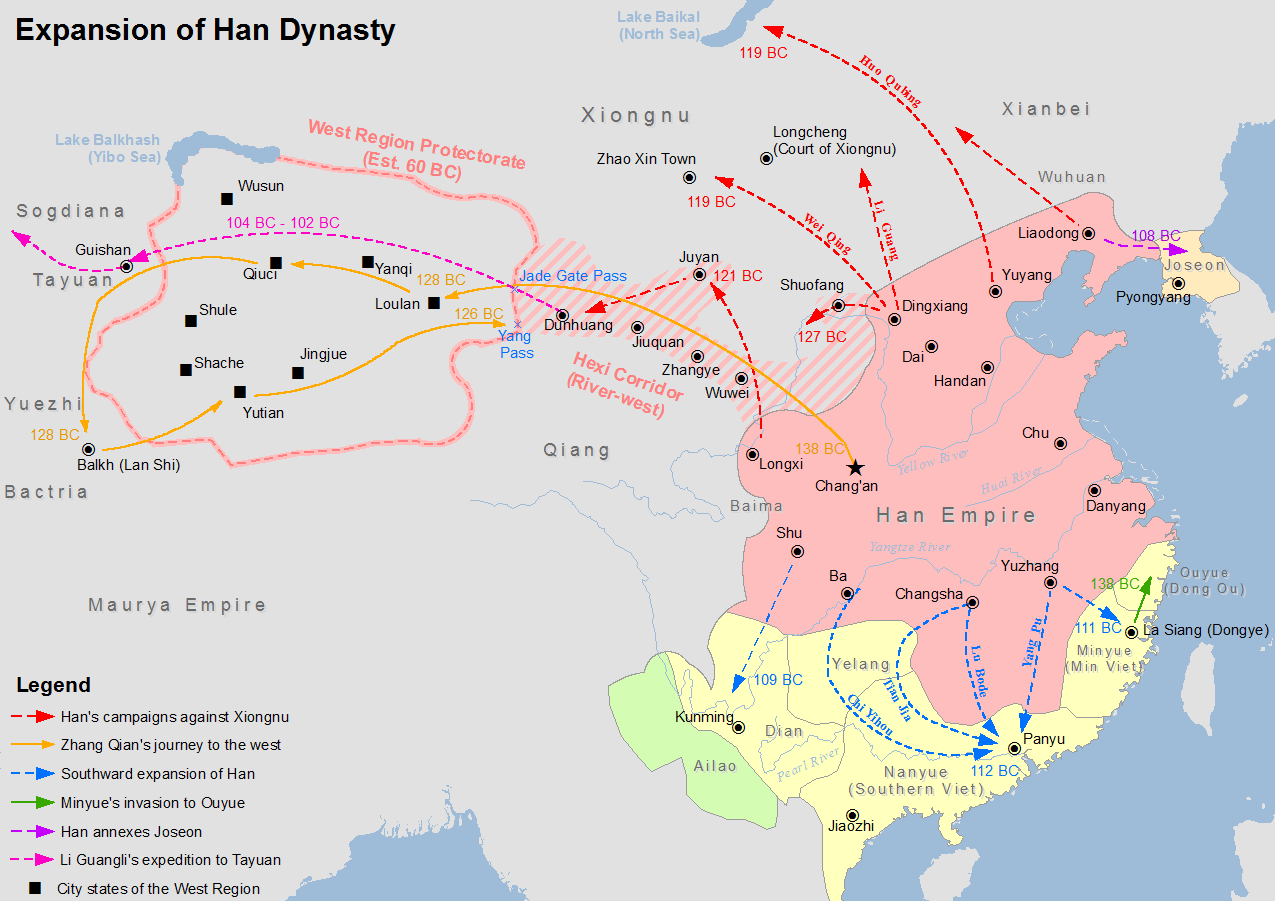
Han conquest of Dian, 109 BC

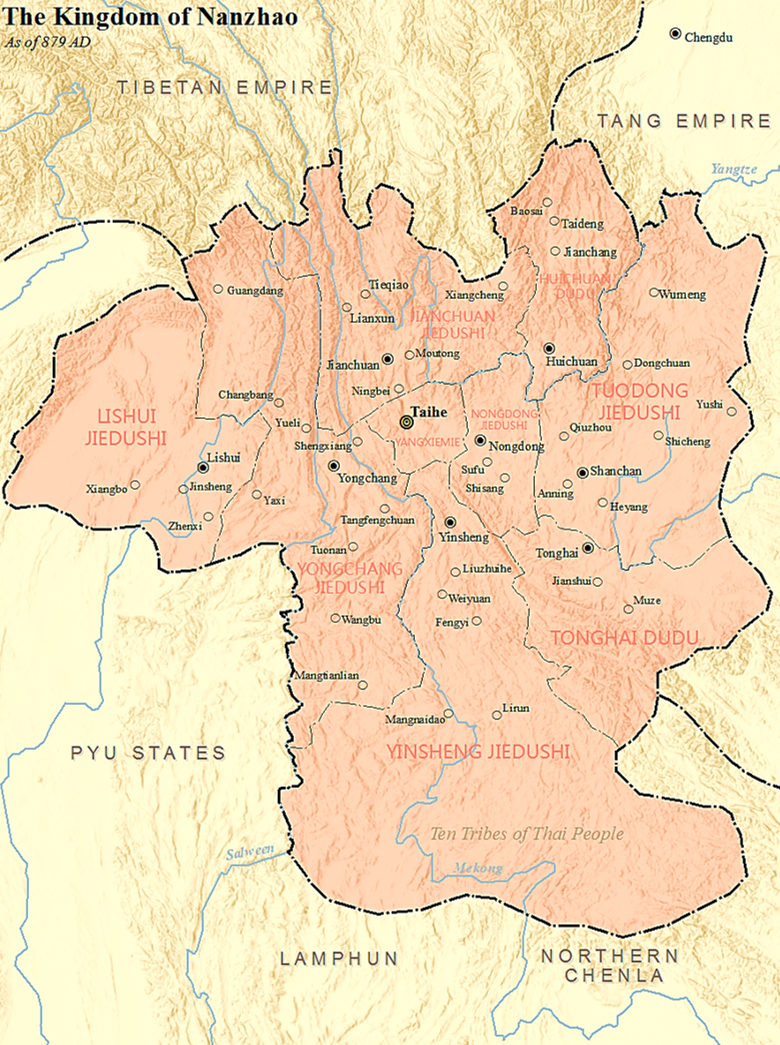
Nanzhao, 879

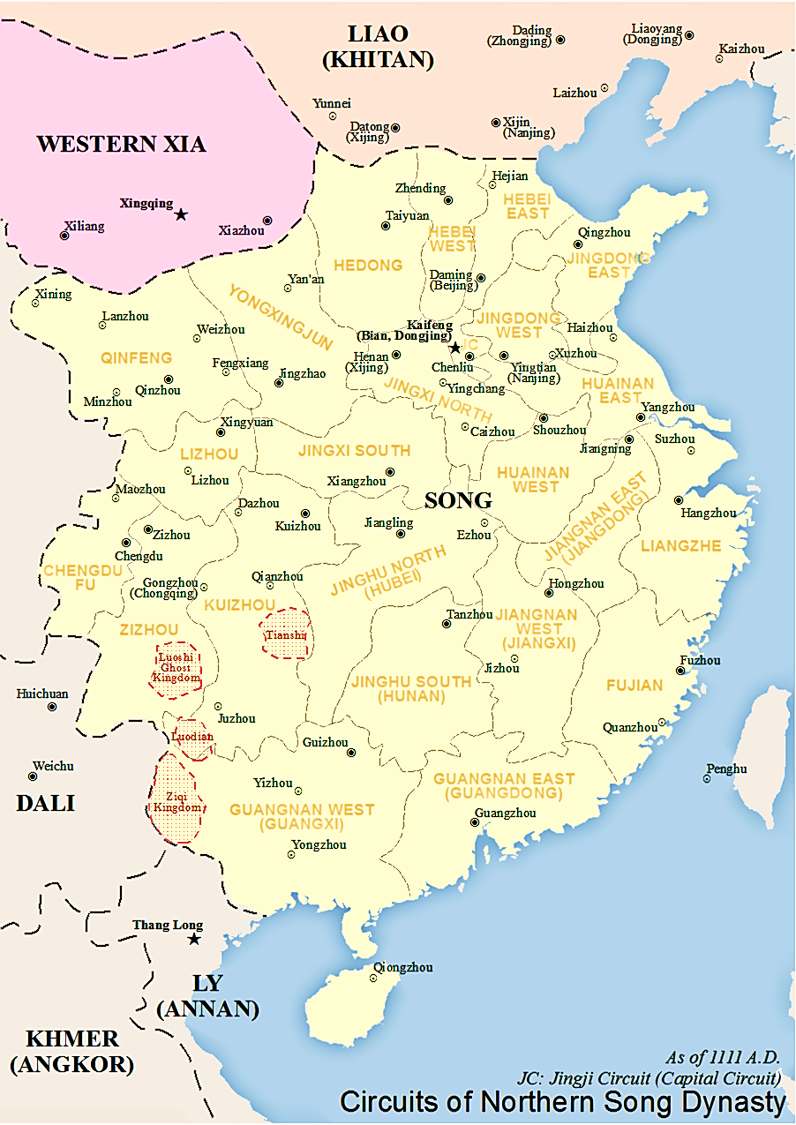
Song dynasty, 1111

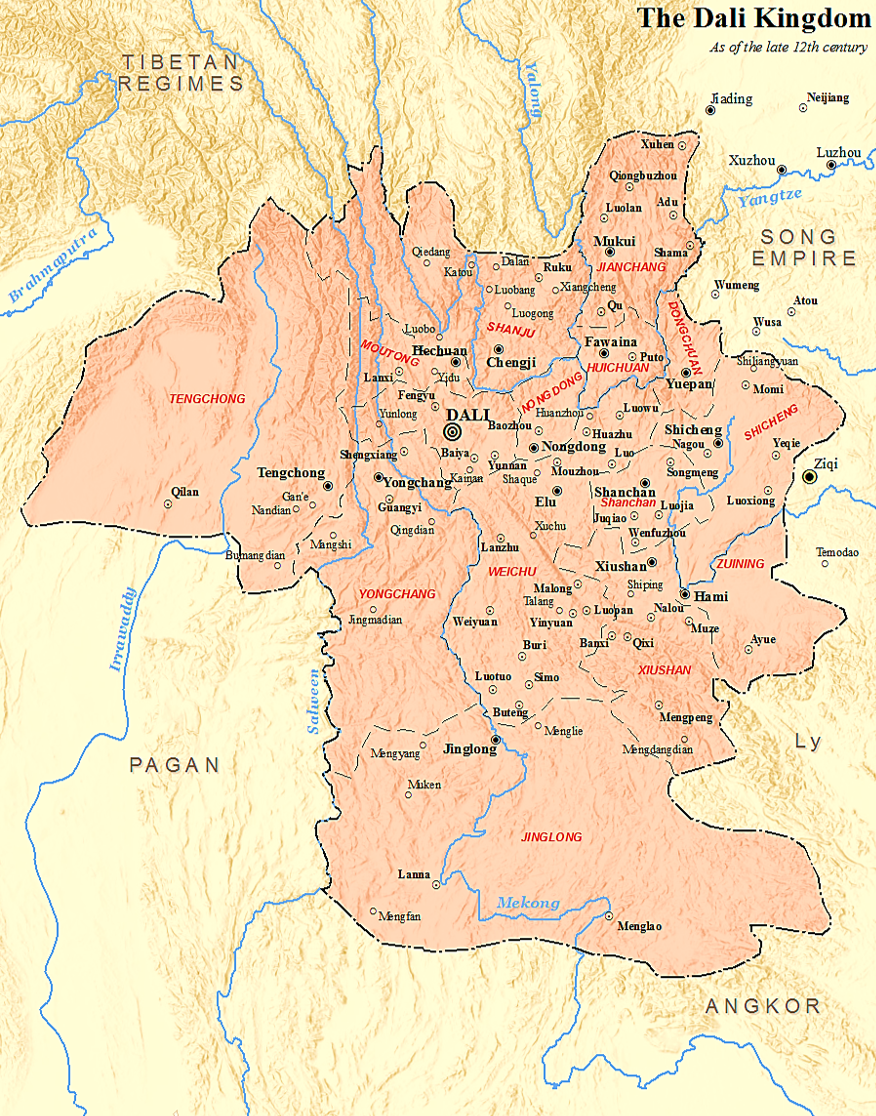
Dali Kingdom, late 12th century

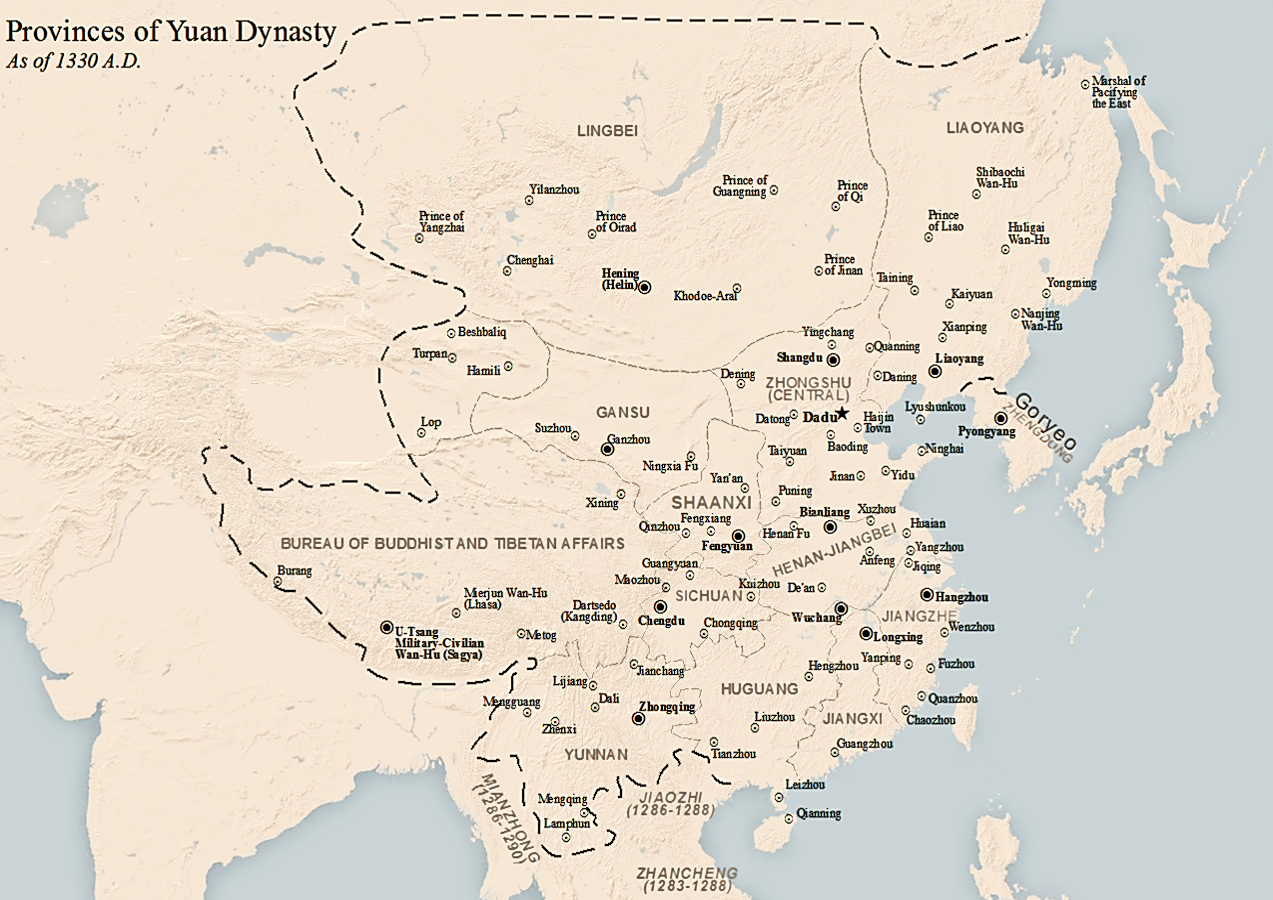
Yuan dynasty, 1330

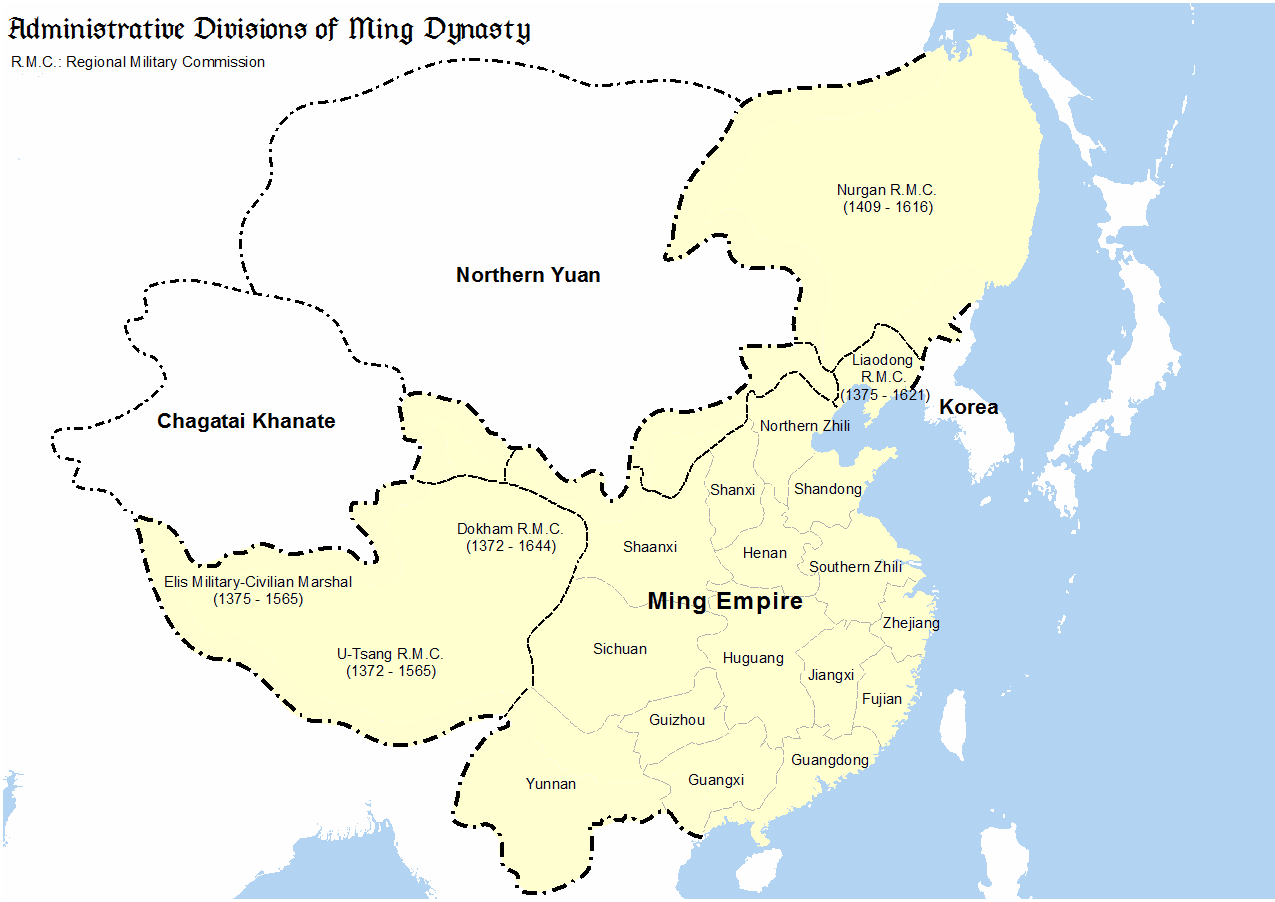
Ming dynasty

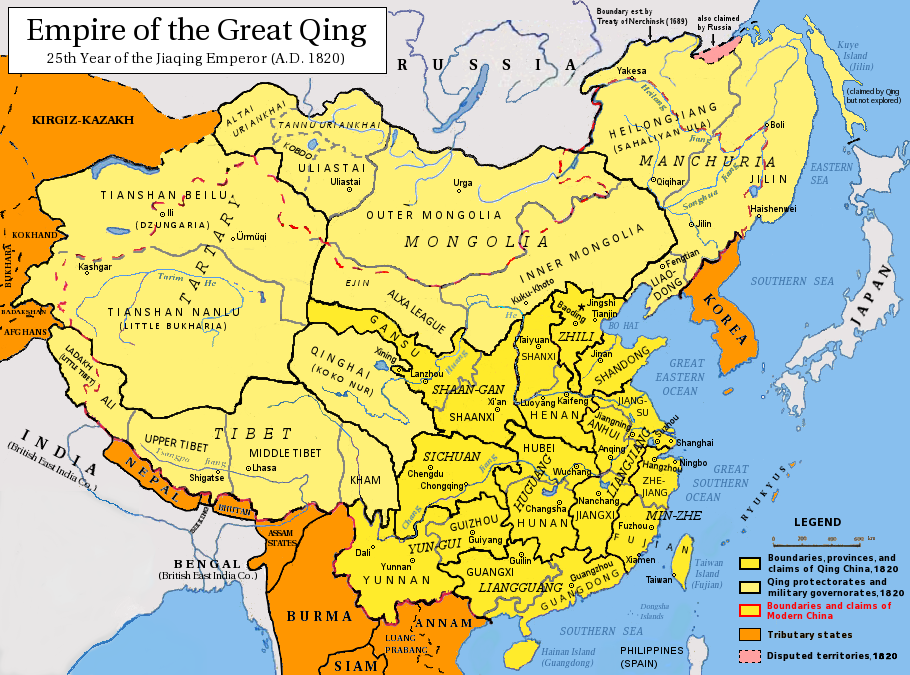
Qing dynasty, 1820

== Bibliography ==
- Andrade, Tonio (2016), The Gunpowder Age: China, Military Innovation, and the Rise of the West in World History, Princeton University Press, ISBN 978-0-691-13597-7.
- Beckwith, Christopher I (1987), The Tibetan Empire in Central Asia: A History of the Struggle for Great Power among Tibetans, Turks, Arabs, and Chinese during the Early Middle Ages, Princeton University Press
- Crespigny, Rafe (2007), A Biographical Dictionary of Later Han to the Three Kingdoms (23-220 AD), Brill
- Dardess, John (2012), Ming China 1368-1644 A Concise History of A Resilient Empire, Rowman & Littlefield Publishers, Inc.
- Fernquest, John (2006), Crucible of War: Burma and the Ming in the Tai Frontier Zone (1382-1454)
- Graff, David A. (2002), Medieval Chinese Warfare, 300-900, Warfare and History, London: Routledge, ISBN 0415239559
- Graff, David Andrew (2016), The Eurasian Way of War Military Practice in Seventh-Century China and Byzantium, Routledge, ISBN 978-0-415-46034-7.
- Herman, John E. (2007), Amid the Clouds and Mist China's Colonization of Guizhou, 1200–1700, Harvard University Asia Center, ISBN 978-0-674-02591-2
- Lewis, James (2015), The East Asian War, 1592-1598: International Relations, Violence and Memory, Routledge
- Liew, Foon Ming (1996), The Luchuan-Pingmian Campaigns (1436-1449) in the Light of Official Chinese Historiography
- Mote, F. W. (2003), Imperial China: 900–1800, Harvard University Press, ISBN 978-0674012127
- Swope, Kenneth M. (2009), A Dragon's Head and a Serpent's Tail: Ming China and the First Great East Asian War, 1592-1598, University of Oklahoma Press.
- Swope, Kenneth (2014), The Military Collapse of China's Ming Dynasty, Routledge
- Taylor, K.W. (2013), A History of the Vietnamese, Cambridge University Press
- Twitchett, Denis (1994), The Cambridge History of China, Volume 6, Alien Regime and Border States, 907-1368, Cambridge: Cambridge University Press, ISBN 0521243319
- Twitchett, Denis (1998), The Cambridge History of China Volume 7 The Ming Dynasty, 1368—1644, Part I, Cambridge University Press
- Twitchett, Denis (1998b), The Cambridge History of China Volume 8 The Ming Dynasty, 1368—1644, Part 2, Cambridge University Press
- Twitchett, Denis (2008), The Cambridge History of China 1, Cambridge University Press
- Twitchett, Denis (2009), The Cambridge History of China Volume 5 The Sung dynasty and its Predecessors, 907-1279, Cambridge University Press
- Wang, Zhenping (2013), Tang China in Multi-Polar Asia: A History of Diplomacy and War, University of Hawaii Press
- Watson, Burton (1993), Records of the Grand Historian by Sima Qian: Han Dynasty II (Revised Edition, Columbia University Press
- Xiong, Victor Cunrui (2009), Historical Dictionary of Medieval China, United States of America: Scarecrow Press, Inc., ISBN 978-0810860537
- Yang, Bin (2008a), "Chapter 3: Military Campaigns against Yunnan: A Cross-Regional Analysis", Between Winds and Clouds: The Making of Yunnan (Second Century BCE to Twentieth Century CE), Columbia University Press
- Yang, Bin (2008b), "Chapter 4: Rule Based on Native Customs", Between Winds and Clouds: The Making of Yunnan (Second Century BCE to Twentieth Century CE), Columbia University Press
- Yang, Bin (2008c), "Chapter 5: Sinicization and Indigenization: The Emergence of the Yunnanese", Between Winds and Clouds: The Making of Yunnan (Second Century BCE to Twentieth Century CE), Columbia University Press
