= Si Jifa =

Ruler of Möng Mao and Möng Yang
- Reign: Möng Mao: 1442–1444; Möng Yang: 1444–1450
- Predecessor: Möng Mao: Si Renfa; Möng Yang: Chao Pem Pha
- Successor: Möng Mao: None; Möng Yang: Si Lufa
- Died: 1454; Beijing
- Issue: Ai Zhun (哀准) and Han Gai (菡盖)
- Father: Si Renfa

Si Jifa (? – September 2, 1454; Chinese: 思機發; Tai Nüa: ᥔᥫᥴ ᥐᥤ ᥜᥣᥳ), was the ruler of Möng Mao from 1442 to 1444. The Ming dynasty's continued campaigns against Möng Mao forced him to flee to Möng Yang, where he ruled from 1444 to 1450. Following the final Luchuan-Pingmian Campaign, which ended in defeat, Si Jifa was captured and executed in Beijing.

== Name ==
Si Jifa's name is recorded differently across languages. Chinese records such as the History of Ming and Ming Veritable Records refer to him as Si Jifa (思機發). This name is also rendered in English as Sz-ki-fah. Burmese records such as the Hmannan Yazawin refer to him as Tho Kyein Bwa (သိုကျိန်ဘွား). Tai-Shan records call him Sao Hki, Chau Si Pha, and Sookeepha.

== Reign ==
=== In Möng Mao ===
Si Renfa, Si Jifa's father, was defeated by the Ming dynasty in the Luchuan-Pingmian Campaigns of 1441, and fled to Möng Yang with Si Jifa. In 1442, Si Jifa returned to Selan (Zhelan 者藍, also စယ်လန့် in Burmese), the former capital of Möng Mao.

Si Jifa sought to personally present himself at the Ming court to show his submission and atonement, and first sent his younger brother Zhao Sai (招賽) to present tribute in February 1443. However, the ruler of Mangshi, Dao Fangge (刀放革), a former subordinate of Möng Mao, defected to the Ming at this time. Si Jifa then ordered Meng Che (孟車) to attack Dao Fangge, but he was defeated by Ming forces and Si Jifa was forced to flee to Möng Yang. The Ming court considered Si Jifa untrustworthy, wavering between submission and rebellion. In June 1443, the Ming ordered Wang Ji and Jiang Gui to lead 50,000 troops against Möng Mao. In August 1443, Si Jifa returned to Möng Mao and sent letters to the Ming troops stationed in Jinchi (Baoshan), expressing his willingness to submit. He subsequently dispatched his headman Dao Longzhou (刀籠肘) together with his son Ai Zhun (哀准) to Jinchi to formally surrender. Wang Ji outwardly accepted Dao Longzhou’s proposal, allowing him to return to Si Jifa to placate him and prevent another escape, but sent Ai Zhun on to Beijing. Wang Ji attacked Zhelan in March 1444, Si Jifa fled but his wife and more than 90 of his followers were captured.

=== In Möng Yang ===
After fleeing to Möng Yang, he began to consolidate his own power and established a power base in the region. He repeatedly petitioned to the Ming court for mercy, sending his headman Dao Mengyong (刀孟永) with tribute and lamenting in desperate terms that he had “no place left to flee from death” and only “to beg for the mere preservation of his life.” The Zhengtong Emperor accepted his tribute, pardoned him from execution, and ordered him to personally come to the capital to offer his apology. The emperor promised that if Si Jifa complied, he would be reappointed as a native official, but if he hesitated, the Ming would launch another campaign against Möng Yang.

In April 1447, Mu Bin dispatched envoys to proclaim an imperial summons to Si Jifa, promising promotion and rewards. But Si Jifa dared not go to the Ming court as his younger brother Zhao Sai and his son Ai Zhun had not yet been returned. The Ming court had originally settled Zhao Sai in Yunnan, but he was ordered to Beijing in July 1447 since his follower Juan Mengche (涓孟車) had participated in a rebellion. He was permitted to be a chieftain, received a monthly grain salary and housing, and was placed under the jurisdiction of the Embroidered Uniform Guard, partly in hopes of luring Si Jifa into submission. At this time, however, because Si Jifa had plundered cattle, horses, and treasure from Ava, the Burmese prepared to attack him. The Ming court also ordered the native Möng Yang chief to capture Si Jifa, but the chief refused. This enraged a powerful eunuch, Wang Zhen, who became determined to destroy the Si family.

In April 1448, the Zhengtong Emperor ordered Wang Ji to lead 130,000 troops to against Si Jifa. Si Jifa fortified his position on the western bank of the Irrawaddy River with cheval de frise and other defenses. The Ming troops advanced downstream to Kaungton, crossed the river on floating bridges, and, together with Burmese and Hsenwi forces, stormed Si Jifa’s fort and seized 400,000 piculs of stored grain. They then destroyed his fortified camps at Guiku Mountain (鬼哭山) and Mang'ai Mountain (芒崖山), but Si Jifa and his younger brother Si Bufa evaded capture. In the wake of the Tumu Crisis on the northern Ming frontier, most Ming forces returned home and the task of finding Si Jifa was left to Narapati I of Ava, who was promised recognition of his claim over Möng Yang as a reward.

== Death ==
In 1450, Thihapate of Mohnyin, a prince of Ava stationed in Möng Yang, died and was succeeded by his son Min Uti, who joined forces with Si Jifa and Si Bufa and rebelled against Ava. When Min Uti was defeated by Ava forces, Si Jifa and Si Bufa met with the king of Ava in Katha to pay homage, claiming that they had refused to support Min Uti. Si Bufa and his sons were soon allowed to return to Möng Yang, but Si Jifa was kept as a captive in Ava.

Narapati was hesitant to hand over Si Jifa until receiving the territory promised to him. The Vice Commander Hu Zhi (胡誌) made the handover of Yinjia (銀戞) and other places in April 1454, then Ava handed over 6 people including Si Jifa and his family at Jinshajiang Village (金沙江村 lit. 'Irrawaddy River Village'). Upon receiving them, Hu Zhi escorted them to the Ming capital. Si Jifa arrived in the capital on August 30th, 1454, and was executed a few days later on September 2nd.

== Bibliography ==
- Elias, N. (1876). Introductory Sketch of the History of the Shans in Upper Burma and Western Yunnan. Calcutta: Foreign Department Press.
- Fernquest, Jon (Autumn 2006). "Crucible of War: Burma and the Ming in the Tai Frontier Zone (1382–1454)". SOAS Bulletin of Burma Research. 4 (2).
- Gu Yingtai [谷應泰] (1977) [1658]. 明史纪事本末 [Mingshi Jishi Benmo (An Account of Events of the Ming Dynasty in Their Entirety)] (in Chinese). Beijing: Zhonghua Book Company.
- Parker, Edward Harper (1893). Burma: With Special Reference to Her Relations with China. Rangoon: Rangoon Gazetee.
- Pemberton, R. Boileau (1835). Report on the Eastern Frontier of British India. Calcutta: Baptist Mission Press.
- Royal Historical Commission of Burma (2003) [1832]. Hmannan Yazawin (in Burmese). Yangon: Ministry of Information, Myanmar.
- Scott, J.G (1900). Gazetteer of Upper Burma and the Shan States. Part 1, Volume 1. Rangoon: Superintendent, Government Printing, Burma.
- Sun, Jizong, ed. (1968) [1467]. 明英宗实录 [Yingzong Veritable Records] (in Chinese). Taipei: Institute of History and Philology, Academia Sinica.
- Zhang, Tingyu, ed. (1974) [1739]. 明史 [History of Ming] (in Chinese). Beijing: Zhonghua Book Company.

Preceded by Si Renfa	Ruler of Möng Mao; 1442–1444	Succeeded by Möng Mao abolished
Preceded by Chao Pem Pha	Ruler of Möng Yang; 1444–1450	Succeeded by Si Lufa
