= Si Renfa =

Ruler of Möng Mao (1413 to 1442)

Ruler of Möng Mao
- Reign: 1413–1442
- Predecessor: Si Hangfa
- Successor: Si Jifa
- Died: 1446; Burma
- Issue: Si Jifa, Si Bufa, Si Lufa, and Zhao Sai (招賽)
- Father: Si Lunfa

Si Renfa (?–1446; Chinese: 思任發; Tai Nüa: ᥔᥫᥴ ᥕᥪᥢ ᥜᥣᥳ), was the ruler of Möng Mao from 1413 to 1442. During his reign, he repeatedly attempted to recover Möng Mao's former territory from the Ming dynasty, ultimately leading to the Luchuan–Pingmian Campaigns and the fall of Möng Mao.

== Name ==
Si Renfa's name is recorded differently across languages. Chinese records such as the History of Ming and Ming Veritable Records refer to him as Si Renfa (思任發). This name is also rendered in English as Sz-jên-fah. Burmese records such as the Hmannan Yazawin refer to him as Tho Ngan Bwa (သိုငံဘွား). Tai-Shan records call him Hsö Ngan Pha (Tai Nüa: ᥔᥫᥴ ᥒᥛᥰ ᥜᥣᥳ), as well as Sao Ngan Hpa, and Chau Ngan Pha, where Sao/Chau is an abbreviation of Chaopha. English sources have also romanized Hsö Ngan Pha as Soognampha, Sugnamphâ, and Sungamphâ.

Due to variations in nomenclature among sources and temporal discrepancies in early historical records, certain historical works—for instance, Phayre’s History of Burma—have erroneously regarded Sugnamphâ in Tai/Shan records and Tho Ngan Bwa in Burmese records as two separate individuals.

== Early life ==
Si Renfa was the son of Si Lunfa and the younger brother of the previous Möng Mao ruler, Si Hangfa. In 1397, Dao Ganmeng, a subordinate ruler of Hsenwi, rebelled in what became known as the Dao Ganmeng rebellion, driving Si Lunfa out of Möng Mao. At the time, Si Renfa was still a child, and he fled with his father to Yunnan where he was then kept as a political hostage, growing up in the residence of Mu Sheng, who treated him as a son. Eventually, Dao Ganmeng was ousted and Si Lunfa returned to Möng Mao, but he died soon after in 1399. After Si Hangfa succeeded to the throne, the Ming court took advantage of the chaos and established numerous Tusi polities subject to their own rule, of which the major ones included Hsenwi, Möng Yang, and Möng Ting. Si Hangfa was unable to cope with further attacks from Hsenwi and Möng Yang, and he abdicated in favour of Si Renfa in 1413.

== Reign ==
=== Expansion ===
As ruler, Si Renfa would attempt to reassert control over Ming territory by invading the neighbouring tusi polities which had previously been subordinate to Möng Mao. He simultaneously attempted to gain the favour of the Ming court, sending a total of 15 tribute missions between 1414 and 1440. In 1422, Si Renfa launched a military campaign against the neighbouring polity of Nandian, which then appealed to the Ming court for help. Si Renfa dispatched envoys to the Ming capital to present tribute and apologise. Afterwards, he turned southwards, contesting territory with Hsenwi. Both states lodged complaints to the Ming court, prompting the Xuande Emperor to send envoys to mediate the conflict.

Si Renfa gradually increased his military strength through years of preparation and recovery. In 1428, he launched further attacks on Nandian, Tengchong, and the Lujiang region. The Ming dynasty had just concluded its campaigns against the Lam Sơn uprising in Vietnam and the Songpan rebellion in Sichuan, leaving both the army and the populace exhausted. The Ming emperor rejected Mu Sheng’s proposal to mobilise 50,000 troops for a punitive expedition, declaring that armies would only be sent if absolutely necessary, and instead issued an imperial admonition to Si Renfa.

In 1430, Si Renfa occupied Möng Yang. In 1433, Hsenwi complained to the Ming court that Si Renfa had invading its territory, while Si Renfa countered that Hsenwi’s ruler, Han Menfa (罕門法), was invading his territory. The Ming court sent the eunuch Yun Xian (雲仙) to Möng Mao with gifts of banknotes and other valuables, and instructed Si Renfa to make peace with Hsenwi. In 1436, Si Renfa made a petition to the Ming court to have his debt of 2,500 taels (92 kilograms) of silver cancelled, claiming that Hsenwi’s incursions had caused his subjects to flee, which the young Zhengtong Emperor approved despite complaints from others in the court.

After a decade of attacking neighbouring polities without facing any punishment from the Ming court, and now with an ample supply of grain and manpower from Möng Yang, Si Renfa launched a large-scale campaign aiming to restore the extensive territory previously held by Si Kefa and Si Lunfa. In 1436, he dispatched troops to attack Möng Ting and Wandian, and the Ming court approved plans for a campaign against Möng Mao, but it ended up not happening. In 1437, he occupied areas under Nandian’s jurisdiction, including Luobosi Zhuang (羅卜思莊). In 1438, he launched further attacks on Nandian, Ganya, Tengchong, Lujiang, and Jinchi, constructing 300 boats on the Nu River to signal his intention to seize Yunlong.

=== Luchuan–Pingmian Campaigns ===
After seizing the territory of neighbouring polities, Si Renfa replaced Ming native officials with local rulers who were loyal to him, acts that were tantamount to rebellion. In response, the Ming court dispatched the generals Mu Sheng, Fang Zheng, and Mu Ang at the head of 39,000 troops to suppress him in 1438. Due to his personal relationship with Si Renfa, Mu Sheng was reluctant to resort to large-scale hostilities and hoped to bring him to submission through conciliation. He therefore sent Che Lin (車琳), a commander of the Jinchi Guard (金齒衛), to persuade Si Renfa to surrender. Si Renfa feigned submission, and Mu Sheng believed him, making no move to cross the river. Fang Zheng, greatly angered, refused to follow Mu Sheng’s command, and led his own troops across the river to engage Si Renfa’s general Mian Jian (緬簡). He pursued the army deep into Möng Mao's territory, as far as Kongni (空泥), and Fang’s forces were ambushed by a war elephant phalanx. The Ming forces suffered a crushing defeat, and Fang Zheng was killed in action.

After defeating the Ming army, Si Renfa advanced further, attacking Jingdong, Möng Ting, and Dahou. Several polities, including Möng Lem, surrendered to Möng Mao. In 1439, the Ming court again ordered Mu Ang to lead 100,000 troops in another campaign against Si Renfa, but this ended in another Möng Mao victory. The successive defeats strengthened the “pro-war” faction at the Ming court, prompting the Yingzong Emperor to send Wang Ji, the Minister of War, at the head of 150,000 troops on an expedition against Möng Mao.

The expedition was launched in 1441, and the Ming court called on Hsenwi, Ava, Chiang Hung, Lan Na, and other local states to mobilize their troops against Si Renfa. The Ming army first defeated the Möng Mao general Dao Lingdao (刀令道) at Dahou. Their forces then split into two columns, one captured Wandian and advanced to occupy Zhenkang and Möng Ting, the other seized Shangjiang Fort (上江寨), a key Möng Mao stronghold, before breaking through Si Renfa’s defensive works at Shamulong (杉木籠) and Ma’anshan (馬鞍山). In early December of 1441, the two columns converged at the Möng Mao capital for a decisive battle with Si Renfa. Defeated, Si Renfa fled with his family along a side route, crossing the Shweli River and escaping to Möng Yang.

== Death ==
In 1442, the Burmese Kingdom of Ava sent an expedition north to Möng Kawng against Si Renfa. Thihapate, the governor of Taungdwin, captured Si Renfa and presented him to Ava's king, Narapati. In March 1443, Narapati reported to the Ming court that he had taken Si Renfa prisoner and used this as leverage to demand territory as a reward. The Ming court agreed to cede Möng Mao lands near the Burmese border to Ava. Ava then declared that it would only hand over Si Renfa if the Ming first executed his son, Si Jifa.

In August 1443, the Ming court ordered Wang Ji to station his troops in Tengchong. Ava promised to deliver Si Renfa at Bhamo in the winter, but the handover ultimately failed. According to one account, when the Burmese arrived at the agreed location, they did not find the Ming general Guo Deng, with whom they had previously negotiated, and hesitated to proceed. Another account claims that although Ava had agreed to the handover, it was wavering in its intentions, and when the appointed date came, the Burmese did not show up. Subsequently, fighting broke out between the Ming and Burmese armies. The Ming forces were unable to secure victory, and the Burmese withdrew, taking the captive Si Renfa with them.

In August 1445, Narapati informed Mu Ang that he would hand over Si Renfa to the Ming at the end of October, on the condition that Miao Sang (眇䫙), a region of Hsenwi, be placed under Burmese administration. Hsenwi agreed to cede Miao Sang to Ava in exchange for Si Renfa. In January 1446, the Ming general-in-chief of Yunnan, Mu Bin, dispatched the qianhu (chiliarch) Wang Zheng (王政) to receive Si Renfa from Ava. Coincidentally, the day was marked by a solar eclipse, and the sky grew dark. A shaman predicted, “the heavenly army is coming.” Out of fear, Narapati abandoned any further attempts at extortion and handed over Si Renfa, with his wife, children, and a total of 32 family members, to Wang Zheng.

When Si Renfa was handed over to Wang Zheng, he had already been on a hunger strike and was on the verge of death. Wang Zheng then beheaded him, and his head was sent to the Ming capital. The historian Liew Foon Ming argues that, as a qianhu, Wang Zheng would not have dared to execute Si Renfa, whom the court had been hunting for in the past eight years, on his own initiative. It is likely, Liew suggests, that the Ming court was afraid that Si Jifa and his brothers would come to rescue their father and ordered the immediate execution.

=== Other Records ===
Some Chinese sources state that Yang Ning, the grand coordinator of Yunnan, promised the territory of Möng Yang to Ava. Narapati was greatly pleased with this, but feared retaliation from Si Jifa. Subsequently, Mu Bin dispatched the commander Li Ang (李昂) with troops to apply military pressure. As a result, Narapati beheaded Si Renfa and handed him over to the Ming court.

According to Burmese records, Narapati requested assistance from the Chinese army to suppress Minye Kyawhtin, a high-ranking Burmese official who had rebelled and occupied Yamethin. The Ming sent four ministers and 10,000 cavalrymen to Yamethin, and they peacefully accepted the surrender of Yamethin without a battle. When the Ming troops returned to Ava, Si Renfa had already committed suicide by poisoning himself. Narapati handed over Si Renfa’s body to the Chinese forces, who disemboweled him and then dried and preserved the corpse.

== Bibliography ==
- Bai Chuan [百川] (1986). "明代麓川之役述评" [A Review of the Luchuan-Pingmian Campaigns in the Ming Dynasty]. 思想战线 [Thinking] (in Chinese) (2): 56-61.
- Dehong Dai Studies Association [德宏州傣学学会], ed. (2005). 勐卯弄傣族历史研究 [The Historical Study of Möng Mao Lông] (in Chinese). Kunming: Yunnan Nationalities Publishing House. ISBN 7-5367-3158-2.
- Elias, N. (1876). Introductory Sketch of the History of the Shans in Upper Burma and Western Yunnan. Calcutta: Foreign Department Press.
- Fang Guoyu [方国瑜], ed. (1998). 云南史料丛刊·第四卷 [The Collected Historical Materials of Yunnan, Volume IV] (in Chinese). Kunming: Yunnan University Press. ISBN 7-81025-828-1.
- Fernquest, Jon (Autumn 2006). "Crucible of War: Burma and the Ming in the Tai Frontier Zone (1382–1454)". SOAS Bulletin of Burma Research. 4 (2).
- Gu Yingtai [谷應泰] (1977) [1658]. 明史纪事本末 [Mingshi Jishi Benmo (An Account of Events of the Ming Dynasty in Their Entirety)] (in Chinese). Beijing: Zhonghua Book Company.
- Hu, Guang, ed. (1968) [1418]. 明太祖实录 [Taizu Veritable Records] (in Chinese). Taipei: Institute of History and Philology, Academia Sinica.
- Liew, Foon Ming (1996). "The Luchuan-Pingmian Campaigns (1436–1449) in the Light of Official Chinese Historiography". Oriens Extremus. 39 (2): 162–203. JSTOR 24047471.
- Ni Tui [倪蜕] (1992) [1737]. Li Yan [李埏] (ed.). 滇云历年传 [Annals of Dian-Yun] (in Chinese). Kunming: Yunnan University Press. ISBN 7-81025-044-2.
- Parker, Edward Harper (1893). Burma: With Special Reference to Her Relations with China. Rangoon: Rangoon Gazetee.
- Pemberton, R. Boileau (1835). Report on the Eastern Frontier of British India. Calcutta: Baptist Mission Press.
- Phayre, Arthur P. (1883). History of Burma, including Burma proper, Pegu, Taunga Tenasserim, and Arakan, from the earliest time to the end of the first war with British India. London: Trübner & Co.
- Royal Historical Commission of Burma (2003) [1832]. Hmannan Yazawin (in Burmese). Yangon: Ministry of Information, Myanmar.
- Sai Aung Tun (2009). History of the Shan State: From Its Origins to 1962. Chiang Mai: Silkworm Books. ISBN 978-974-9511-43-5.
- Scott, J.G (1900). Gazetteer of Upper Burma and the Shan States. Part 1, Volume 1. Rangoon: Superintendent, Government Printing, Burma.
- Sun, Jizong, ed. (1968) [1467]. 明英宗实录 [Yingzong Veritable Records] (in Chinese). Taipei: Institute of History and Philology, Academia Sinica.
- Taw, Sein Ko (1899). Inscriptions of Pagan, Pinya and Ava: Translation, with Notes. Rangoon: Government Printing, Burma.
- Wan Kuiyi [万揆一] (1985). "明代麓川之役和《陈言征麓川略》" [The Luchuan-Pingmian Campaigns of the Ming Dynasty and A Petition on the Luchuan Expedition]. 贵州文史丛刊 [Guizhou Journal of Literature and History] (in Chinese) (2): 69-74. doi:10.14040/j.cnki.52-1004/k.1985.02.011.
- Yang, Shiqi, ed. (1968) [1430]. 明太宗实录 [Taizong Veritable Records] (in Chinese). Taipei: Institute of History and Philology, Academia Sinica.
- Yang, Shiqi, ed. (1968) [1438]. 明宣宗实录 [Xuanzong Veritable Records] (in Chinese). Taipei: Institute of History and Philology, Academia Sinica.
- Zhang, Tingyu, ed. (1974) [1739]. 明史 [History of Ming] (in Chinese). Beijing: Zhonghua Book Company.
- Zhang Zhichun [张志淳] (1999) [1526]. Li Dongping [李东平] (ed.). 南园漫录校注 [Nan Yuan Man Lu: Collated and Annotated Edition] (in Chinese). Kunming: Yunnan Nationalities Publishing House. ISBN 7-5367-1748-2.
- Zhuge Yuansheng (诸葛元声) (1994) [1618]. Liu Yachao [刘亚朝] (ed.). 滇史 [Dianshi (History of Yunnan)] (in Chinese). Mangshi: Dehong Nationalities Press. ISBN 7-80525-250-5.

Preceded by Si Hangfa	Ruler of Möng Mao; 1413–1442	Succeeded by Si Jifa
