= Thihapate of Mohnyin =

Historical Burmese ruler

Thihapate of Mohnyin မိုးညှင်း သီဟပတေ့

Sawbwa of Mohnyin
- Reign: 1439 – 1450/51
- Predecessor: unnamed
- Successor: Min Uti
- Monarch: Minye Kyawswa I of Ava (1439–1442); Narapati I of Ava (1442–1450/51)

Governor of Pakhan
- Reign: 1429 – 1450/51
- Predecessor: Thiri Zeya Thura the Elder
- Successor: Thihapate II of Pakhan
- Monarch: Mohnyin Thado (1429–1439); Minye Kyawswa I of Ava (1439–1442); Narapati I of Ava (1442–1450/51)

Governor of Pyinzi
- Reign: May 1426 – c. February 1434
- Predecessor: Letya Zeya Thingyan
- Successor: Thiri Zeya Thura the Younger
- Monarch: Mohnyin Thado (1426–1429)
- Born: c. 1410 c. 772 ME; Ava Kingdom
- Died: late 1450 or early 1451 late 812 ME; Mohnyin; Ava Kingdom
- Spouse: Shin Hla Myat of Pakhan
- Issue among others...: Min Uti of Mohnyin; Thihapate II of Pakhan; Ameitta Thiri Maha Dhamma Dewi of Ava
- Father: ?
- Mother: ?
- Religion: Theravada Buddhism

Thihapate of Mohnyin (Burmese: မိုးညှင်း သီဟပတေ့, [móɲ̥ɪ́ɴ θìha̰pətḛ]; also spelled Thihapatei of Mong Yang; c. 1410–1450/51) was sawbwa of Mohnyin from 1439 to 1450/51, and governor of Pakhan from 1429 to 1450/51. He is best remembered in Burmese history for declining to take the Ava throne in 1442, after the death of King Minye Kyawswa I of Ava. He was a principal figure in Ava's reconquest of Mohnyin (1439), Kale (1439) and Mogaung (1442), and defense of the northern frontier states from Chinese incursions in the 1440s.

He was the father of Queen Ameitta Thiri Maha Dhamma Dewi of Ava.

== Early life ==
The royal chronicles have no information about his background or early life except to mention in passing that he was a nephew of Queen Shin Myat Hla of Ava. Although it can be inferred from chronicle reporting that his parents were probably Thiri Zeya Thura the Elder and Shin Myat Hla of Pakhan, the narratives are not conclusive. (Note: Thiri Zeya Thura of Pakhan and Shin Myat Hla of Pakhan may have been his parents because: (1) Chronicles (Yazawin Thit Vol. 1 2012: 272) (Hmannan Vol. 2 2003: 61) mention only one sibling of Queen Myat Hla, her younger brother Thiri Zeya Thura, who was married to Shin Myat Hla, sister of Mohnyin Thado; (2) (Yazawin Thit Vol. 1 2012: 277) and (Hmannan Vol. 2 2003: 68): Thihapate succeeded Thiri Zeya Thura's fief at Pakhan in 1429, suggesting that he was a son (probably the eldest son) of Thiri Zeya Thura. However, the aforementioned reasons alone do not conclusively prove that the Duke and Duchess of Pakhan were his parents. First, Thihapate could have been born to another sibling of Queen Myat Hla not mentioned in the chronicles. Although chronicles mention only one brother of the queen, they do not say explicitly that she had just one sibling. Secondly, even if his father was Thiri Zeya Thura the Elder, his mother may not have been Shin Myat Hla since chronicles never explicitly say that Thihapate was Thado's nephew. They (Yazawin Thit Vol. 2 2012: 275) (Hmannan Vol. 2 2003: 64) do so with another royal, stating that Thiri Zeya Thura the Younger was Thado's nephew.) The first mention of him in the chronicles comes at the coronation ceremony of King Mohnyin Thado on 20 May 1426. The new king, who had just seized the Ava throne, wedded his eldest daughter Shin Hla Myat to a nephew of his chief queen consort. The king also gave his new son-in-law the title of Thihapate, and the district of Pyinzi, a small district 60km south of the capital Ava (Inwa), in fief.

== Career ==
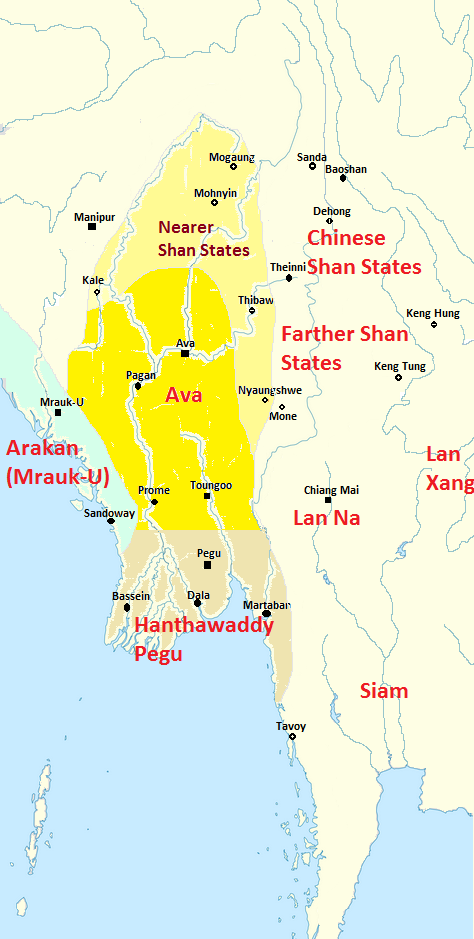
Political map of Myanmar c. 1450. The map in the first half of the century was similar except in Arakan which was disorganized until 1429. The nearer Shan states in light yellow, including Mohnyin, Mogaung, Thibaw (Hsipaw/Onbaung) and Nyaungshwe (Yawnghwe), were sometime tributaries of Ava during the first half of the 15th century.

Thihapate served as a loyal vassal of three kings for the next 25 years. He moved to Mohnyin after 1439 until his death in 1450/51.

=== Governorships at Pyinzi and Pakhan ===
Thihapate's years during King Thado's reign (1426–1439) were uneventful. He was part of his father-in-law's tight-knit circle that ruled the rump kingdom in which many former vassals remained in revolt. In 1429, he was appointed by the king to succeed Thiri Zeya Thura the Elder as governor of Pakhan and the surrounding ten districts, and to take over the command of a flotilla of ten war boats. (He would retain the governorship at Pyinzi until 1434.) In 1431, he was tapped by the king to lead one of the two armies that would counter the forces of Hanthawaddy Pegu and Toungoo (Taungoo) laying siege to the southern city of Prome (Pyay); the other army was led by the king himself. However, he did not see any action as Thado decided to accept most of the terms set by King Binnya Ran I of Hanthawaddy. (Note: (Hmannan Vol. 2 2003: 73–74): Thado formally ceded Tharrawaddy and Paungde, and sent Princess Soe Min Wimala Dewi to Ran, in a marriage of state. The only concession by Ran was to withdraw his support of Toungoo.) Chronicles have no mention of Thihapate for the rest of Thado's reign except in early 1434 when his second son was given the title of Thinkhaya by the king.

=== Appointment at Mohnyin ===
Thihapate's career would rise further after King Thado's death in 1439. The rise was not only due to his deep familial ties with the new king—he and King Minye Kyawswa were brothers-in-law, and his second son Thinkhaya was married to the king's only child Min Mya Hnit — but also because of his success in carrying out the new king's more assertive policy. Unlike Thado, Minye Kyawswa was determined to recapture the former vassal states of Ava, and assigned his older brother-in-law to retake the lost northern states. Later in the year, Thihapate marched with a sizable army (9000 men, 500 cavalry, 30 elephants) in an expedition, and was able to gain the submission of Mohnyin and Kale (Kalay) without a fight. The expedition benefited greatly from Mohnyin's overlord Mong Mao being preoccupied with the Chinese attacks, and unable to respond.

This quick success however would keep Thihapate in the north for the rest of his life. He was appointed sawbwa of Mohnyin by the king to be Ava's bulwark in north. His transfer to the north was joined by that of Thiri Zeya Thura the Younger as sawbwa of Kale. He retained his fiefs in Pakhan and the surrounding districts. His wife may have remained in Pakhan as she is also mentioned as the lord of Pakhan (ပခန်းစား) (as opposed to Duchess of Pakhan (ပခန်း မိဖုရား)) in the chronicles.

=== Mogaung campaign and refusal to be king ===
His initial tenure at Mohnyin was largely quiet for about two years. Ava was busy with the southeastern campaign in the 1440–1441 dry season, and Mong Mao, which remained preoccupied with the Chinese threat, did not contest Ava's takeover of Mohnyin and Kale. But when the Chinese resumed their attacks on Mong Mao in 1441, Minye Kyawswa ordered an attack on Mogaung, Mong Mao's rear. Thihapate and Thiri Zeya Thura duly marched to Mogaung, 90 km northeast of Mohnyin. But unlike in 1439, the Ava forces faced stiff resistance as the town was defended by Tho Ngan Bwa himself. The supreme sawbwa (lord) of Mong Mao had fled to Mogaung, and was making his last stand.

It was during the siege that the Ava court came calling for Thihapate. King Minye Kyawswa had suddenly died without leaving a male heir, and although his younger brother Viceroy Thihathu of Prome was next in line of succession, the court had selected Thihapate as the successor. (According to Aung-Thwin, the ministers may have preferred Thihapate because they wished to wield greater power at court, knowing that Thihathu was likely to be a stronger leader than Thihapate.) When a messenger informed him at the front that the court had invited him to be the next king, Thihapate refused, saying that he was neither a son nor a younger brother of the king, and that the court should give the throne to the rightful heir, Thihathu, and went back to overseeing the siege.

The siege ended a few weeks later with the surrender of Tho Ngan Bwa. It was a major achievement for Ava as Tho Ngan Bwa not only was the supreme sawbwa of Mong Mao which consisted of 21 vassal states, but also a most wanted man by the Ming court, which had offered the Luchuan district (present-day Longchuan County, Yunnan, China) as reward. The Ava forces rushed back to Ava (Inwa), arriving on 5 April 1442, on the eve of the coronation ceremony of Thihathu. On 6 April 1442, (Note: (Yazawin Thit Vol. 1 2012: 286): Friday, 12th waning of Kason 804 ME = Friday, 6 April 1442) Thihathu ascended the throne with the regnal title of Narapati. During the ceremony, Thihapate and Thiri Zeya Thura presented Tho Ngan Bwa to the new king and the court. In order to prove his loyalty to the new king, Thihapate also presented his eldest son Min Uti to the king at the ceremony.

=== Defense of the north ===
Ming campaigns in Yunnan–Burma border, 1436–1449

Thihapate dutifully returned to Mohnyin after the coronation. Narapati for his part accepted the pledge of allegiance by his older brother-in-law, and kept him at Mohnyin, the main northern outpost of Ava, as the Chinese attention had turned to Ava. The king however was careful in not giving his brother-in-law too much power. He appointed two Shan princes, Tho Kyein Bwa (Chinese: Si Ji-fa) and Tho Bok Bwa (Chinese: Si Bu-fa), as co-sawbwas of Mogaung. Thihapate successfully formed a close relationship with the two sawbwas of Mogaung in defense of the northern states against Chinese incursions in 1444–1445, and 1449–1450, which began due to Ava's refusal to hand over Tho Ngan Bwa. (Note: The initial casus belli, according to the royal chronicles (Yazawin Thit Vol. 1 2012: 286–287), was Ava's refusal to hand over Tho Ngan Bwa. According to the Ming Shilu (Fernquest 2006: 62), Ava refused to hand over the sawbwa until the Ming court made good on its promised reward of giving the Luchuan district to Ava; when the Ming court demurred, Ava held on to the sawbwa.)

== Death and aftermath ==
About a year or so after the end of Chinese incursions, Thihapate suddenly died — in either 1450 (or early 1451). (Note: All three main chronicles say that Thihapate died in 812 ME (30 March 1450 to 29 March 1451). The chronicle Maha Yazawin (Maha Yazawin Vol. 2 2006: 81) says his eldest son in league with the co-sawbwas of Mogaung revolted in the same year, forcing Ava to send a force to reclaim the states (presumably in the same year since no additional year is mentioned for the campaign). This suggests that Thihapate likely died before or at the beginning of the dry season of 1450–1451. However, (Yazawin Thit Vol. 1 2012: 291) says the expedition took place in 813 ME (30 March 1451 to 29 March 1452), meaning Thihapate could have died later, to early 1451 until 29 March 1451. (Hmannan Vol. 2 2003: 90) follows the Maha Yazawin's narrative. (Aung-Thwin 2017: 95) seems to follow the Maha Yazawin and Hmannan Yazawin chronicles as it says Thihapate died in 1450.) The cause of his death is not mentioned in the chronicles. However, his eldest son Min Uti in league with the co-sawbwas of Mogaung revolted, apparently with Chinese encouragement. (Note: "Uti" was not a common Burmese royal title. Per (Aung-Thwin 2017: 95), Uti is "the usual term for the governor of Yunnan.") Ava responded by sending two large armies (combined strength of 19,000 troops, 800 cavalry, 40 elephants) led by the king and the crown prince themselves. The rebellion was put down in 1451, and Uti was executed. The rest of Thihapate's children all became prominent members of the ruling dynasty. His second son, Thinkhaya, succeeded his title of Thihapate and fief at Pakhan. His third child and eldest daughter Saw Hla Min later became the chief queen consort of King Thihathura of Ava (r. 1468–1480).

== Military service ==
The following is a list of military campaigns he took part as reported in the royal chronicles.

Campaign	Duration	Troops commanded	Notes
Hanthawaddy	1431	8 regiments	Commanded the army (5000 infantry, 800 cavalry, 50 elephants) that marched down to relieve Prome (Pyay)
Mohnyin	1439	9 regiments	Commanded the army (9000 infantry, 500 cavalry, 30 elephants) that marched to Mohnyin
Mogaung	1441–1442	?	Co-commander-in-chief of the army that laid siege to Mogaung and later took the town
Chinese invasion	1444–1445	?	Guarded Bhamo alongside the sawbwa of Mogaung; part of the overall mobilization by Ava against the Chinese threat
Chinese invasion	1449–1450	?	Guarded Mohnyin during a Chinese invasion that aimed to take Mohnyin and Mogaung; but the invasion force was stopped by the co-sawbwas of Mogaung.

== Family ==
Thihapate and his wife Shin Hla Myat were first cousins (if not double first cousins). The couple had had two sons and six daughters.

Issue	Notes
Min Uti of Mohnyin	Rebel sawbwa of Mohnyin (r. 1450/51)
Thihapate II of Pakhan	Governor of Pakhan (r. 1450/51–1507/08) (Note: d. 869 ME (1507/08)); Husband of Min Mya Hnit, Shwe Einthe of Twinthin and Min Myat Htut
Saw Hla Min	Chief queen consort of Ava (r. 1468–1480)
daughter	Duchess of Nyaungyan; second wife of Sithu Kyawhtin of Toungoo
daughter	Duchess of Kanni
daughter	Duchess of Thingyi
daughter	Duchess of Sagu; wife of Thinkhaya of Sagu
daughter	Duchess of Salin; wife of Thiri Zeya Thura of Salin

== Bibliography ==
- Aung-Thwin, Michael A. (2017). Myanmar in the Fifteenth Century. Honolulu: University of Hawai'i Press. ISBN 978-0-8248-6783-6.
- Fernquest, Jon (Autumn 2006). "Crucible of War: Burma and the Ming in the Tai Frontier Zone (1382–1454)" (PDF). SOAS Bulletin of Burma Research. 4 (2).
- Harvey, G. E. (1925). History of Burma: From the Earliest Times to 10 March 1824. London: Frank Cass & Co. Ltd.
- Kala, U (2006) [1724]. Maha Yazawin (in Burmese). Vol. 1–3 (4th printing ed.). Yangon: Ya-Pyei Publishing.
- Maha Sithu (2012) [1798]. Myint Swe; Kyaw Win; Thein Hlaing (eds.). Yazawin Thit (in Burmese). Vol. 1–3 (2nd printing ed.). Yangon: Ya-Pyei Publishing.
- Royal Historical Commission of Burma (2003) [1832]. Hmannan Yazawin (in Burmese). Vol. 1–3. Yangon: Ministry of Information, Myanmar.

Thihapate of Mohnyin Ava Dynasty Born: c. 1410 Died: 1450/51
Royal titles
Preceded by unnamed	Sawbwa of Mohnyin; 1439 – 1450/51	Succeeded by Min Uti
Preceded by Thiri Zeya Thura the Elder	Governor of Pakhan; 1429 – 1450/51	Succeeded by Thihapate II of Pakhan
Preceded by Letya Zeya Thingyan	Governor of Pyinzi; 1426–1434	Succeeded by Thiri Zeya Thura the Younger
