= Dhamma Dewi =

Dhamma Dewi may refer to:

- Atula Maha Dhamma Dewi of Pinya, Chief queen consort of Pinya (r. 1325–1340)
- Ameitta Thiri Maha Dhamma Dewi, Queen consort of Thihathura of Ava (r. 1468–1480)
- Atula Thiri Dhamma Dewi of Ava, Queen consort of Ava (r. 1480–1501)
- Dhamma Dewi of Pakhan, Queen consort of Ava (r. 1502–1527)
- Dhamma Dewi of Toungoo, Queen consort of Burma (r. 1530–1550)
