= Ming–Mong Mao War =

Ming–Mong Mao War may refer to:

- Ming–Mong Mao War (1386–1388)
- Dao Ganmeng rebellion (1397–1398)
- Luchuan–Pingmian campaigns (1436–1449)
