= Si Hangfa =

Ruler of Möng Mao
- Reign: 1399–1413
- Predecessor: Si Lunfa
- Successor: Si Renfa
- Father: Si Lunfa

Si Hangfa (died 1414; Chinese: 思行發; Tai Nüa: ᥔᥫᥴ ᥑᥪᥢᥴ ᥜᥣᥳ), also commonly called Si Xingfa, was the ruler of Möng Mao from 1399 to 1413. He held the Tusi title of Luchuan-Pingmian Pacification Commissioner under the Ming dynasty.

== Name ==
Chinese records such as the History of Ming and Ming Veritable Records refer to him as Si Hangfa (思行發). Due to the character 行 having 2 primary pronunciations, his name is also romanized as Si Xingfa. Tai-Shan records call him Chau Hung Pha (Tai Nüa: ᥔᥫᥴ ᥑᥪᥢᥴ ᥜᥣᥳ).

== Reign ==
Si Hangfa succeeded as the ruler of Möng Mao after his father Si Lunfa died in 1399. Due to the Dao Ganmeng rebellion, the power of Möng Mao had rapidly declined and various local leaders were in rebellion. The Ming court took advantage of the chaos by sponsoring local leaders and partitioning Möng Mao's territory into various smaller Tusi states. By the end of Si Hangfa's reign, Möng Mao’s effective domain had shrunk to the area of present-day Ruili, Mangshi, Longchuan, Longling, and a small portion of territory within present-day Burma.

Si Hangfa hoped to restore order through the support of the Ming dynasty, and sent multiple tribute missions. In 1404, Si Hangfa dispatched his subordinate, Dao Menlai (刀門賴), to the Ming capital to accuse Möng Yang and Hsenwi of encroaching on his territory. The Ministry of Rites deliberated and requested for the Yongle Emperor to punish the envoys of Möng Yang and Hsenwi, who were also then in the capital presenting tribute. The emperor, however, held that conflicts among frontier Tusi were commonplace, that punishing one or two individuals would not solve the problem, and that since the rights and wrongs were still unclear, arbitrarily punishing envoys would only alienate the people. In the end, he merely ordered Mu Ying to send an envoy, Zuo Ji (左緝), to Möng Mao with gifts of ceremonial robes and regalia to placate Si Hangfa. In 1408, a native chief Dao Xuemen (刀薛孟) encroached upon the domain of Dao Famen (刀發孟), a chief under Möng Mao. Mu Sheng reported this to the court, requesting that Si Hangfa be authorized to order Dao Xuemen to return the seized land. The Yongle Emperor agreed, ultimately leaving the matter to Si Hangfa to resolve. In 1412, Möng Mao attacked the Ava kingdom, targeting its northernmost garrison at Myedu. According to the Maha Yazawin, Minye Kyawswa defeated them and took Si Hangfa's wife, children, elephants, horses, and many of his people captive and returned to Ava, prompting Si Hangfa's brothers to seek help from the Ming dynasty to return his wife and children.

Lacking the strength to cope, Si Hangfa abdicated in favour of his brother Si Renfa in 1413. Si Hangfa probably died in 1414.

== Bibliography ==
- Dehong Dai Studies Association [德宏州傣学学会], ed. (2005). 勐卯弄傣族历史研究 [The Historical Study of Möng Mao Lông] (in Chinese). Kunming: Yunnan Nationalities Publishing House. ISBN 7-5367-3158-2.
- Elias, N. (1876). Introductory Sketch of the History of the Shans in Upper Burma and Western Yunnan. Calcutta: Foreign Department Press.
- Fernquest, Jon (Autumn 2006). "Crucible of War: Burma and the Ming in the Tai Frontier Zone (1382–1454)". SOAS Bulletin of Burma Research. 4 (2).
- Liew, Foon Ming (1996). "The Luchuan-Pingmian Campaigns (1436–1449) in the Light of Official Chinese Historiography". Oriens Extremus. 39 (2): 162–203. JSTOR 24047471.
- Wan Kuiyi [万揆一] (1985). "明代麓川之役和《陈言征麓川略》" [The Luchuan-Pingmian Campaigns of the Ming Dynasty and A Concise Memorial on the Luchuan Expedition]. 贵州文史丛刊 [Guizhou Journal of Literature and History] (in Chinese) (2): 69-74. doi:10.14040/j.cnki.52-1004/k.1985.02.011.
- Yang, Shiqi, ed. (1968) [1430]. 明太宗实录 [Taizong Veritable Records] (in Chinese). Taipei: Institute of History and Philology, Academia Sinica.
- Zhang, Tingyu, ed. (1974) [1739]. 明史 [History of Ming] (in Chinese). Beijing: Zhonghua Book Company.

Preceded by Si Lunfa	Ruler of Möng Mao; 1399–1413	Succeeded by Si Renfa
