= Min Uti of Mohnyin =

Min Uti မင်းဥတည်

Sawbwa of Mohnyin
- Reign: 1450/51 – 1451
- Predecessor: Thihapate of Mohnyin
- Successor: Tho Bok Bwa
- Monarch: Narapati I of Ava (1450/51–1451)
- Born: c. 1427 c. 789 ME; Pyinzi; Ava Kingdom
- Died: 1451; 813 ME; Mohnyin; Ava Kingdom
- Father: Thihapate of Mohnyin
- Mother: Shin Hla Myat of Pakhan

Min Uti (Burmese: မင်းဥတည်, pronounced [mɪ́ɰ̃ ʔṵ dí]; c. 1427–1451) was sawbwa of Mohnyin for a few months in 1450–1451. A grandson of King Mohnyin Thado, Uti, apparently with Chinese support, took control of Mohnyin after the sudden death of his father Thihapate of Mohnyin, and revolted against his maternal uncle King Narapati I of Ava. His rebellion was quickly defeated, and he was executed in 1451.

== Brief ==
Min Uti was the eldest child of Gov. Thihapate of Pyinzi and Princess Shin Hla Myat. His personal name and titles are not known. (Min Uti appears to be an epithet, signifying his later allegiance to the Chinese. (Note: "Uti" was not a common Burmese royal title. Per (Aung-Thwin 2017: 95), Uti is "the usual term for the governor of Yunnan.")) He later moved to Mohnyin after his father was transferred to the northern state in 1439. But in 1442, his father sent Uti to the court of the new king Narapati as token of loyalty. He apparently returned to Mohnyin during the Chinese incursions in the 1440s, as he was in Mohnyin at the time of his father's death in 1450/51. He and the co-sawbwas of Mogaung—Tho Kyein Bwa and Tho Bok Bwa—revolted against Ava, apparently with Chinese support.

Their rebellion was short-lived. His uncle King Narapati I of Ava responded forcefully. The king and the Crown Prince came up with two armies (19,000 troops, 800 cavalry, 40 elephants), and put down the rebellion in 1451. Uti and the two other sawbwas were caught. The king summarily ordered the execution of his eldest nephew. The two sawbwas however won a reprieve after pleading that they partook in the rebellion only because Uti had taken the families of the sawbwas hostage. The plea worked. The king appointed Tho Bok Bwa as sawbwa of Mohnyin, and kept Tho Kyein Bwa at Mogaung.

== Bibliography ==
- Aung-Thwin, Michael A. (2017). Myanmar in the Fifteenth Century. Honolulu: University of Hawai'i Press. ISBN 978-0-8248-6783-6.
- Kala, U (2006) [1724]. Maha Yazawin (in Burmese). Vol. 1–3 (4th printing ed.). Yangon: Ya-Pyei Publishing.
- Maha Sithu (2012) [1798]. Myint Swe; Kyaw Win; Thein Hlaing (eds.). Yazawin Thit (in Burmese). Vol. 1–3 (2nd printing ed.). Yangon: Ya-Pyei Publishing.
- Royal Historical Commission of Burma (2003) [1832]. Hmannan Yazawin (in Burmese). Vol. 1–3. Yangon: Ministry of Information, Myanmar.

Min Uti of Mohnyin Ava Dynasty Born: c. 1427 Died: 1451
Royal titles
Preceded by Thihapate of Mohnyin	Sawbwa of Mohnyin; 1450/51 – 1451	Succeeded by Tho Bok Bwa
