= Atula Thiri Dhamma Dewi of Ava =

Atula Thiri Dhamma Dewi အတုလသီရိ ဓမ္မဒေဝီ

Chief queen consort of Ava
- Reign: c. August 1480 – 7 April 1501
- Predecessor: Ameitta Thiri Maha Dhamma Dewi
- Successor: Salin Minthami
- Born: c. 1446/47 c. 808 ME; Twinthin
- Died: Unknown; Ava (Inwa)?
- Spouse: Minkhaung II
- Issue: Thihathura II; Narapati II; Soe Min; Min Hpwa Saw
- Father: Thihapate II of Pakhan
- Mother: Shwe Einthe of Twinthin
- Religion: Theravada Buddhism

Atula Thiri Dhamma Dewi (Burmese: အတုလသီရိ ဓမ္မဒေဝီ, pronounced [ʔətṵla̰ θìɹḭ dəma̰dèwì], Atulasīridhammadevī) was the chief queen consort of King Minkhaung II of Ava. She was a granddaughter of King Mohnyin Thado, as well as a direct descendant of King Swa Saw Ke of Ava from her mother's side. (Note: (Hmannan Vol. 2 2003: 82): Her maternal great grandfather Thinkhaya of Pagan was a half-uncle of King Minkhaung I.)

She was wedded to her cousin Prince Nawrahta (later King Minkhaung II) in 1466/67 by their grandfather King Narapati I of Ava. The couple had been engaged since they were both nine years old (in their 10th year).

== Ancestry ==
The following is her ancestry as reported in the Hmannan Yazawin chronicle. (Note: See (Hmannan Vol. 2 2003: 61, 73, 82–83, 111). According to (Hmannan Vol. 2 2003: 61), Thihapate of Mohnyin was a nephew of Shin Mi Myat.)

Ancestry of Queen Atula Thiri Dhamma Dewi

8. unnamed
4. Thihapate of Mohnyin
9. unnamed
2. Thihapate II of Pakhan
10. (=12) Mohnyin Thado
5. Shin Hla Myat of Pakhan
11. (=13) Shin Myat Hla of Ava
1. Atula Thiri Dhamma Dewi
12. (=10) Mohnyin Thado
6. Narapati I of Ava
13. (=11) Shin Myat Hla of Ava
3. Shwe Einthe of Twinthin
14. Thinkhaya of Pagan
7. Atula Thiri Maha Yaza Dewi of Ava
15. Saw Min Pu

== Bibliography ==
- Kala, U (2006) [1724]. Maha Yazawin (in Burmese). Vol. 1–3 (4th printing ed.). Yangon: Ya-Pyei Publishing.
- Maha Sithu (2012) [1798]. Myint Swe; Kyaw Win; Thein Hlaing (eds.). Yazawin Thit (in Burmese). Vol. 1–3 (2nd printing ed.). Yangon: Ya-Pyei Publishing.
- Royal Historical Commission of Burma (1832). Hmannan Yazawin (in Burmese). Vol. 1–3 (2003 ed.). Yangon: Ministry of Information, Myanmar.

Atula Thiri Dhamma Dewi of Ava Toungoo Dynasty Born: c. 1446/47
Royal titles
Preceded by Ameitta Thiri Maha Dhamma Dewi	Chief queen consort of Ava; 1480–1501	Succeeded by Salin Minthami
