= Luchuan–Pingmian campaigns =

Military conflict

Luchuan-Pingmian campaigns
- Map of the overview of Luchuan-Pingmian campaigns that contains the Ming attack routes in the year of 1441,1444 and 1449 battles that under Wang Ji's command.
Date	1436–1449
Location	Modern-day Burma and Yunnan, China
Result	Ming victory

Belligerents
Ming dynasty	Möng Mao

Commanders and leaders
Wang Ji; Fang Zheng	Si Renfa; Si Jifa

Strength
295,000	150,000+

Casualties and losses
Unknown	55,000+

The Luchuan–Pingmian campaigns (Chinese: 麓川之役; pinyin: Lùchuān Zhī Yì) (1436–49) were punitive expeditions carried out by the Ming dynasty under the rule of the Emperor Yingzong against the Shan-led State of Möng Mao near the frontier with the Kingdom of Ava.

Möng Mao, called Luchuan–Pingmian by the Ming, was a Chinese military and civilian pacification commission (a tusi) on the Sino–Burmese border, corresponding roughly to the modern districts of Longchuan and Ruili, including part of the Gaoligong Mountains, along the upper reaches of the Shweli River.

== Background ==
A year after the Dao Ganmeng rebellion of 1398, the tusi Si Lunfa died and a new generation of elites rose to power in Möng Mao. His son Si Hangfa, together with Dao Hun and Dao Cuan, conducted short lived raids on Ming territory before military retaliation by the Yunnan guard put a stop to that. The territory of Möng Mao was partitioned into five new administrative divisions each with their own tusi. Thereafter Si Hangfa paid regular annual tribute to the Ming until he was removed from office in 1413 for failing to observe proper tribute ceremonies, and offended an imperial envoy. His brother Si Renfa succeeded him.

In the following 20 years from 1413 to 1433 Möng Mao, Hsenwi, and the Kingdom of Ava regularly lodged complaints of incursions by neighboring states to the Ming dynasty. However no action was taken except to send imperial envoys to persuade them to cease encroachment on foreign territories.

In March 1436, Si Renfa petitioned for an exemption of 2,500 taels in taxes, which was the amount Möng Mao was in arrears. The Emperor Yingzong of Ming granted the petition approval despite objections from his officials.

Under Si Renfa, Möng Mao began a period of expansion into neighbouring regions to reassert control over previously owned territory. In November 1437, Si Renfa attacked the tusi of Nandian and annexed his land. A petition was sent to the Ming court requesting assistance in returning land that had been taken from it by Möng Mao. The regional commander of Yunnan, Mu Sheng, was requested to make an investigation into the matter. His report arrived on 28 June 1438, stating that Möng Mao had "repeatedly invaded Nandian, Ganyai, Tengchong,...Lujiang, and Jinchi". Another report arrived on 14 July, 1438, stating that the Mong Mao ruler had "appointed local chieftains of the neighboring regions subordinate to him without asking for the approval of the Ming court and that some of these men joined forces with him to invade Jinchi."

In preparation for a punitive expedition, the Ming court issued an imperial edict to Hsenwi asking for their assistance in surrounding Möng Mao.

The strategy of divide and conquer had failed on the Ming–Burma frontier. Rather than making the Tai and Shan peoples easier to manage, it had balkanized the region and contributed to the endemic chaos and warfare that plagued the various tusis the Ming had created. In 1438 a total of 199 tusi offices were abolished and the regional commander of Yunnan, Mu Sheng, received orders to carry out a punitive campaign on 8 December, 1438.

== First campaign (1438–1439) ==
The first punitive expedition was led by Fang Zheng, Zhang Rong, Mu Sheng, and Mu Ang.

Mu Sheng, Mu Ang, and Fang Zheng reached the garrison town of Jinchi, located east of the Salween River on 8 December 1438. There they encountered Si Renfa's defenses on the opposite side of the river, where palisades had already been erected. Mu Sheng attempted to negotiate Si Renfa's surrender and sent the commander Che Lin to reach a compromise. Si Renfa agreed to the terms, however his general Mianjian attempted to challenge the Ming troops. Seeing that Mu Sheng had no intention to fight, the exasperated Fang Zheng took his troops as well as his son Fang Ying across the river at night and defeated the enemy, forcing them to retreat. Si Renfa retreated to Jinghan stockade while his forces fled as far as the Gaoligong Mountains.

On 17 January 1439, Fang Zheng attacked Si Renfa's stockade and forced him to retreat further south, after which he continued in pursuit. However by this time his troops were exhausted and his supply lines were cut off. He requested reinforcements, but Mu Sheng only sent a small number as he was angry that Fang Zheng had disobeyed orders. Fang Zheng was then defeated at Kongni where he had pursued Si Renfa, and "fell into an ambush of the elephant phalanx of his enemy", at which point he ordered his son to escape, and died with his troops.

Upon receiving news of Fang Zheng's defeat, Mu Sheng dismantled his camps and retreated to Baoshan as late spring was approaching and along with it the hot summer. When Mu Sheng reached Chuxiong City, he was reprimanded by an imperial envoy for Fang Zheng's failure. Fearing that the emperor would blame him for the loss at Kongni, Mu Sheng sent back 45,000 troops, but died soon after from an illness on 2 May 1439. Emboldened by the Ming failure to suppress him, Si Renfa continued his military expansion against his neighbors.

== Second campaign (1441–1442) ==
In December 1440 Mu Ang petitioned for a second campaign involving a combined army of at least 120,000 men from Huguang, Sichuan, and Guizhou. The Vice Minister of Justice, He Wenyuan, was against a second campaign and petitioned the court on 7 February 1441, in an attempt to persuade them not to squander their resources in capturing land that is "not inhabitable to us." The war party, led by the Minister of War, Wang Ji, and the Duke of Yingguo, Zhang Fu, argued that to let Si Renfa do as he pleased would show weakness to the neighboring Hsenwi and Ava, and would result in a loss of prestige and encourage further rebellions. The second campaign was authorized by the young Zhengtong Emperor under the influence of the palace eunuch Wang Zhen.

The second expedition was led by Jiang Gui, Li An, Liu Ju, and Wang Ji. Before the expedition was carried out, Liu Qiu, a member of the Hanlin Academy, as well as an imperial tutor, presented a memorial in opposition of the campaign. Liu Qiu argued that the southern rebels had already retreated into hiding in the southernmost zone of Yunnan, and did not warrant such a large expenditure as mobilizing 150,000 men. Wang Zhen had him arrested and executed by dismemberment. The second Ming campaign to the Yunnan frontier was officially launched on 27 February 1441.

In June 1441, a Ming contingent of 8,000 engaged with a small Mong Mao party and defeated them in battle, inflicting 150 casualties.

In September 1441, the Ming army met with a Mong Mao force of 30,000 and 80 elephants. The Mong Mao advance was repelled, suffering 352 casualties.

In November 1441, a Ming army of 20,000 was ambushed by Si Renfa. However the ambush was unsuccessful and Si Renfa was forced to retreat with 1,000 casualties. The Ming army pursued the defeated Shan forces to their stronghold in Shangjiang and besieged them. When the Ming set fire to their stockades, Si Renfa's forces attempted to escape through a watergate, but were attacked by the Ming, and suffered heavy casualties. Although Si Renfa managed to escape, his side reportedly suffered 50,000 casualties in total.

In December 1441, a Ming contingent of 8,000 engaged in battle with an armed Mong Mao force of 20,000 and defeated them.

In January 1442, the Ming army finally attacked Si Renfa's base and captured it. The defending garrison was said to have suffered 2,390 casualties.

Si Renfa fled to Ava where he was arrested by the king and held for ransom in return for Ming land, however the Ming were reluctant to deal with Ava.

== Third campaign (1443–1444) ==
Si Renfa's son Si Jifa escaped and continued independent action in another corner of southwest Yunnan. He sent his younger brother Zhaosai to seek pardon from Ming while at the same time he attacked Ming troops in early 1443. However they were defeated and he was forced to flee to Mong Yang. Zhaosai was kept as a hostage and the Ming retreated from Mong Mao. Seeing that Mong Mao was no longer occupied, Si Jifa returned to his father's base of power and began attacking neighboring tribes once again.

The third punitive expedition was led by Wang Ji and launched in March 1443. Although the mission was to capture Si Jifa, negotiations on the return of Si Renfa had fallen apart. Ava demanded Ming territory for itself and Hsenwi in return for Si Renfa. Furthermore Ava had made peace with Si Jifa. Therefore, although the Ming army quickly defeated Si Jifa's base of power and captured his family, Si Jifa managed to escape to Mong Yang, and the Ming army decided not to pursue out of consideration of a combined Ava-Hsenwi attack on Ming forces.

A compromise was finally reached between Ava and Ming in April 1445. Ava agreed to hand over Si Renfa in return for Ming support in annexing part of Hsenwi's territory. Si Renfa came into Ming custody in August 1445 and was executed in January 1446.

== Fourth campaign (1449) ==
Since 1444, Si Jifa had repeatedly sent tribute to Ming asking for a pardon, but to no avail.

In March 1449, a combined army of 130,000 soldiers was amassed, and the fourth and final campaign to extirpate the Mong Mao threat was launched under the supervision of Wang Ji.

The army quickly marched on Mong Yang, which harbored Si Jifa, and captured their strongholds.

The bandit son had also built a large stockade on top of Mount Gui-ku, while on the two ridges there were another two stockades. Supporting the three stockades, were a further seven smaller stockades behind and in all, they extended for 100 li. Each stockade had two rows of palisades and there were great logs and stones fastened to the top of the palisades. We divided the troops and attacked in a pincer move. First we attacked the stockade to the left. The logs and stones sounded like thunder and the cannon projectiles and arrows fell like rain. Then suddenly, the Southern wind blew strongly and we hurriedly collected firewood and set it alight. The flames leapt to Heaven and the commanders and troops attacked with great vigour. The man [barbarian] bandits screamed and fled for their lives. In one moment, all the stockades were breached.

— Ming Shilu 12 March 1449

However Si Jifa managed to escape yet again, and the campaign ended inconclusively with the ruling Shan elite allowed to remain in Mong Yang so long as they never returned to Mong Mao. Sources disagree as to how Si Jifa met his end. One source claims he died in combat in 1449, another says he was captured by the king of Ava and held captive in exchange for Ming territory, and one Shan chronicle claims he reigned for another fifty years. While Mong Mao had been defeated and pacified, Si Jifa's son Si Hongfa continued to rule in Mong Yang and his successors would eventually go on to invade Ava in 1527. So in practice Si Lunfa's family survived as rulers in the neighboring state of Mong Yang under the close observation of Ming.

After the end of the fourth Luchuan-Pingmian Campaign in 1454, regular Tai raids once again became a threat to the Burmese heartland. The Chinese allowed remnants of the defeated Tai ruling elite to remain in Mong Yang if they agreed never to cross the Irrawaddy river to the east. This pushed Mong Mao westwards, closer to Ava. These raids would eventually gain momentum and in 1524-27 there would be a fullscale invasion of Ava that brought the Burmese dynasty of rulers that had ruled Ava since 1364 to an end.

— Jon Fernquest

The fourth campaign was also marred by lack of discipline, inefficient administration, and mismanagement of resources. On the first day of mobilization, the entire 150,000 strong army started marching all at once, and many were trampled to death. Food supplies were mismanaged and assigned to individual carriers disproportionate to their weight, and no proper plan for their distribution existed. Some soldiers committed suicide due to the conditions prevalent in the army.

== Consequences of the wars ==
As the historian Wang Gongwu observes:

This war had disastrous consequences for the Ming state, it disrupted the economies of all the southwestern provinces involved in sending men and supplies in fighting a war of attrition against a small tribal state and it cost the Ming state the respect of its tribal allies on the border, who saw how inept and wasteful the Ming armies were. Moreover, the war drew commanders, officers, men, and other resources from the north which might have been vital to the defence of the northern borders. It is significant that the end of the Lu-ch'uan campaigns early in 1449 was followed immediately by extensive tribal uprisings and other revolts in five provinces south of the Yangtze river, and, on the northern frontiers, by the spectacular defeats later in the year which virtually destroyed the imperial armies in the north and led to the capture of the emperor himself by the Mongols. The year 1449 was a turningpoint in the history of the dynasty.

The four southern punitive expeditions and the capture of the Zhengtong Emperor during the following Tumu Crisis are considered the turning point into decline for the Ming dynasty.

== Bibliography ==
- Daniels, Christian (2003) "Consolidation and Restructure; Tai Polities and Agricultural Technology in Northern Continental Southeast Asia during the 15th Century," Workshop on Southeast Asia in the 15th Century: The Ming Factor, 18–19 July 2003, Singapore.
- Dardess, John (2012). Ming China 1368–1644 A Concise History of A Resilient Empire. Rowman & Littlefield Publishers, Inc.
- Fernquest, Jon (Autumn 2005). "Min-gyi-nyo, the Shan Invasions of Ava (1524–27), and the Beginnings of Expansionary Warfare in Toungoo Burma: 1486–1539". SOAS Bulletin of Burma Research. 3 (2): 35–142.
- Fernquest, Jon (Autumn 2006). "Crucible of War: Burma and the Ming in the Tai Frontier Zone (1382–1454)". SOAS Bulletin of Burma Research. 4 (2).
- Liew, Foon Ming (1996). "The Luchuan-Pingmian Campaigns (1436–1449) in the Light of Official Chinese Historiography". Oriens Extremus. 39 (2): 162–203. JSTOR 24047471.
- Saimong Mangrai, Sao (1969). The Shan States and the British Annexation (2nd ed.). New York: Cornell University.
- Sun, Laichen (2000). Ming-Southeast Asian overland interactions, c. 1368–1644 (Unpublished PhD dissertation). University of Michigan.
- Wang, Gungwu (1998). "Ming Foreign Relations: Southeast Asia". The Cambridge History of China. Vol. 8, "The Ming Dynasty, 1368–1644, " pt. 2. Cambridge University Press. pp. 301–332.
