= Cuanman =

Former ethnic group in Yunnan, China

Cuanman (Chinese: 爨蠻) was an ethnic group in northern Yunnan, China. They came into power after assisting Zhuge Liang's Southern Campaign and dominated Yunnan during the Northern and Southern dynasties period. They were defeated by the Sui dynasty in 602 and split into the Baiman and Wuman, allegedly the ancestors of modern-day Bai people and Yi people.

== History ==
According to the tomb tablet of Cuan Longyan, they were descended from a famous official in Shanxi, however it was common at the time to create fictitious lineages linking indigenous elites back to China, and it's also highly likely that the Cuans were originally native to Yunnan.

In the 320s, during the Eastern Jin Dynasty, the Cuan clan migrated into Yunnan. In 339, Cuan Chen ((爨琛) established garrisons in Nanzhong (present-day Yunnan and western Guizhou), named himself king and held authority from Lake Dian, then known as Kunchuan (昆川), forming a local and semi-independent regime alongside the Xie（謝) clan, a chieftain from the Zangke (牂柯) region in present-day Guizhou.

In 549, a native from Ningzhou rose to power. The Northern Zhou dynasty granted him the title of prefectural governor (刺史) of Southern Ningzhou (南寧州). In contemporary Chinese historical records, the polity was called "Xicuan guo" (Western Cuan State). The Cuan sent tribute to Northern Zhou and the Sui dynasty. However Cuan power was broken in 597 and 602 when the Sui invaded. Cuan surrendered to the Sui and was executed but the Sui did not set up direct rule over the region. After Cuan Zan died, the Cuan were split between two rulers, Cuan Wan and Cuan Zhen. The son of Cuan Wan was later sent home by Emperor Taizong of Tang and made the prefect of Kunzhou (Kunzhou) The Cuan were divided in half between the east, known as the Wuman/Black Mywa (烏蠻), and the west, known as the Baiman/White Mywa (白蠻). In 737, Piluoge of the Wuman tribe, Mengshe, united the Wuman tribes and founded Nanzhao (南詔).

According to pre-Tang historical sources, the Cuan kingdom consisted of two parts, Western Cuan and Eastern Cuan. The territory of Western Cuan encompassed much of contemporary central and eastern Yunnan and was administered directly by the Cuan patrician from their administrative headquarters in Ningzhou and Jianling. The economic and commercial wealth of the Cuan kingdom was centered in Western Cuan, especially in the region of Lake Dian, and the lucrative trade links with polities further south and west originated and ended there. In Chinese texts the people of Western Cuan were called either "Cuan people" (Cuan ren) or "white barbarians" (baiman), and they were considered more sophisticated, more refined, and more civilized than the peoples of Eastern Cuan. The eastern half of the Cuan kingdom comprised present-day north east Yunnan and much of contemporary Guizhou Province. The area was dominated by a mixture of agriculturalists who controlled the fertile lowlands of western Guizhou and eastern Yunnan (the former Yelang and Luowo kingdoms) and of powerful patricians who raised horses and sheep in the remote highlands of northeast Yunnan and northwest Guizhou (the former Bi kingdom). The peoples of Eastern Cuan accepted Western Cuan suzerainty and presented tribute to the Cuan court in Ningzhou, but they were said to govern their respective areas without direct Cuan interference. Apparently the Cuan did not apanage their family members in eastern Cuan territories, nor did they appoint officials to posts in that area. Instead, they relied on a network of personal relations between the patriarchs of the various branches of the Cuan patrician and the Eastern Cuan indigenous elite to extend their influence over this territory. In Chinese texts the peoples in Eastern Cuan are referred to as "black barbarians" (wuman), and they were considered less sophisticated than their Western Cuan counterparts.

— John Herman

In 618, the Tang dynasty assigned Duan Lun as Commander-in-Chief (zongguan) to Yizhou (Chengdu). Cuan Hongda, Wan's son, was assigned to Kunzhou as prefect. Duan sent his subordinate, Yu Dashi, into Hongda's territory to persuade local tribes to give their allegiance to the Tang. Western Cuan was the first to pledge allegiance. In 621, a Tang official, Ji Hongwei, arrived in Nanning (Qujing) and won over more tribes. Some 30 jimi prefectures were created. However exorbitant taxation of the local population caused them to rebel. Duan sentenced them all to death. He was removed from power and transferred back to the capital. After Hongda died, the local chieftains requested the prefectures return to hereditary rule.

== Rulers ==
- Cuan Xi 231
- Cuan Gu 265
- Cuan Liang 327-330
- Cuan Chen 330-340
- Cuan Wei 345
- Cuan Baozi 405
- Cuan Longyan 445
- Cuan Yun 514
- Cuan Zan 548

=== Baiman (White Mywa) ===
- Cuan Wan
- Cuan Hongda
- Cuan Guiwang
- Acha (Cuanman) (Guiwang's wife; as female regent for her son Cuan Shouyu)
- Cuan Shouyu

=== Wuman (Black Mywa) ===
- Cuan Zhen
- Cuan Qianfu
- Cuan Sishao
- Cuan Rijin
- Cuan Chongdao
- Cuan Fuchao
- Acha (Cuanman) (as female monarch)

== Bibliography ==
- Herman, John (2009), The Kingdoms of Nanzhong China's Southwest Border Region Prior to the Eighth Century
- Wang, Zhenping (2013). Tang China in Multi-Polar Asia: A History of Diplomacy and War. University of Hawaii Press.
- Yang, Bin (2008a). "Chapter 3: Military Campaigns against Yunnan: A Cross-Regional Analysis". Between Winds and Clouds: The Making of Yunnan (Second Century BCE to Twentieth Century CE). Columbia University Press.
- Yang, Bin (2008b). "Chapter 4: Rule Based on Native Customs". Between Winds and Clouds: The Making of Yunnan (Second Century BCE to Twentieth Century CE). Columbia University Press.
