= Shin Hla Myat of Pakhan =

Shin Hla Myat ရှင်လှမြတ်

Duchess of Pakhan
- Tenure: 1429 – 1450/51
- Predecessor: Shin Myat Hla of Pakhan
- Successor: Min Myat Htut

Duchess of Pyinzi
- Tenure: 1426 – 1434
- Successor: Saw Pyei Chantha
- Born: c. 1414; Mohnyin; Ava Kingdom
- Died: in or after 1466/67; Ava Kingdom
- Spouse: Thihapate of Mohnyin
- Issue among others...: Min Uti of Mohnyin; Thihapate II of Pakhan; Ameitta Thiri Maha Dhamma Dewi of Ava
- House: Mohnyin
- Father: Mohnyin Thado
- Mother: Shin Myat Hla of Ava
- Religion: Theravada Buddhism

Shin Hla Myat (Burmese: ရှင်လှမြတ်, pronounced [ʃɪ̀ɴ l̥a̰ mjaʔ]) was duchess of Pakhan from 1429 to 1450/51. The eldest daughter of King Mohnyin Thado may also have served as the (acting) governor of Pakhan and the surrounding ten regions after her husband Thihapate was transferred to Mohnyin in 1439. (Note: Hla Myat apparently remained in Pakhan. Chronicles do not mention her stay in Mohnyin or referred to her as duchess of Mohnyin. Instead, she is referred to as the lord of Pakhan (ပခန်းစား) (as opposed to duchess of Pakhan (ပခန်း မိဖုရား)) as seen in (Yazawin Thit Vol. 1 2012: 282).) Hla Myat was the mother of Queen Ameitta Thiri Maha Dhamma Dewi of Ava.

== Brief ==
Hla Myat was the third child of Thado and Myat Hla. She was born and grew up in Mohnyin, where her father was sawbwa (lord governor) of the region. In 1426, her father was successful in seizing the Ava throne. On the day of the coronation, Hla Myat was married off to Thihapate.

She and her husband were first cousins (if not double first cousins). The couple had had two sons and six daughters.

Issue	Notes
Min Uti of Mohnyin	Rebel sawbwa of Mohnyin (r. 1450/51)
Thihapate II of Pakhan	Governor of Pakhan (r. 1450/51–1507/08); Husband of Min Mya Hnit, Shwe Einthe of Twinthin and Min Myat Htut
Saw Hla Min	Chief queen consort of Ava (r. 1468–1480)
daughter	Duchess of Nyaungyan; wife of Sithu Kyawhtin of Toungoo
daughter	Duchess of Kanni
daughter	Duchess of Thingyi
daughter	Duchess of Sagu; wife of Thinkhaya of Sagu
daughter	Duchess of Salin; wife of Thiri Zeya Thura of Salin

The duchess was still alive in 1466/67 when she sponsored merit-making donations to the public under five pyatthats west of Ava (Inwa).

== Ancestry ==
Shin Hla Myat was descended from a distant branch of the Pinya and Pagan royal lines from her paternal side, and from the maternal line, a two times great grandchild of King Thihathu of Pinya.

Ancestry of Shin Hla Myat

8. Min Pale of Paukmyaing
4. Saw Diga of Mye-Ne
9. Shwe Einthe of Paukmyaing
2. Mohnyin Thado
10. Saw Mun Nit of Nyaungyan
5. Saw Pale of Nyaungyan
11. unnamed
1. Hla Myat
12. Thray Sithu
6. Thihapate II of Taungdwin
13. unnamed
3. Shin Myat Hla of Ava
14. Thettawshay of Myinsaing
7. Unnamed
15. unnamed

== Bibliography ==
- Kala, U (2006) [1724]. Maha Yazawin (in Burmese). Vol. 1–3 (4th printing ed.). Yangon: Ya-Pyei Publishing.
- Maha Sithu (2012) [1798]. Myint Swe; Kyaw Win; Thein Hlaing (eds.). Yazawin Thit (in Burmese). Vol. 1–3 (2nd printing ed.). Yangon: Ya-Pyei Publishing.
- Royal Historical Commission of Burma (1832). Hmannan Yazawin (in Burmese). Vol. 1–3 (2003 ed.). Yangon: Ministry of Information, Myanmar.
