= He Tengjiao =

Ming dynasty military officer

He Tengjiao (simplified Chinese: 何腾蛟; traditional Chinese: 何騰蛟; 1592–1649), courtesy name Yuncong (Chinese: 雲從), was a military officer of the late Ming dynasty who led rebellions against the Qing dynasty. He was from Liping, Guizhou.

His son was He Wenrui (何文瑞), a Southern Ming politician.

== Biography ==
After obtaining his juren degree in 1621, he served in various posts. In the winter of 1643, he was appointed governor of Hubei and Hunan. When Zhu Yousong was proclaimed emperor in Nanjing, he was made junior vice-president of the Board of War in 1644 and was made governor-general of Hunan, Hubei, Sichuan, Yunnan, Guizhou, and Guangxi in 1645. In early 1645, he was forced to join Zuo Liangyu as he advanced on the Ming court in Nanjing. However, he escaped in Wuchang and fled to Changsha. Two months later Zhu Yujian was proclaimed emperor in Fuzhou and He was appointed president of the Board of War and Grand Secretary of the Dongge (東閣) with the hereditary rank of Earl of Dingxing (定興伯). Meanwhile the remaining forces of Li Zicheng declared their allegiance to He who established the so-called "Thirteen Military Centers" (十三鎮) in Hunan. He requested Zhu to move the court to Ganzhou, Jiangxi, but Zhu was captured in October 1646 in Tingzhou, Fujian, near the Jiangxi border. In November 1646, Zhu Youlang was proclaimed emperor in Zhaoqing, Guangdong and He was made president of the Board of War and Grand Secretary of the Wuyingdian (武英殿). When the Qing advanced to Hunan, the "Thirteen Military Centers" were defeated and He fled to Wugang, Hunan. When Wugang fell to the Qing, He joined Qu Shisi (瞿式耜) to defend Guilin and Guangxi while Zhu Youlang fled to Jingzhou, Hunan. He was raised in rank to Marquis of Dingxing (定興侯) after defeating the Qing at Quanzhou, Guangxi.

The rebellion of Jin Shenghuan (金聲桓) against the Qing in Jiangxi in June 1648 shifted the center of Manchu attack allowing He to recover a number of cities in Hunan. The following year, the Qing attacked the Ming forces in Hunan. On March 3, Xiangtan, Hunan fell and He was captured. When he was captured, he went on a hunger strike for seven days. In the same month, He hanged himself, dying at the age of 58. The Ming court gave him the posthumous title of Prince of Zhongxiang (中湘王) and the posthumous name Wenlie (文烈). In 1776, the Qianlong Emperor canonized him as Zhongcheng (忠誠).

Han general Kong Youde led the Qing army in taking over Hunan. Southern Ming general Liu Chengyin defected and arranged to peacefully surrendered Wugang without a fight or massacre, but Liu's mother helped the Yongli emperor and his court escape by opening a gate for them. Kong Youde went to Wugang to accept the surrender. Han general Kong Youde executed Fu Zuolin (傅作霖) for refusing to defect, after treating him with courtesy and giving him the opportunity to change sides.

He Tengjiao sabotaged the Southern Ming's defenses in Hunan, by clashing against former Shun (Li Zicheng) loyalists who were fighting against the Qing, starting a civil war within Southern Ming ranks.

The Southern Ming launched a massive counterattack in Hunan after He Tengjiao's death, with Southern Ming general Hu Yiqing recapturing Quanzhou in Guangxi and Zhao Yinxuan and Hu Yiqing recapturing Wugang and arresting the Qing general Yang Yingyuan at Wugang, and recapturing Xinning, Chengbu and other counties. Wang Jincai recaptured Jingzhou, causing Qing general Yan Fengyu to drown while retreating and Hu Yiqing recaptured Dong'an, lengshuitang and Yongzhou and Cao Zhijian took Hengyang and Ma Jinzhong took Baoqing. Liu Chengyin's general Chen Youlong had surrendered to the Qing army with Liu, but on the way to chase and kill Emperor Yongli, he suddenly realized his mistake and turned his gun against the Qing. After Chen Youlong turned his gun around, the Qing soldiers did not dare to believe Liu Chengyin, and Liu Chengyin was executed by Han general Hao Yongzhong since the Qing mistakenly believed he was working with Chen Youlang. On August 25, the Qing army peacefully came to Wugang, and the governor Fu Shangrui surrendered. Former Southern Ming military officers like Wang Yuncheng, Liu Chengyong, Dong Ying and other 47 generals, as well as more than 2,000 officials in the city and 68,000 Han cavalry and infantry defected and all joined the Qing. The flags on the city walls changed from Ming to Qing, and the Qing court changed Fengtian Prefecture back to Wugang Prefecture. The Han official He Hengsi became the first prefect of Wugang in the Qing court. The ancient city of Wugang ended its nearly half-year history as the "capital" of the Southern Ming after a peaceful surrender and defection of the entire Han army and official corps in the city.

In three months, the Southern Ming recovered Quanzhou, Yongzhou, Wugang, Jingzhou and other places from the Qing and restored the situation to what it was before October 1648.
