= Ameitta Thiri Maha Dhamma Dewi of Ava =

Ameitta Thiri Maha Dhamma Dewi အမိတ္တ သီရိ မဟာဓမ္မဒေဝီ

Chief queen consort of Ava
- Tenure: 24 July 1468 – August 1480
- Predecessor: Atula Thiri Maha Yaza Dewi
- Successor: Atula Thiri Dhamma Dewi
- Born: 1430s Pakhan
- Died: After 1485; Ava (Inwa)
- Spouse: Thihathura of Ava
- Issue: Minkhaung II; Thado Dhamma Yaza of Salin; Minye Kyawswa of Yamethin; Bodaw Shin Medaw; Bodaw Shin Bwa; Nat Shin Hnamadaw
- House: Mohnyin
- Father: Thihapate of Mohnyin
- Mother: Shin Hla Myat of Pakhan
- Religion: Theravada Buddhism

Ameitta Thiri Maha Dhamma Dewi of Ava (Burmese: အမိတ္တ သီရိ မဟာဓမ္မဒေဝီ, pronounced [ʔəmeiʔta̰ θìɹḭ məhà dəma̰ dèwì]; Pali: Amittasirimahādhammadevī; born Saw Hla Min) was the chief queen consort of King Thihathura I of Ava from 1468 to 1480. The queen was a granddaughter of King Mohnyin Thado. King Alaungpaya, the founder of Konbaung Dynasty, was a ninth generation descendant of the queen through her daughter Bodaw Shin Medaw. She was still alive in 1485; she accompanied her son Minkhaung II to inspect the pagodas damaged by an earthquake.

== Ancestry ==
Ancestry of Queen Ameitta Thiri Maha Dhamma Dewi

8. Thihapate II of Taungdwin
4. Thiri Zeya Thura of Pakhan?
9. daughter of Thettawshay of Myinsaing
2. Thihapate of Mohnyin
10. Saw Diga of Mye-Ne
5. Shin Myat Hla of Pakhan?
11. Saw Pale of Nyaungyan
1. Ameitta Thiri
12. Saw Diga of Mye-Ne
6. Mohnyin Thado
13. Saw Pale of Nyaungyan
3. Shin Hla Myat of Pakhan
14. Thihapate II of Taungdwin
7. Shin Myat Hla of Ava
15. daughter of Thettawshay of Myinsaing

== Family ==
She and Thihathura had six issue.

Issue	Notes
Minkhaung II	King of Ava (r. 1480–1501)
Thado Dhamma Yaza of Salin	Governor of Salin and ten districts (r. 1468–1483/04)
Minye Kyawswa of Yamethin	Governor of Yamethin (r. 1476–1501)
Bodaw Shin Medaw	Duchess of Myedu, wife of Nawrahta II of Myedu
Bodaw Shin Bwa	Duchess of Sagaing
Nat Shin Hnamadaw	Duchess of Pinya (d. 1509/10)

== Bibliography ==
- Letwe Nawrahta and Maha Sithu (c. 1770). Hla Thamein (ed.). Alaungpaya Ayedawbon (in Burmese) (1961 ed.). Ministry of Culture, Union of Burma.
- Maha Sithu (2012) [1798]. Kyaw Win; Thein Hlaing (eds.). Yazawin Thit (in Burmese). Vol. 1–3 (2nd ed.). Yangon: Ya-Pyei Publishing.
- Royal Historical Commission of Burma (1832). Hmannan Yazawin (in Burmese). Vol. 1–3 (2003 ed.). Yangon: Ministry of Information, Myanmar.

Ameitta Thiri Maha Dhamma Dewi of Ava Ava Kingdom Born: 1430s Died: ?
Royal titles
Preceded by Atula Thiri Maha Yaza Dewi	Chief queen consort of Ava; 24 July 1468 – August 1480	Succeeded by Atula Thiri Dhamma Dewi
