= Wang Ji (Ming dynasty politician) =

Ming dynasty politician

Count Jingyuan Wang Ji

Minister of War
- In office 1457
- Monarch: Emperor Yingzong
- Preceded by: Yu Qian
- Succeeded by: Chen Ruyan
- In office 1434–1440
- Monarch: Emperor Yingzong
- Preceded by: Xu Kuo
- Succeeded by: Xu Xi

Minister of War (Southern Capital)
- In office 1507–1452
- Monarch: Jingtai Emperor
- Preceded by: Xu Qi
- Succeeded by: Zhang Feng

Personal details
- Born: 1378
- Died: 1460 (aged 81–82)

Wang Ji (simplified Chinese: 王骥; traditional Chinese: 王驥; pinyin: Wáng Jì; 1378–1460), courtesy name Shangde (尚德), was a Chinese politician of the Ming dynasty.

== See also ==
- Luchuan–Pingmian campaigns
