= History of Ming =

Chinese official history

- Traditional Chinese: 明史
- Simplified Chinese: 明史
Transcriptions
Standard Mandarin
- Hanyu Pinyin: Míng Shǐ
Southern Min
- Hokkien POJ: Bêng-sú
- Tâi-lô: Bîng-sú

The History of Ming is the final official Chinese history included in the Twenty-Four Histories. It consists of 332 volumes and covers the history of the Ming dynasty from 1368 to 1644. It was written by a number of officials commissioned by the court of Qing dynasty, with Zhang Tingyu as the lead editor. The compilation started in the era of the Shunzhi Emperor and was completed in 1739 in the era of the Qianlong Emperor, though most of the volumes were written in the era of the Kangxi Emperor.

The sinologist Endymion Wilkinson writes that the Mingshi, the second longest of the Twenty-Four Histories, after the History of Song, is "generally reckoned to be one of the best of the Histories and one of the easiest to read."

== Background ==
After the Qing dynasty seized control of Beijing and North China, the Censor Zhao Jiding (趙繼鼎) was asked to compile the History of Ming in 1645 (the second year of the Shunzhi Emperor). In May 1645, the court of Qing dynasty established the committee consisted of the Grand Secretary Feng Quan, Li Jiantai, Fan Wencheng, Gang Lin, and Qi Chongge as the presidents to operate the compilation of the History of Ming. In the same year, the presidents nominated the vice presidents and compilers, and also nominated seven Zhang Guans, ten transcribers of Manchu language, and thirty-six transcribers of Chinese language to lift the curtain on compiling the History of Ming.

The Qing deliberately excluded references and information that showed the Jurchens (Manchus) as subservient to the Ming dynasty from the History to hide their former subservient relationship. The Ming Veritable Records were not used to source content on Jurchens during Ming rule in the History of Ming because of this.

== Process ==
=== Stage 1 ===
The official compiling of History of Ming started on May 2, 1645. At that time, which is the early years that the Qing first entered and hosted the Central Plain. With the obvious purpose of compiling the History of Ming, the Qing dynasty intended to declare the collapse of Ming, however, the court of Hongguang (founded by the Ming imperial clan) with capital of Nanjing was antagonistic to the Qing, and the compiling of History of Ming was the announcement of inexistence of Hongguang Court. On May 15, the Army of Qing broke through Nanjing, and the Hongguang regime was destroyed. Zhu Yujian, the clan relative of Ming founded a new court called Longwu at Fuzhou. Meanwhile, Li Zicheng, the leader of the peasant uprising army jointed with the Ming's governor He Tengjiao, and fought against the court of Qing. It was impossible to assign a large staff to compile the History of Ming in the unstable political and military situation. The turbulent situation lasted until the 22nd year of Qing's Kangxi Emperor, the Kangxi Emperor conquered all opposing states and unified Mainland China and Taiwan. In the stage 1, the court of Qing was busy on the conquest, so the compiling process basically had no progress.

=== Stage 2 ===
After the Revolt of the Three Feudatories had calmed down, the court of Qing was able to concentrate manpower to compile the History of Ming formally. Thirty-five years passed since the court of Qing officially announced the compilation of the History of Ming. In the 17th year of Kangxi Emperor, Qing started drafting learned scholars from all of the country, and stage 2 of compiling got into its stride. In the 4th year of Qianlong Emperor (1739), the History of Ming was completed compiling of all it sections. It was the third time that the court of Qing organized staff to modify the manuscript of the History of Ming, and finalized its compiling.

One of the main sources for the History of Ming was Ming Veritable Records, i.e. the records of individual emperors' reigns, each of which was compiled soon after the respective emperor's death, based on the daily records accumulated during the reign.

== Contents ==
The History of Ming follows a similar structure to previous standard histories:

- Annals (本紀) – volumes 1–24
- Treatises (志) – volumes 25–99
- Tables (表) – volumes 100–112
- Biographies (列傳) – volumes 113–332

Volumes 320–328 cover foreign states (外國). In contrast with previous histories many terms used exactly or closely match modern place names, including Korea (朝鮮) in volume 320, Vietnam (Annam – 安南) in volume 321, Japan (日本) in volume 322, the island of Luzon (呂宋) in the present-day Philippines in volume 323, Borneo (婆羅) in volume 323, Java (爪哇) in volume 324, Malacca (滿刺加) in volume 325, Sumatra (蘇門答喇) in volume 325, Johor (柔佛) in present-day Malaysia in volume 325,

== See also ==
- History of the Ming dynasty
- Ming Veritable Records
