= Edward Harper Parker =

Edward Harper Parker (3 July 1849 – 1926) was an English barrister and sinologist who wrote a number of books on the First and Second Opium Wars and other Chinese topics. On his return to England he ended his career as a university professor.

== Biography ==
He was educated at the Royal Institution School, Liverpool, and became a barrister of the Middle Temple. He intended to engage in the tea trade, studied Chinese, and from 1869 to 1871, in the character of student interpreter, he traveled in Mongolia, and afterwards served at the British consulates in Wenzhou, Fuzan, and Shanghai, and traveled in Oceania, Eastern Asia, and North America. He retired from the consular service in 1895, became reader in Chinese at University College, Liverpool, in 1896, and in 1901 was appointed to a chair in Chinese at Owens College, Manchester. This chair was part-time and he held it until his death.

== Intellectual contributions ==
In his day, he was well known as a popular interpreter of current and historical events. But his greatest contribution historically may turn out to be an unusual outlook on colloquial Chinese language. He identified, most significantly, "characterless words" in Cantonese and Hakka, among other dialect groups. Chinese historical linguistics, as practiced both natively and among Westerners, did not begin taking these words seriously until almost the present day.

== Works ==
- Comparative Chinese Family Law (1879)
- Chinese Account of the Opium War (1888)
- China's Relations with Foreigners (1888)
- Up the Yangtsze (1892)
- Burma (1893)
- A Thousand Years of the Tartars (1895)
- The life, labours and doctrines of Confucius (1897)
- China (1901)
- John Chinaman (1901)
- China, Past and Present (1903)
- China and Religion (1905)
- Ancient China Simplified (1908)
- Studies in Chinese Religion (1910)
- China, her history, diplomacy, and commerce: from the earliest times to the present day (1917)
