= Ney Elias =

English explorer, geographer and diplomat

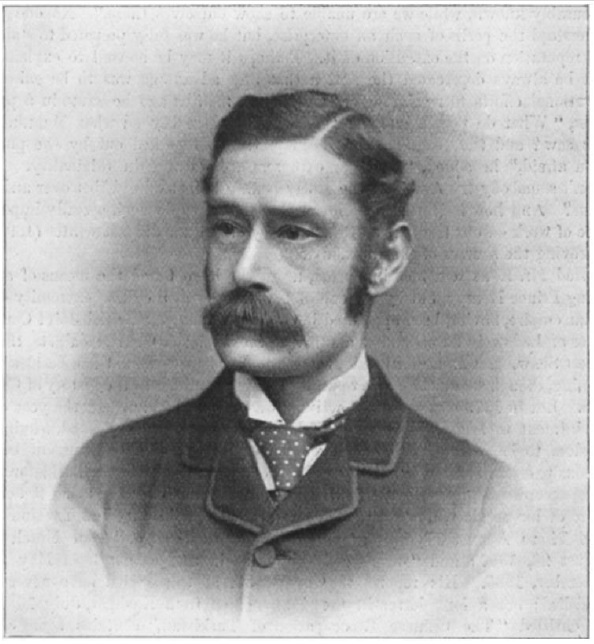
- Born: 10 February 1844; Widmore, Bromley, Kent, England
- Died: 31 May 1897 (aged 53); Mayfair, London, England
- Occupations: Explorer, diplomat

Ney Elias, CIE, (10 February 1844 – 31 May 1897) was an English explorer, geographer, and diplomat, most known for his extensive travels in Asia. Modern scholars speculate that he was a key intelligence agent for Britain during the Great Game. Elias travelled extensively in the Karakoram, Hindu Kush, Pamirs, and Turkestan regions of High Asia.

== Life ==
=== Education ===
He was born in Widmore, Bromley, Kent on 10 February 1844, was the second son of Ney Elias (died 1891) of Kensington. Educated in London, Paris, and Dresden, he became in 1865 a fellow of the Royal Geographical Society and studied geography and surveying under the society's instructors.

=== Travels ===
In 1866, he went to Shanghai in the employment of a mercantile house; and in 1868 volunteered to lead an expedition and examine the old and new courses of the Hoang-ho. His account of this journey was published in the Royal Geographical Society's Journal in a paper which gave, Sir Roderick Murchison said, for the first time accurate information about the diversion of the Yellow River.

In July 1872, accompanied by one Chinese servant, Elias started on a journey across the Gobi Desert, travelling nearly 2,500 miles from the great wall to the Russian frontier, and thence another 2,300 miles to Nizhny Novgorod. The geographical results of the journey were summed up by Elias in a paper for the Royal Geographical Society. It was accomplished at a time when the Chinese provinces traversed were overrun by the Tungani rebels. For many weeks Elias travelled in constant apprehension of attack; he had scarcely any sleep; and when he reached the Siberian frontier, the Russian officers stared at him as if he had dropped from the sky. By no means a robust man, his indomitable will and silent courage carried him through all the perils of the way; while the accuracy of his observation and the scientific value of his record earned the highest approval of authorities like Sir Henry Rawlinson and Sir Henry Yule. Elias received the Founder's Medal of the Royal Geographical Society (26 May 1873), and on the recommendations of Rawlinson and Sir Bartle Frere, his services were retained by the government of India.

Nominated an extra attaché to the Calcutta foreign office on 20 March 1874, Elias was appointed in September 1874 assistant to the resident at Mandalay; and shortly afterwards second in command of the overland mission to China, which turned back, owing to the murder of Augustus Raymond Margary. In 1876, Elias drew up a project for an expedition to Tibet; but, owing to misunderstandings, the scheme fell through. In 1877, he was attached to Robert B. Shaw's mission to Kashgar, and went in advance to Leh, where, on the death of Yakub Beg, ruler of Eastern Turkestan, the mission was abandoned. Elias remained as the British Joint Commissioner (trade officer) in Ladakh. In 1879, he started, on his own initiative, to inspect the road over the Karakorum, and, on nearing the frontier, sent a friendly message to the Chinese Amban of Yarkund, who invited him to come on. Accompanied by Captain Bridges, an ex-dragoon officer, and without waiting for the Indian foreign office to forbid the enterprise, he proceeded to Yarkund, where the Amban, though educated at the Pekin Jesuit college, pretended never to have heard either of England or India, and the insolent attentions of some Hunan braves nearly led to a collision. The visit, however, ended without serious misadventure, and the Indian government gave its sanction to this and subsequent journeys into Chinese Turkestan. Elias was thus gazetted as 'on special duty' at Yarkund from 14 June to 17 August 1879, 'on deputation to Kashgar' from 8 March to 26 August 1880, and 'on special duty at Kashgar from 26 May to September 1885,' having in the meantime taken furlough to England. In a letter to the Times, dated Kashgar, 10 July 1880, he gave an account of the reconquest of Eastern Turkestan by the Chinese.

In September 1885, under orders from the Indian government, Elias left Yarkund for the Pamirs and Upper Oxus, and, in the course of an arduous journey, he made a route survey of six hundred miles from the Chinese frontier to Ishkashim, determined points and altitudes on the Pamirs, and visited the confluence of the Murghab and Panja rivers, solving the problem as to which was the upper course of the Oxus. Afterwards, crossing Badakhshan and Balkh, he joined the Afghan boundary commission near Herat, and thence returned to India by way of Balkh and Chitral, having traversed Northern Afghanistan without an escort, under a safe-conduct from Abdur Rahman Khan. In January 1888, he was made a C.I.E., but never accepted the distinction.

From November 1888 to February 1889, he was on special duty in connection with the Sikkim Expedition, and in October 1889 took command of a mission to report on the political geography and condition of the Shan States on the Indo-Siamese frontier. Francis Younghusband states that in the spring of 1889 Elias advised him at the outset of his second major expedition through Hunza territory to the Yarkand River.

On 14 December 1891 he was appointed agent to the governor-general at Meshed, and consul-general for Khorasan and Seistan.

While on furlough in 1895, in collaboration with Mr. E. D. Ross, he brought out an English version of the Tarikh-i-Rashidi, by Mirza Haidar of Kashgar, cousin to the Emperor Baber, revising the translation and supplying an introduction and notes embodying much of his wide knowledge of the history and geography of Central Asia.

=== Retirement and death ===
In November 1896, he retired from the service. On 31 May 1897, he died suddenly at his rooms in North Audley Street, London, from the effects of blood poisoning. He was unmarried. Elias' grave lies in Balls Pond Road Cemetery in Canonbury, London.

== Works ==
Elias's writings are for the most part only accessible in the secret archives of the Indian government, but they also include the following :

- "The New Bed of the Yellow River" (Journal of the N. China Branch of the R. A. S. 1869).
- "Notes of a Journey to the New Course of the Yellow River in 1868" (R.G.S. Journal, 1870, xl. 1).
- "A Journey though Western Mongolia" (R. G. S. Journal, 1873, xliii. 108).
- "Visit to the Valley of the Shueli in Western Yunnan" (R. G. S. Journal, xlvi. 198).
- Introductory Sketch of the History of the Shans in Upper Burma and Western Yunnan, Calcutta, 1876.
- The Tarikh-i-Rashidi of Mirza Muhammad Haidar, Dughlat, English version (by E. D. Ross), edited by N. Elias, London, 1895.
- "An Apocryphal Inscription in Khorassan" (R. A. S. Journal, 1896, p. 767).
- "Notice of an Inscription at Turbat-i-Jam" (R. A. S. Journal, 1897, p. 47).
- The Khojas of E. Turkestan, ed. E. Elias, Asiatic Society of Bengal, 1897, Supplement.
