= Dao Ganmeng rebellion =

Date	December 1397 – January 1398
Location	Luchuan (now Ruili) in southwest Yunnan
Result	Ming victory

Belligerents
Rebel Möng Mao	Ming dynasty

Commanders and leaders
Dao Ganmeng	Mu Chun; He Fu; Qu Neng

Strength
70,000+	5,500

Casualties and losses
?	?

The Dao Ganmeng rebellion (Chinese: 刀干孟之亂) was a military conflict between the Ming dynasty and rebel Möng Mao forces. Dao Ganmeng, called Tao Kang Möng in Shan, rebelled in 1397 and expelled the previous ruler Si Lunfa. Si Lunfa enlisted Ming aid in re-assuming control over his territory.

== Background ==
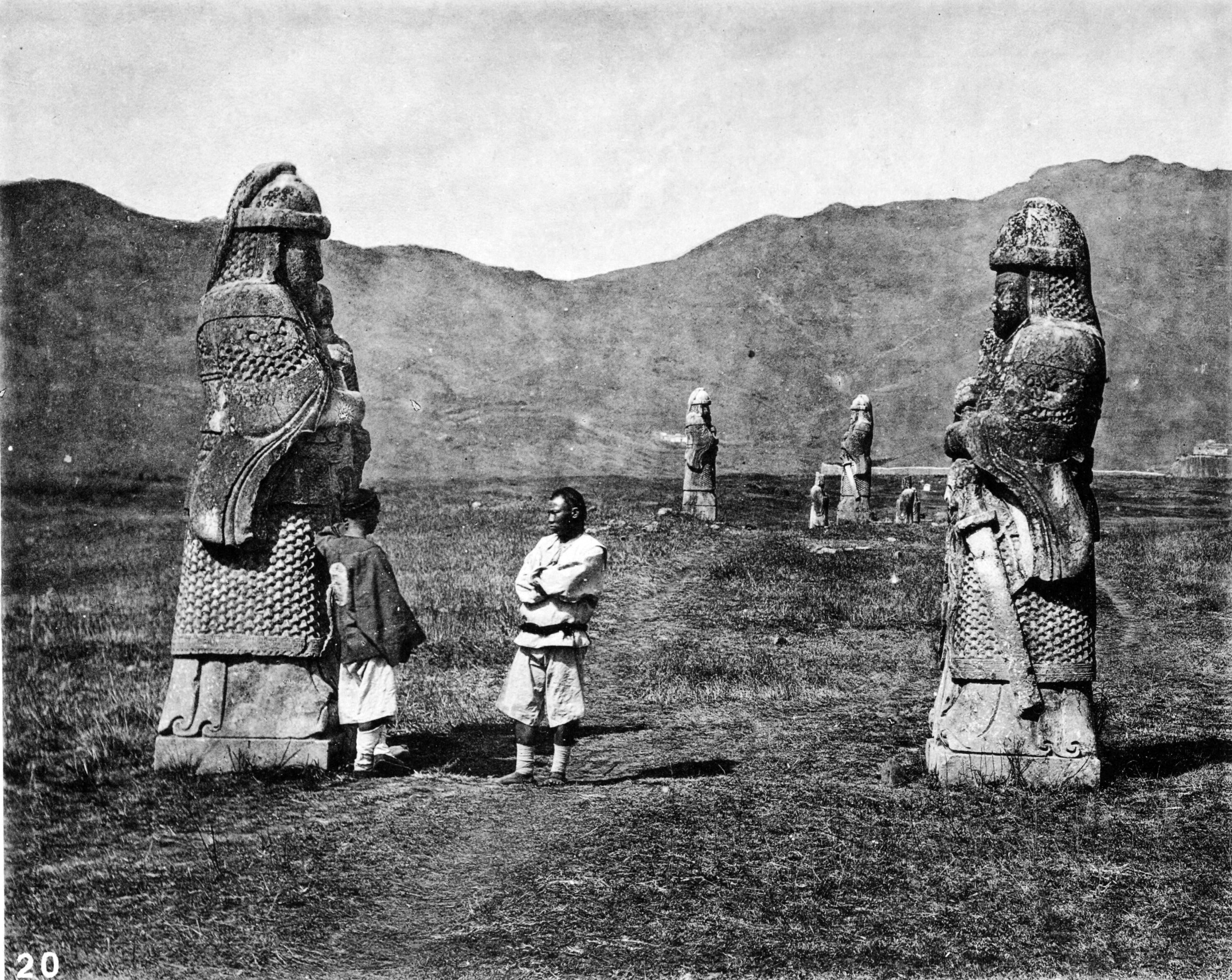
Tomb guard statues at the Hongwu Emperor's mausoleum, 19th century

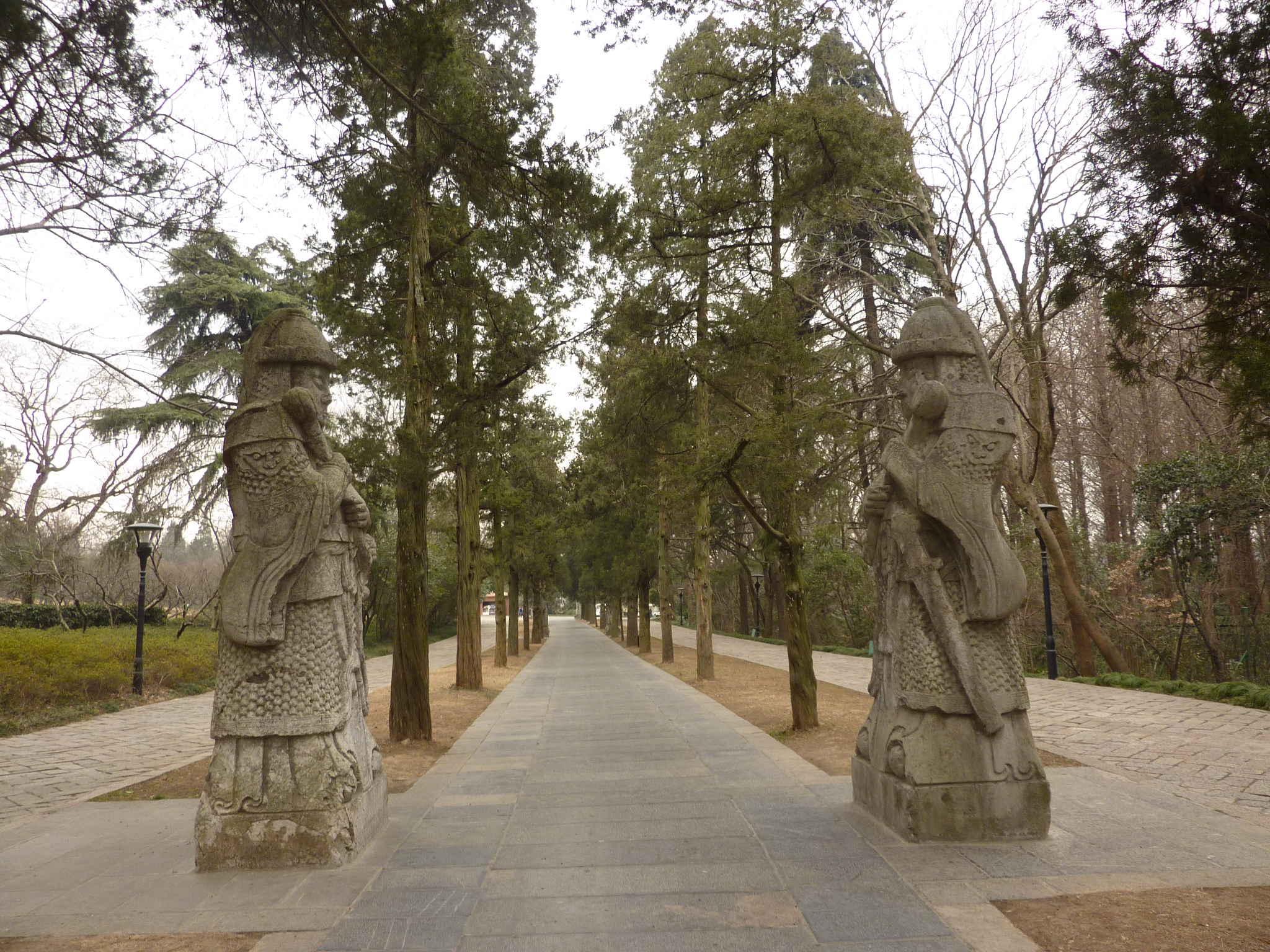
Tomb guardian statues on the Wengzhong Road, modern day

After the Ming–Mong Mao War Si Lunfa was forced to accept Ming suzerainty while the Ming recognized Mong Mao as a semi-independent tusi. In addition the Ming agreed to aid Mong Mao against the Kingdom of Ava and other rivals in Burma.

In 1393 Si Lunfa invaded Ava. Despite the fact that he was ultimately defeated, Ava sent an envoy to the Ming seeking their help in deterring Mong Mao aggression. Acknowledging their position, the Hongwu Emperor sent a letter to Si Lunfa in 1396 warning him of retaliation if further acts of aggression were committed:

Recently, I have heard that you have foolishly aggressed against your neighbouring states, with the intention of expanding your territory and illegally gaining more people. Also, you plan to attack our South-west. Verily, this cannot be permitted! … You, Si Lun-fa have not maintained good relations with your neighbours, and instead have sent troops in three directions, stupidly annexing other states. Such is your greed and your plotting. The states surrounding Lu-chuan have, from ancient times until now, all had their own rulers. They have never been united...But I now warn you to content yourself with what you have at present. If you are not satisfied with what you have at present and move to take more, then you will either lose everything or perish. Thus, would it not be best to just look after that which you have at present?

— Ming Shilu

Si Lunfa acquiesced to Ming demands. After Mong Mao stopped their military expansion, Si Lunfa began to welcome foreigners such as Buddhists and former Chinese soldiers into his people's traditional territory. Si Lunfa converted to Buddhism and gave gifts to the Chinese for bringing with them the technology of gunpowder and cannons. This greatly angered the traditional elements in his court and in 1397 Si Lunfa was deposed by the leader of an anti-foreigner faction, Dao Ganmeng, and fled to the Ming government for protection. According to the Ming Shilu:

Dao Gan-meng hated them [the outsiders] and thus, together with his subordinates, rebelled. He then led his troops to attack Teng-chong Prefecture [to the east into Ming controlled Yunnan]. Si Lun-fa, afraid of Gan-meng's power, fled to Yun-nan and the Xi-ping Marquis Mu Chun sent him to the [Ming] capital

— Ming Shilu

After reaching the Ming capital, Si Lunfa enlisted the Hongwu Emperor's aid in returning him to power. The emperor, desiring peace in the southwest, agreed to his petition and allocated 100 taels of gold, 150 taels of silver, and 500 ding of paper money to his cause. The Marquis of Xiping, Mu Chun, was assigned to provide Si Lunfa military support and retake Mong Mao.

== Battle ==
They returned to Yunnan and stayed in Baoshan while Mu Chun sent the commanders He Fu and Qu Neng with 5,000 troops to oust Dao Ganmeng. The expedition was met with initial success in battle, killing a Mong Mao chieftain, and routing his army, but arrived at an impasse when they failed to take a mountain stockade due to unfavorable terrain. He Fu relayed his situation to Mu Chun, who came to his aid with 500 cavalrymen, and in the midst of night advanced on the enemy position taking them by surprise. While they successfully took the stockade, Mu Chun died soon after from an illness and was replaced by He Fu, who captured Dao Ganmeng and installed Si Lunfa as ruler of Mong Mao once again in 1398.

== Aftermath ==
Si Lunfa died a year later and a new generation of elites rose to power in Mong Mao. His son Si Hangfa, together with Dao Hun and Dao Cuan, conducted short lived raids on Ming territory before military retaliation by the Yunnan guard forced them to stop.

Ming interest in Yunnan and the southwest waned in the following years as the court's attention turned to the civil war between the Jianwen Emperor and his uncle Zhu Di. Following the civil war, the Yongle Emperor became preoccupied with his efforts in pacifying the Northern Yuan, and engaged in several campaigns in Outer Mongolia as well as conducted an invasion of the Hồ dynasty.

== Bibliography ==
- Andrade, Tonio (2016), The Gunpowder Age: China, Military Innovation, and the Rise of the West in World History, Princeton University Press, ISBN 978-0-691-13597-7.
- Dardess, John (2012), Ming China 1368-1644 A Concise History of A Resilient Empire, Rowman & Littlefield Publishers, Inc.
- Fernquest, John (2006), Crucible of War: Burma and the Ming in the Tai Frontier Zone (1382-1454)
- Liew, Foon Ming (1996), The Luchuan-Pingmian Campaigns (1436-1449) in the Light of Official Chinese Historiography
- Scott, J.G (1900), Gazetteer of Upper Burma and the Shan States. Part 1, Volume 1.
