= Ming Veritable Records =

Imperial annals of Ming dynasty emperors

A page from volume two of Xiaozong Shilu of the Ming Veritable Records

The Ming Veritable Records or Ming Shilu (traditional Chinese: 明實錄; simplified Chinese: 明实录; lit. 'Veritable Records of Ming'), contains the imperial annals of the emperors of the Ming dynasty (1368–1644). It is the single largest historical source of information on the dynasty and consists of 2,909 volumes and more than 16 million words in total. According to modern historians, it "plays an extremely important role in the historical reconstruction of Ming society and politics." After the fall of the Ming dynasty, the Ming Veritable Records were used as a primary source for the compilation of the History of Ming by the Qing dynasty.

== Historical sources ==
The Veritable Records (shilu) for each emperor was composed after the emperor's death by a History Office appointed by the Grand Secretariat using different types of historical sources, such as:

1. "The Qiju zhu (Chinese: 起居注; pinyin: qǐjūzhù), or 'Diaries of Activity and Repose'. These were daily records of the actions and words of the Emperor in court."
2. "The 'Daily Records' (Chinese: 日曆; pinyin: rìlì). These records, established precisely as a source for the compilation of the Veritable Records, were compiled by a committee on the basis of the diaries and other written sources."
3. Other sources such as materials collected from provincial centres and "culled from other official sources such as memorials, ministerial papers and the Metropolitan Gazette."

== List of books ==
Veritable Records	Emperor
Taizu Shilu (太祖實錄)	Emperor Taizu of Ming a.k.a. the Hongwu Emperor
Taizong Shilu (太宗實錄)	Emperor Taizong of Ming a.k.a. the Yongle Emperor (including the preceding Jianwen Emperor's reign)
Renzong Shilu (仁宗實錄)	Emperor Renzong of Ming a.k.a. Hongxi Emperor
Xuanzong Shilu (宣宗實錄)	Emperor Xuanzong of Ming a.k.a. Xuande Emperor
Yingzong Shilu (英宗實錄)	Emperor Yingzong of Ming (including the Zhengtong and Tianshun reigns, separated by the Jingtai reign)
Xianzong Shilu (憲宗實錄)	Emperor Xianzong of Ming a.k.a. the Chenghua
Xiaozong Shilu (孝宗實錄)	Emperor Xiaoping of Ming a.k.a. the Hongzhi
Wuzong Shilu (武宗實錄)	Emperor Wuzong of Ming a.k.a. the Zhengde Emperor
Shizong Shilu (世宗實錄)	Emperor Shizong of Ming a.k.a. the Jiajing Emperor
Muzong Shilu (穆宗實錄)	Emperor Muzong of Ming a.k.a. the Longqing Emperor
Shenzong Shilu (神宗實錄)	Emperor Shenzong of Ming a.k.a. the Wanli Emperor
Guangzong Shilu (光宗實錄)	Emperor Guangzong a.k.a. the Taichang Emperor
Xizong Shilu (熹宗實錄)	Emperor Xizong of Ming a.k.a. the Tianqi Emperor

== See also ==
- History of Ming
