= Zhu Fu (prince) =

Chinese prince (1364–1428)

Zhu Fu 朱榑
- Prince of Qi
- Born: 28 December 1364
- Died: 1428 (aged 63–64)
Posthumous name
- Prince Gong of Qi (Note: Simplified Chinese: 齐恭王; traditional Chinese: 齊恭王; pinyin: Qí Gōngwáng)
- House: Zhu
- Father: Hongwu Emperor
- Mother: Lady Da

Chinese name
- Chinese: 朱榑
Transcriptions
Standard Mandarin
- Hanyu Pinyin: Zhū Fù

Zhu Fu (28 December 1364 – 1428) was an imperial prince of the Ming dynasty of China. He was the seventh son of the dynasty's founder, Hongwu Emperor. In 1370, he was granted the title of Prince of Qi, and in 1382, he relocated to Qingzhou, Shandong. From 1399 to 1403, and again in 1406, he was stripped of his title and rank.

== Biography ==
Zhu Fu was born on 28 December 1364 as the seventh son of Zhu Yuanzhang. His mother, Lady Da, was one of Zhu's concubines. At the time, Zhu Yuanzhang was based in Nanjing and was a prominent rebel leader during the Red Turban Rebellion, an uprising in China against the Mongol-led Yuan dynasty. The rebellion sought to restore Han Chinese rule after decades of Mongol domination following the Yuan conquest of the Song dynasty in 1279. In 1368, Zhu Yuanzhang founded the Ming dynasty and became the Hongwu Emperor. In May 1370, he bestowed the title of prince (王; wang) upon nine of his sons, including Zhu Fu who became the Prince of Qi (齊王).

As a child, Zhu Fu developed a close relationship with his half-brother Zhu Di, who was four years his senior. In the late 1370s, he received training in the arts of war alongside other princes in Fengyang. Upon reaching adulthood in 1382, he relocated to Qingzhou in Shandong Province, where he oversaw the local troops. During the 1390s, he played a role in commanding Ming armies during border conflicts with the Mongols. However, the Hongwu Emperor often reprimanded Zhu Fu and his brothers for their arrogance and misuse of power.

In 1398, the Hongwu Emperor died and was succeeded by his grandson, the Jianwen Emperor. The new government implemented a policy of "reducing the feudatories" to curb the influence of imperial princes. Zhu Fu was among those targeted, losing his title and authority in June 1399 and being placed under house arrest in Nanjing. Zhu Di rebelled in August 1399 and defeated the Jianwen Emperor after a three-year civil war. He took the throne as the Yongle Emperor on 17 July 1402. One of the new emperor's first acts was to release Zhu Fu and restore his title, along with those of other princes.

Zhu Fu was stripped of his princely rank once again in 1406 due to his violent behavior. He died in 1428. In 1646, the Longwu Emperor of the Southern Ming dynasty restored Zhu Fu's princely title and gave him the posthumous name "Gong".

Zhu Fu had four sons. His eldest son, Xianting, was his heir (世子 賢烶). His second son, whose name is unknown, was the Prince of Le'an (樂安王). His third son was Zhu Xianjun, Prince of Changshan (長山王 朱賢焌), and his fourth son was Zhu Xianbin, Prince of Pingyuan (平原王 朱賢賓). After Zhu Fu was stripped of his princely rank, his sons were also demoted to commoners and placed under confinement in Nanjing.

== Notes ==
Zhu Fu (prince) House of Zhu Born: 1364 Died: 1428
Chinese royalty
New creation	Prince of Qi; 1370–1399; 1403–1406	Title abolished
