= Yang Jing (Ming dynasty) =

Chinese general (d. 1382)

Yang Jing (Chinese: 杨璟; Chinese: 楊璟; pinyin: Yáng Jǐng; d. 1382), posthumous name Duke Wuxin of Rui (芮武信公), was a Ming dynasty general. He was a native of Hefei, Anhui.

Yang Jing, in his early years, pledged allegiance to Zhu Yuanzhang (the future Hongwu Emperor) and entered military service at Jiqing (present-day Nanjing). At this time, Zhu Yuanzhang had emerged as a leading commander of the Red Turban Rebellions against the Yuan dynasty. Following the conquest of Changzhou, he was appointed Vice Commander of the Guards (親軍副都指揮使). He subsequently campaigned in Wuzhou and other regions, and his merits led to his promotion as Assistant Administrator of Huguang Province (湖廣行省參政), with his headquarters at Jiangling. Later, he commanded the offensive against Hunan and was further elevated to the position of Manager of Governmental Affairs of the province (行省平章政事). In 1367, he joined Zhou Dexing (周德興) and Zhang Bin (張彬) in an expedition against Guangxi, and the next year, he captured Yongzhou and Jingjiang, pacifying the province. He thereafter participated in the campaigns of Tang He and Xu Da against Shanxi. In 1368, Zhu Yuanzhang proclaimed himself emperor and established the Ming dynasty. Two years later, in recognition of his achievements, Yang was created Marquis of Yingyang (營陽侯), and dispatched to Sichuan to persuade the Ming Xia ruler to surrender, although the mission was unsuccessful.

Yang Jing had two sons. His eldest, Yang Tong (楊通), inherited his father’s title. In 1387, he was ordered to lead surrendered Yuan troops to garrison Yunnan; however, many deserted en route, and he was consequently demoted to Commander of Puding Garrison. The second son, Yang Da (楊達), held a minor official post.
