= Zhu Zhi (prince) =

Chinese prince (1377–1424)

Zhu Zhi 朱植

Prince of Liao
- Tenure: 1392–1424
- Successor: Zhu Guixia
- Born: 24 March 1377
- Died: 4 June 1424
Names
- Zhu Zhi (朱植)
Posthumous name
- Prince Jian of Liao (遼簡王)
- House: Zhu
- Father: Hongwu Emperor
- Mother: Consort Han

Zhu Zhi (Chinese: 朱植; 24 March 1377 – 4 June 1424) was the 15th son of the Hongwu Emperor and Consort Han. (Note: She was a native from Goryeo.) He was initially made the Prince of Wei (衛王; 1378–1392), later changed to Prince of Liao (遼王). He was ancestor of the last Ming prince to refuse to capitulate to the Qing, Zhu Shugui, Prince of Ningjing. Zhu Zhi's heirs used the generation names "Gui, Hao, En, Chong, Zhi, Yun, Reng, Qi, Bao, He, Xian, Shu, Yan, Zun, Ru, Cai, Han, Li, Long, Yu".

== Consorts and issue ==
- Princess Consort of Liao, of the Guo clan (遼王妃 郭氏), (Note: She was made Princess consort of Liao in 1394.) daughter of Guo Ying (郭英)
- Lady, of the Ding clan (丁氏)
  - Zhu Guiwei, Prince Su of Liao (朱貴燰 遼肅王; 1399–1471), fourth son
- Lady, of the Lu clan (呂氏)
  - Zhu Guichang, Prince Anxi of Xiangyin (湘陰安僖王 朱貴焻; 1413–1467), tenth son
  - Zhu Guixi, Prince Jinghe of Qishui (蘄水靖和王 朱貴熡; 1424–1468), 20th son
- Lady, of the Xie clan (謝氏)
  - Zhu Guishu, Prince Zhuanghe of Hengyang (衡陽莊和王 朱貴㷂; 1414–1457), 12th son
  - Zhu Guiyu, Prince Gongxiang of Yuanling (沅陵恭憲王 朱貴燏; 1415–1372), 17th
  - Zhu Guiyu, Prince Daoxi of Mayang (麻陽悼僖王 朱貴燠; 1417–1442), 18th son
  - Zhu Guichan, Prince Gonghui of Hengshan (衡山恭惠王 朱貴煘; 1421–1476), Prince Gonghui of Hengshan, 19th son
- Lady, of the Xue clan (薛氏)
  - Zhu Guifu, Prince Anxi of Yiyang (益陽安僖王 朱貴烰, 1412–1448), ninth son
- Lady, of the Zhao clan (趙氏)
  - Zhu Guinie, Prince Daogong of Yingshan (應山悼恭王 朱貴㸎; 1414–1446), 14th son
- Lady, of the Song clan (宋氏)
  - Zhu Guiyi, Prince Zhuanghui of Zhijiang (枝江莊惠王 朱貴熠; 1415–1453), 16th son
- Lady, of the Zhang clan (張氏)
  - Zhu Guiheng, Prince Anhui of Songzi (松滋安惠王 朱貴烆; 1404–1442), eighth son
- Unknown
  - Zhu Guiying (朱貴煐; 25 July 1397 – 1424), first son
  - Zhu Guixia (朱貴烚; 29 December 1397 – 1449), second son
  - Zhu Guixie, Prince of Yuanan (遠安王 朱貴燮; 1399–1466), third son
  - Zhu Guixuan (朱貴煐; 1400–1452), fifth son
  - Zhu Guidun, Prince of Qiangjiang (潛江王 朱貴炖; 1401–1407), sixth son
  - Zhu Guiling, Prince of Yidu (宜都王 朱貴燯;1 403–1406), seventh son
  - Eleventh son
  - Thirteenth son
  - Zhu Guijie, Prince Kangjian of Yicheng (宜城康簡王朱 朱貴㸅; 1414–1474), 15th son
  - Princess Jiangling (江陵郡主), first daughter
  - Princess Jianghua (江華郡主), ninth daughter
  - Princess Luxi (瀘溪郡主), tenth daughter
  - Princess Zhushan (竹山郡主), 11th daughter
  - Princess Suining (綏寧郡主), 12th daughter
  - Princess Guidong (桂東郡主), 13th daughter

(Thirteen daughters)
