= Prince of Shu (Ming dynasty) =

Member of the Chinese Ming Royal family

Prince of Shu (Chinese: 秦王) was a first-rank princely peerage of the Ming dynasty. The princedom was created in 1378 by the Hongwu Emperor for his second son, Zhu Chun. The fief was located in Chengdu, Anhui (Fengyang)

== Generation names / poem ==
The generation poem given by Hongwu Emperor was:

"Yue You Shen Bin Rang, Cheng Xuan Feng Zhi Ping, Mao Jin Shen Zi Yi, Duan Ju Wu Mu Qing"
悅友申賓讓，承宣奉至平。懋進深滋益，端居務穆清

The main line members used the poem until the name "Ping" (平), which was the same generation as Tianqi Emperor and Chongzhen Emperor.

== Princedom of Shu ==
- Zhu Chun (朱椿, 1371-1423) - Hongwu Emperor's 11th son for whom the peerage was created in 1378, held the title until his death in 1423 and was posthumously honoured as Prince Xian of Shu (蜀献王)
  - Zhu Yuelian (朱悦燫, 1388-1409), Zhu Chun's eldest son who held the title of Hereditary Prince, then honoured posthumously as Hereditary Prince Daozhuang (悼庄世子), posthumously promoted to Prince Zhuang of Shu (蜀庄王)
    - Zhu Youyu (朱有堉, 1401-1431), Zhu Yuelian's eldest son who held the title of Grandson of Prince of Shu before his father's death, inherited the princely title of Prince of Shu in 1423 after Zhu Chun's death and Zhu Yuezhao's comfinement for attempted usurpation of princedom. Died childless and was posthumously honoued as Prince Jing of Shu (蜀靖王)
    - Zhu Youxun (朱有熏, 1409-1434), Zhu Yuelian's 3rd son who held the title of Prince of Luojiang since 1424, held the title of Prince of Shu until 1434 and was poshumously honoured as Prince Xi of Shu (蜀僖王)
  - Zhu Yuezhao (朱悦照, 1397-1461), Zhu Chun's 5th son who inherited the title in 1434 and held it until 1461 and was posthumously honoured as Prince He of Shu (蜀和王)
    - Zhu Yougai (朱友垓, 1419-1463), Zhu Yuezhao's eldest son who held the title in 1463 and was posthumously honoured as Prince Ding of Shu (蜀定王)
      - Zhu Shenyi (朱申鈘, 1448-1471), Zhu Yougai's eldest son who held the title from 1464 to 1471, remained childless and was posthumously honoured as Prince Huai of Shu (蜀怀王)
      - Zhu Shenzao (朱申枣, 18 July 1458 - 9 October 1493), Zhu Yougai's 3rd son who held the title of Prince of Tongjiang and inherited the peerage from Zhu Shenyi from 1472 to 1493 and was posthumously honoured as Prince Hui of Shu (蜀惠王)
        - Zhu Binhan (朱宾瀚, 28 November 1480 - 3 February 1506), Zhu Shenzao's eldest son who held the princely title from 1493 to 1506 and was posthumously honoured as Prince Zhao of Shu (蜀昭王)
          - Zhu Rangxu (朱让栩, 1501-1547), Zhu Binhan's eldest son who held the title from 1506 to 1547 and was posthumously honoured as Prince Cheng of Shu (蜀成王)
            - Zhu Chengyue (朱承爚, 1524-1558), Zhu Rangxu's 3rd son who held the title from 1547 to 1558 and was posthumously honoured as Prince Kang of Shu (蜀康王)
              - Zhu Xuanyin (朱宣圻, 1548-1612), Zhu Chengyue's eldest son who held the title from 1560 to 1612 and was posthumously honoured as Prince Duan of Shu (蜀端王)
                - Zhu Fengquan (朱奉铨, 1568-1617), Zhu Xuanyin's eldest son who was designated a Hereditary Prince from 1578, inherited the princedom in 1615, held the princely title until 1617 and was posthumously honoured as Prince Gong of Shu (蜀恭王)
                  - Zhu Zhishu (朱至澍, 1592 - 9 September 1644), Zhu Fengquan's eldest son who initially was designated as Grandson of Prince of Shu in 1606, promoted to Hereditary Prince in 1616, inherited the princedom in 1617, held it until the revolt of Zhang Xianzhong and was posthumously honoured by Southern Ming as Prince Min of Shu (蜀愍王)
                    - Zhu Pingkui (朱平樻, after 1626 - 1662), Zhu Zhishu's eldest son and Hereditary Prince who was honoured by Longwu Emperor as Prince of Shu in 1645 and held it until the downfall of the Southern Ming and his suicide in 1662.

== Cadet lines ==
=== Survived ===
==== Prince of Huayang (华阳王) ====
Title created in 1404 for Zhu Yueyao, Zhu Chun's 2nd son. Their fief was located in Lizhou (澧州).

- Zhu Yueyao (朱悦耀, 1404-1434) - Held the title from 1404 to 1434 and was posthumously honoured as Prince Daoyin of Huayang (华阳悼隐王)
  - Zhu Youhun (朱友珲, 1423-1473) - Zhu Yueyao's eldest son who held the title from 1434 to 1473 and was posthumously honoured as Prince Kangjian of Huayang (华阳康简王)
    - Zhu Shenkui (朱申奎, 1443-1484) - Zhu Youhun's eldest son who held the title from 1476 to 1479 when he was deprived oh his title and was posthumously honoured as Prince Daokang of Huayang (华阳悼康王), consort lady Xu (许氏) and lady Shao Miaoqing (邵妙清)
      - Zhu Bincheng (朱宾泟, 1480-1528) - Zhu Shenkui's eldest son who held the title from 1492 to 1528 and was posthumously honoured as Prince Gongshun of Huayang (华阳恭顺王)
        - Zhu Ranghe (朱让核, 1504 - before 1528) - Zhu Bingcheng's eldest son who held the title of Eldest Prince since 1510 and was posthumously honoured as Prince Kangxi of Huayang (华阳康僖王)
          - Zhu Chengjue (朱承爝, 1510s-1573/1546) - Zhu Ranghe's eldest son who governed princedom of Huayang as clan councillor (管华阳王府事) since 1531, inherited the title of prince of Huayang in 1534, held the title until his death and was posthumously honoured as Prince Zhuangjing of Huayang (华阳庄靖王)
            - Zhu Xuanshan (朱宣墡, 1530s-1597) - Zhu Chengjue's eldest son who held the title of Eldest Prince since 1560, inherited the princely title in 1585, held the title until 1597 and was posthumously honoured as Prince Wenyi of Huayang (华阳温懿王)
              - Zhu Fengyun (朱奉鈗, 1557-1612) - Zhu Xuanshan's eldest son who held the title of Eldest Prince until 1600 when he inherited princely title, held it until 1612 and was posthumously honoured as Prince Anhui of Huayang (华阳安惠王)
                - Zhu Zhihuan (朱至患漶 1581-1647) - Zhu Fengyun's eldest son who held the title of Grandson of Prince of Huayang since 1594, promoted to Eldest Prince in 1602, then inherited the title of Prince of Huayang in 1615, held it until 1647 before having been captured and died near Beijing
                  - Zhu Pingque (朱平[木悫]), Zhu Zhihuan's eldest son and Eldest Prince

==== Prince of Neijiang (内江王) ====
- Zhu Youfan (朱友墦, 1431 - 1512), Zhu Yuezhao's second son who was granted the title in 1446 and held it until 1512 and was posthumously honoured as Prince Zhuangyi of Neijiang (内江庄懿王)
  - Zhu Shenfu (朱申鉘, 1454 - 1497), Zhu Yuefan's eldest son who held the title of Eldest Prince from 1467 to 1497
    - Zhu Binzhi (朱宾沚, 1491-1544), Zhu Shenfu's eldest son who inherited the princely title in 1518 and held it until 1544 and was posthumously honoured as Prince Kangjing of Neijiang (内江康靖王)
      - Zhu Rangfen (朱让枌, d. 1539), Zhu Binzhi's eldest son who held the title of Eldest Prince from 1519 to 1539
        - Zhu Chengqing (朱承㷫, 1538-1567), Zhu Rangfen's eldest son who inherited the princely title in 1551 and held it until 1567 and was posthumously honoured as Prince Gongding of Neijiang (内江恭定王)
          - Zhu Xuan'e (朱宣堮, d. 1608), Zhu Chengqing's eldest son who inherited the peerage in 1570, held the princely title until 1608 and was posthumously honoured as Prince Gongmu of Neijiang (内江恭穆王)
            - Zhu Fengge (朱奉⿰金割), Zhu Xuan'e's eldest son who held the title of Eldest Prince
            - Zhu Fengtiao (朱奉鋚, d. 1613), Zhu Xuan'e's second son who held the title of defender general, was promoted to Eldest Prince in 1609, inherited the princedom in 1612, held the title of Prince of Neijiang until 1613 and was not posthumously honoured
              - Zhu Zhiqin (朱至沂), Zhu Fengyou's eldest son who was an Eldest Prince since 1614, held the title of Prince of Neijiang from 1614 to 1644 until the surrender to Qing court.

==== Prince of Deyang (德阳王) ====
- Zhu Youwei (朱友㙎, 1434-1475), Zhu Yuezhao's 3rd son who was granted the title in 1446 and held it until 1475 and was posthumously honoured as Prince Xi'an of Deyang (德阳僖安王)
  - Zhu Shenji (朱申𫓯, before 1457 - 1521), Zhu Youwei's eldest son who held the princely title from 1477 to 1521 and was posthumously honoured as Prince Gongyu of Deyang (德阳恭裕王)
    - Zhu Binyi (朱宾灉, before 1479 - 1548), Zhu Shenji's eldest son who held the princely title from 1521 to 1548. Due to his lack of male heir, i.e. premature death of his only son, the peerage was abolished.
    - Zhu Bin?
      - Zhu Rangju (朱让桔), Zhu Shenji's grandson, clansman managing the princedom, who applied to inherit the title of Prince of Deyang and was refused.
        - Zhu Chengba (朱承炦), Zhu Rangju's son who held the title of fengguo jiangjun (state general) and managed the princedom since 1565
          - Zhu XuanX (朱宣X, d. 1607), Zhu Chengba's son, clansman, zhenguo zhongwei (defender lieutenant) who managed the princedom until 1607
            - Zhu Fengqiao (朱奉釥), Zhu XuanX's second son, clansman who managed the princedom since 1609
            - Zhu Fenggui (朱奉匮; before 1603-?), Zhu XuanX's 5th son
            - N/A
              - Zhu Zhijun (朱至濬), clansman who inherited the princely title and held it until his surrender to Qing in 1660.

==== Prince of Shiquan (石泉王) ====
- Zhu YouX (朱友X, 1440-1511), Zhu Yuezhao's 4th son who was granted the title in 1460 and held it until 1511 and was posthumously honoured as Prince Rongmu of Shiquan (石泉荣穆王)
  - Zhu Shenbo (朱申镈, d. 1540), Zhu YouX's eldest son who held the princely title from 1517 to 1540 and was posthumously honoured as Prince Gongjian of Shiquan (石泉恭简王)
    - Zhu Binqing (朱宾清, d. 1565), Zhu Shenbo's eldest son who held the princely title from 1545 to 1565 and was posthumously honoured as Prince Kanghui of Shiquan (石泉康会王)
      - Zhu Rangji (朱让机, d. 1583), Zhu Binqing's eldest son who held the princely title from 1570 to 1583 and was not posthumously honoured
        - Zhu Chengyu (朱承㷒, d. 1608), Zhu Rangji's eldest son who initally held the title of Eldest Grandson from 1568, inherited the princely title in 1586 and held it until 1608 and was not posthumously honoured
          - Zhu Xuanni (朱宣堄, d. before 1645), Zhu Chengyu's eldest son who initially held the title of Eldest Prince from 1599, inherited the princely title in 1612 and held it until his death and was not posthumously honoured
            - Zhu FengX (朱奉X, d. 1662), Zhu Xuanni's son who inherited the title in 1645 and held it until 1662 under the Southern Ming

==== Prince of Wenchuan (汶川王) ====
- Zhu Youchan (朱有㙴, 1444-1473), Zhu Yuezhao's 5th son who was granted the title in 1460 and held it until 1473 and was posthumously honoured as Prince Yijian of Wenchuan (汶川懿简王)
  - Zhu Shenxiao (朱申销, d. 1542), Zhu Youchan's eldest son who held the title from 1478 to 1542 and was posthumously honoured as Prince Rongkang of Wenchuan (汶川荣康王)
    - Zhu Binsha (朱宾沙, 1485-1561), Zhu Shenxiao's eldest son who held the title from 1545 to 1561 and was posthumously honoured as Prince Gongxi of Wenchuan (汶川恭僖王)
      - Zhu Rangli (朱让杝, 1510-1560), Zhu Binsha's eldest son who held the title of Eldest Prince from 1551 to 1560 and was not posthumously honoured
        - Zhu Chengjiong (朱承炯, d. 1598), Zhu Rangli's eldest son who inherited the princely title in 1566 and held it until 1598 and was posthumously honoured as Prince Anhui of Wenchuan (汶川安惠王)
          - Zhu Xuanpiao (⿰票⿱夊隹, d. before 1608), Zhu Chengjiong's eldest son who held the title of Eldest Prince from 1578, inherited the princely title in 1600, held it until his death and was not posthumously honoured
            - Zhu Fengméi (朱奉镅, d. 1607), Zhu Xuanpiao's eldest son who held the title of Eldest Grandson since 1592, was promoted to Eldest Prince in 1597 and held the title of Eldest Prince until 1607 and was not posthumously honoured
            - Zhu Fenglang (朱奉锒, d. 1608), Zhu Xuanpiao's second son who held the title of Eldest Prince from 1607 to 1608, inherited the princely title in 1608 and died that year
            - Zhu Fengmei (朱奉鋂), Zhu Xuanpiao's son who inherited the princely title in 1608 and held it until his death
    - Zhu BinX, fuguo jiangjun (辅国将军)
      - Zhu Rangkao (朱让栲), Zhu BinX's son who was a clan councillor (宗正) held the title of fengguo jiangjun (奉国将军)
        - Zhu Chengwei (朱承燰), Zhu Rangkao's son who held the title of zhenguo zhongwei (镇国中尉)
          - Zhu Xuankao (朱宣𡌃), Zhu Chengwei's son who held the title of fuguo zhongwei (辅国中尉)
            - Zhu Fengyi (朱奉钅伊, 1614-1644), Zhu Xuankao's son who held the title of fengguo zhongwei (奉国中尉), became jinshi of 1627 after passing Keju and rendered civil service

==== Prince of Qingfu (庆符王) ====
- Zhu Youpiao (朱友墂, 1449-1505), Zhu Yuezhao's 6th son who was granted the title in 1464 and held it until 1505 and was posthumously honoured as Prince Gongxi of Qingfu (庆符恭僖王)
  - Zhu Shenlin (朱申麟/鏻), Zhu Youpiao's eldest son who died prematurely
  - Zhu Shendun (朱申镦), Zhu Youpiao's second son who initially held the title of defender general (zhenguo jiangjun, ), inherited the princely title in 1507, held it until 1532 and was posthumously honoured as Prince Duanshun of Qingfu (庆符端顺王)
    - Zhu Binzhan (朱宾沾, d. 1566), Zhu Shendun's eldest son who held the princely title from 1537 to 1566 and was posthumously honoured as Prince Gonghe of Qingfu (庆符恭和王)
      - Zhu Rangyi (朱让檥舣, d. 1604), Zhu Binzhan's eldest son who held the princely title from 1568 to 1604 and was posthumously honoured as Prince Kangding of Qingfu (庆符康定王)
        - Zhu Chengmo (朱承魩/火勿, d. 1612), Zhu Rangyi's eldest son who initially was an Eldest Prince, inherited the princely title in 1604 and held it until 1612 and was not posthumosly honoured
          - Zhu Xuanhe (朱宣壑, d. 1644), Zhu Chengmo's second son who initially held the title of Eldest Prince in 1612, inherited the princely title the same year and held it until the collapse of Ming dynasty in 1644 and was not posthumously honoured
            - Zhu Fengzhu (朱奉铸), Zhu XuanX's son who held the title of Eldest Prince

==== Prince of Nanchuan (南川王) ====
- Zhu Shenju (朱申锯, 1461-1532), Zhu Yougai's 4th son who was granted the title in 1471 and held it until 1532 and was posthumously honoured as Prince Anjing of Nanchuan (南川安靖王)
  - Zhu Binhu (朱宾淴, before 1481 - ?), Zhu Shenju's eldest son who held the title of Eldest Prince and died prematurely
    - Zhu Rangzhan (朱让榐), Zhu Binhu's eldest son who held the title of Eldest Grandson
  - Zhu Blinlan (朱宾灠/漤, before 1483 - ?), Zhu Shenju's second son who held the title of defender general (zhenguo jiangjun, 镇国将军), was promoted to Eldest Prince and posthumously honoured as Prince of Nanchuan (南川王)
    - Zhu Rangxi (朱让樨, d. 1577), Zhu Binlan's eldest son who inherited the princely title in 1535 and held it until 1577 and was not posthumously honoured
      - Zhu Chengye (朱承煠), Zhu Rangxi's eldest son who held the title of defender general (zhenguo jiangjun, 镇国将军), was promoted to Eldest Prince in 1572 and posthumously honoured as Prince of Nanchuan (南川王)
        - Zhu Xuandi (朱宣䴞, d. 1602), Zhu Chengye's eldest son who held the princely title from 1582 to 1602 and was posthumously honoured as Prince Kangxi of Nanchuan ()
          - Zhu Fengcai (朱奉金采, d. 1612), Zhu Xuandi's eldest son who held the princely title from 1604 to 1612 and was not posthumously honoured
            - Zhu Zhixiang (朱至湘), Zhu Fengcai's eldest son who held the princely title since 1617

==== Prince of Jiang'an (江安王) ====
- Zhu Xuanzhi (朱宣址, d. 1593), Zhu Chengyue's second son who was granted the title and held it from 1562 to 1593 and was posthumously honoured as Prince Zhuangyu of Jiang'an (江安庄裕王)
  - Zhu Fengzhen (朱奉珍, d. 1615), Zhu Xuanzhi's first son who initially held the title fo Eldest Prince, inherited the princedom in 1593 and held the title of Prince of Jiang'an until 1615 and was not posthumously honoured
    - Zhu Zhiwei (朱至洧), Zhu Fengzhen's first son who held the title of Eldest Prince and died unmarried
    - Zhu Zhiqiu (朱至㳋), Zhu Fengzhen's 3rd son who inherited the title of Prince of Jiang'an in 1621

==== Prince of Dongxiang (东乡王) ====
- Zhu Fengsui (朱奉鐩, d. before 1625), Zhu Xuanyin's 5th son for whom the title of Prince of Dongxiang was created in 1600 and who held it until his death and was not posthumously honoured
  - Zhu Zhi'ou (朱至⿱艸漚), Zhu Fengsui's first son who held the title of Eldest Prince until 1625
  - Zhu Zhiqin (朱至芹), Zhu Fengsui's second son who held the title of Elder Prince since 1625 and inherited the title of Prince of Dongxiang in 1625

==== Prince of Yongchuan ====
- Zhu Yuexi (朱悦烯, 1407-1460), Zhu Chun's 7th son, who was granted the title in 1424 and held it until 1460 and was posthumoualy honoured as Prince Zhuangjian of Yongchuan (永川庄简王)
  - Zhu Youjin (长子朱有埐), Zhu Yuexi's son, held the title of Eldest Prince, who was dead before 1460.

==== Prince of Fushun (富顺王) ====
- Zhu ZhiX (朱至X, ?-?), Zhu Fengquan's 3rd son for whom the title was created in 1646 and who held the title until his death approx. 1646 and was not posthumously honoured
  - Zhu Pingding (朱平檙), Zhu ZhiX's son hel the title from 1646 to 1649 and was not posthumously honoured

=== Expired lines ===
The following cadet lines were extinct from various reasons, e.g. absorption into the princedom, lack of male heir or deprivation. There was a cadet line created specially to posthumously honour the clansman

==== Absorbed into the princedom ====
- Prince of Baoning (保宁王) - absorbed with Zhu Yuezhao in 1435
- Prince of Luojiang (罗江王) - absorbed with Zhu Youxun in 1431, created in 1424.
- Prince of Tongjiang (通江王) - created for Zhu Shenzao in 1471 and absorbed to princedom with him in 1472.

==== Abolished ====
- Prince of Deyang (德阳王) - abolished with Zhu Binyi, Zhu Youwei's grandson and Zhu Shenji's eldest son, after his child's premature death. Restored by the Southern Ming.

==== Extinct ====
- Prince of Chongqing (崇庆王) - extinct with Zhu Yuexin (朱悦炘), Zhu Chun's 4th son.
- Prince of Chongning (崇宁王) - extinct with Zhu Yuejun (朱悦燇), Zhu Chun's 3rd son.
- Prince of Yongchuan (永川王) - extinct in 1460 with Zhu Yuexi, Prince Zhuangjian (永川庄简王朱悦烯, 1407-1460), Zhu Chun's 7th son. The Eldest Prince Zhu Youjin (长子朱有埐) was dead before the promotion in 1441, which was the ground behind expiration of peerage.
- Prince of Qianjiang (黔江王) - extinct in 1426 with death of Zhu Youfu, Prince Daohuai of Qianjiang (黔江悼怀王朱有坿), Zhu Yuelian's 2nd son.
- Prince of Xinning (新宁王) - extinct after 1584 with death of Zhu Fengyi (朱奉)
- Prince of Longchang (隆昌王) - extinct with death of Zhu Fengqiang (朱奉锵), created for Zhu Fengqiang in 1603
- Prince of Fushun (富顺王) - extinct in 1649 with death of Zhu Pingding (朱平檙), created for Zhu ZhiX (朱至X) in 1616
- Prince of Taiping (太平王) - extinct in 1644 with death of Zhu Zhilu (朱至淥), created for him in 1616
- Prince of Anle (安乐王) - created in 1632 to posthumously honour Zhu Pingli (朱平理)
