= Zhu Mo =

Chinese prince (1380–1431)

Zhu Mo 朱模

Prince of Shen
- Tenure: 17 May 1391 – 11 June 1431
- Successor: Zhu Jiabao, Prince Kang
- Born: 1 September 1380
- Died: 11 June 1431 (aged 50)
Names
- Zhu Mo (朱模)
Posthumous name
- Prince Jian of Shen (瀋簡王)
- House: Zhu
- Father: Hongwu Emperor
- Mother: Noble Consort Zhao

Zhu Mo (Chinese: 朱模; 1 September 1380 – 11 June 1431) was a prince of the Ming dynasty. He was the 21st son of the Hongwu Emperor and was made the Prince of Shen (瀋王).

== Consorts and issue ==
- Princess consort of Shen, of the Zhang clan (瀋王妃 张氏;d.1406), daughter of Zhang Wenjie (张文傑)
- Lady, of the Zhang clan (章氏; d. 1451)
  - Zhu Jiabao, Prince Kang of Shen (瀋康王 朱佶焞; 7 December 1407 – 7 October 1457), first son
- Lady, of the Wu clan (吴氏)
  - Zhu Jikui, Prince Kangsu of Lingchun (陵川康肅王 朱佶煃), second son
  - Zhu Jiyun, Prince Daohuai of Qinshu (沁水悼懷王 朱佶熅), sixth son
- Lady, of the Xi clan (席氏)
  - Zhu Jiwei, Prince Xijing of Pingyao (平遙僖靖王 朱佶煟), third son
- Lady, of the Pang clan (庞氏)
  - Zhu Jijuan, Prince Daojing of Jishan (稷山悼靖王 朱佶焆), fifth son
- Unknown
  - Zhu Jiyu, Prince Zhaoxi of Lincheng (黎城昭僖王 朱佶燏), fourth son
  - Zhu Jitong (朱佶炵), seventh son
  - Zhu Jifu, Prince Gongding of Qinyuan (沁源恭定王 朱佶㷆), eighth son
  - First daughter
  - Princess Hunyuan (浑源郡主), second daughter
  - Princess Yicheng (翼城郡主), third daughter
  - Fourth daughter
  - Princess Hejing (河津郡主), fifth daughter
  - Princess Jiexiu (介休郡主), sixth daughter

== See also ==
- List of vassals prince peerages of Ming dynasty
