= Hongwu Emperor =

Emperor of China from 1368 to 1398

Hongwu Emperor 洪武帝
- A Seated Portrait of Ming Emperor Taizu, c. 1377

Emperor of the Ming dynasty
- Reign: 23 January 1368 – 24 June 1398
- Enthronement: 23 January 1368
- Successor: Jianwen Emperor

Emperor of China
- Reign: 1368–1398
- Predecessor: Toghon Temür (Yuan dynasty)
- Successor: Jianwen Emperor
- Born: Zhu Chongba (Note: Chinese: 朱重八; pinyin: Zhū Chóngbā); 21 October 1328 (Note: 21 October 1328 is the Julian calendar equivalent of the 18th day of the 9th month of the 1st year of the Tianli (天曆) regnal period of the Yuan dynasty. When calculated using the Proleptic Gregorian calendar, the date is 29 October.); Hao Prefecture, Henan Jiangbei
- Died: 24 June 1398 (aged 69); Ming Palace, Zhili
- Burial: 30 June 1398; Xiao Mausoleum, Nanjing
- Consort: Empress Xiaocigao (m. 1352; died 1382)
- Issue Detail: Zhu Biao, Crown Prince Yiwen; Zhu Shuang, Prince Min of Qin; Zhu Gang, Prince Gong of Jin; Yongle Emperor; Zhu Su, Prince Ding of Zhou; Zhu Zhen, Prince Zhao of Chu; Zhu Fu, Prince Gong of Qi; Zhu Gui, Prince Jian of Dai; Zhu Zhi, Prince Jian of Liao; Zhu Quan, Prince Xian of Ning; Zhu Mo, Prince Jian of Shen; Princess Lin'an; Princess Ningguo; Princess Anqing; Princess Huaiqing
Names
- Zhu Xingzong, (Note: Simplified Chinese: 朱兴宗; traditional Chinese: 朱興宗; pinyin: Zhū Xìngzōng); later Zhu Yuanzhang (Note: Chinese: 朱元璋; pinyin: Zhū Yuánzhāng)
Era dates
- Wu: (Note: Simplified Chinese: 吴; traditional Chinese: 吳; pinyin: Wú) 31 January 1367 – 23 January 1368; Hongwu: (Note: Chinese: 洪武; pinyin: Hóngwǔ) 23 January 1368 – 5 February 1399
Posthumous name
- Emperor Qinming Qiyun Junde Chenggong Tongtian Daxiao Gao (Note: Simplified Chinese: 钦明启运俊德成功统天大孝高皇帝; traditional Chinese: 欽明啟運俊德成功統天大孝高皇帝 (conferred by the Jianwen Emperor in 1398)); Emperor Shengshen Wenwu Qinming Qiyun Junde Chenggong Tongtian Daxiao Gao (Note: Simplified Chinese: 圣神文武钦明启运俊德成功统天大孝高皇帝; traditional Chinese: 聖神文武欽明啟運俊德成功統天大孝高皇帝 (conferred by the Yongle Emperor in 1403)); Emperor Kaitian Xingdao Zhaoji Liji Dasheng Zhishen Renwen Yiwu Junde Chenggong Gao (Note: Simplified Chinese: 开天行道肇纪立极大圣至神仁文义武俊德成功高皇帝; traditional Chinese: 開天行道肇紀立極大聖至神仁文義武俊德成功高皇帝 (changed by the Jiajing Emperor in 1538))
Temple name
- Taizu (Note: Chinese: 太祖; pinyin: Tàizǔ)
- House: Zhu
- Dynasty: Ming
- Father: Zhu Shizhen
- Mother: Lady Chen
- Religion: Buddhism

Chinese name
- Chinese: 洪武帝
Transcriptions
Standard Mandarin
- Hanyu Pinyin: Hóngwǔ Dì
- Wade–Giles: Hung^{2}-wu^{3} Ti^{4}
- IPA: [xʊ̌ŋ.ù tî]
Yue: Cantonese
- Yale Romanization: Hùhng-móuh dai
- Jyutping: Hung4-mou5 dai3
Southern Min
- Tâi-lô: Âng-bú tē

The Hongwu Emperor (21 October 1328 – 24 June 1398), personal name Zhu Yuanzhang, (Note: Courtesy name: Guorui (simplified Chinese: 国瑞; traditional Chinese: 國瑞; pinyin: Guóruì)) was the founding emperor of the Ming dynasty of China, reigning from 1368 to 1398.

Born in 1328 into a peasant family in Anhui, Zhu Yuanzhang grew up during a period of epidemics, famines, and widespread uprisings in China under the Mongol-led Yuan dynasty. When he was 16, his parents and brother died in an epidemic. The orphaned Zhu briefly lived as a novice monk, begging for alms and gaining insight into the hardships of the common people. He also developed a dislike for book-dependent scholars. In 1352, he joined the Red Turban rebels, a movement that sought to overthrow Yuan rule, and quickly rose to command his own army. He captured Nanjing in 1356 and built a powerful regional regime in southern China. He adopted Yuan administrative practices and applied them to his expanding territory. Although he nominally acknowledged the authority of the Red Turban figurehead Han Lin'er, Zhu increasingly acted independently and, after defeating rival rebels, declared himself King of Wu in 1364.

After successfully dominating southern and central China in early 1368, Zhu decided to rename the Kingdom of Wu to Da Ming, which translates to 'Great Radiance'. He adopted Hongwu, meaning 'Vastly Martial', as his era name. In the following four-year war, he drove out the Mongol forces loyal to the Yuan dynasty and unified the country, but failed to conquer Mongolia. During the Hongwu Emperor's 30-year reign, Ming China experienced significant growth and recovered from the effects of prolonged wars. The Emperor had a strong understanding of the structure of society and believed in implementing reforms to improve institutions. This approach differed from the Confucian belief that the ruler's moral example was the most important factor. The Hongwu Emperor also prioritized the safety of his people and the loyalty of his subordinates, demonstrating pragmatism and caution in military affairs. He maintained a disciplined army and made efforts to minimize the impact of war on civilians. He died in 1398 and was succeeded by his grandson, the Jianwen Emperor. In 1402, the Hongwu Emperor's fourth son, Zhu Di, overthrew the Jianwen Emperor following a civil war and took the throne as the Yongle Emperor.

== Early life ==
Zhu Yuanzhang, the future Hongwu Emperor, was born in 1328 in Zhongli (鍾離) village, in Haozhou (present-day Fengyang, Anhui), China, then ruled by the Mongol-led Yuan dynasty. He was the youngest of four sons born to the peasant family of Zhu Wusi and his wife, Lady Chen. He was given the name Zhu Chongba (朱重八) at birth, but used the name Zhu Xingzong (朱興宗) in adulthood. Later, as a rebel fighter against the Yuan dynasty, he used the name Zhu Yuanzhang, with the courtesy name Guorui, and posthumously renamed his father Zhu Shizhen. Zhu's grandfather and father fled across the Huai River valley to avoid tax collectors. His maternal grandfather was a fortune-teller and seer who, in his youth, had served in the army of the Song dynasty during its final struggle against the Mongols before the dynasty fell in 1279. His mother frequently told him stories imbued with a spirit of Song loyalism, which left a deep impression on him.

In 1344, Zhu's parents and one of his brothers died during a plague epidemic. Zhu then entered a local Buddhist monastery. For the next three years, he wandered as a novice monk, begging for alms and becoming familiar with the landscape and people of eastern Henan and western Anhui provinces. He returned to the monastery in 1348 and stayed for four years, during which he learned to read and write and studied the basics of Buddhism.

== Rise to power ==
=== Joining the rebels ===
The harsh taxation policies and famine, together with catastrophic flooding in the Yellow River basin caused by inadequate flood control measures, led to widespread opposition to the rule of the Yuan dynasty. The presence of Taoist and Buddhist secret societies and sects further fueled this discontent, the most prominent being the White Lotus society. In 1351, the Red Turban Rebellion erupted and quickly spread throughout northern China.

The initially disorganized Mongol troops were able to launch a counteroffensive and advance along the Grand Canal, a major waterway linking northern and southern China. In October 1352, the Mongols captured Xuzhou, causing the rebel commanders Peng Da and Zhao Yunyong to flee south to Haozhou, where the Yuan dynasty's power was declining. In Haozhou, Guo Zixing, Sun Deya (孫德崖), and three other leaders, with the support of the local elite, organized the army and established order in the surrounding area. Guo joined Peng, while his four colleagues joined Zhao.

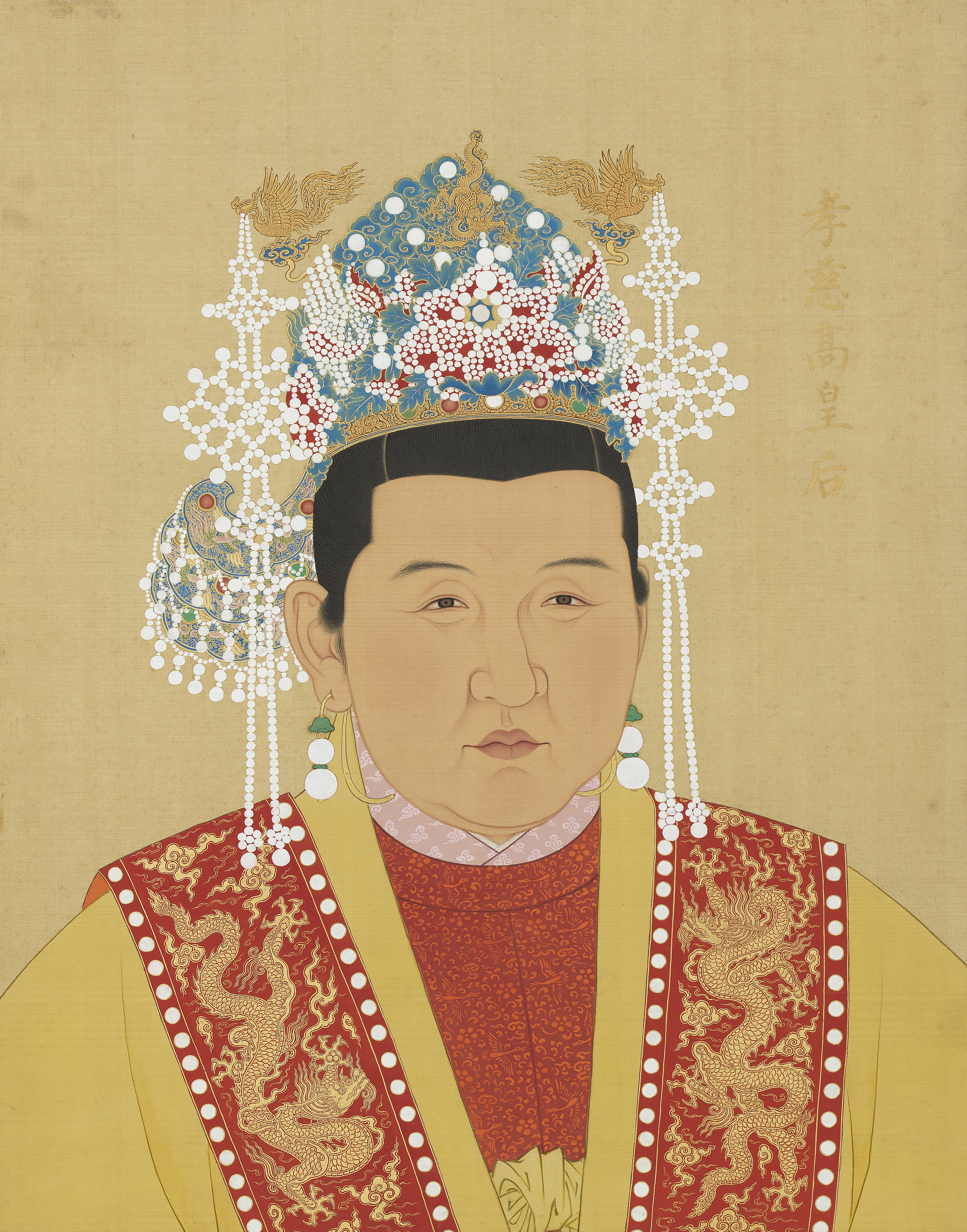
Portrait of Lady Ma, Zhu Yuanzhang's wife, as empress

Zhu joined the rebels in 1352, as the Yuan army burned down his monastery after suspecting the monks of links to the White Lotus society. On 15 April, he arrived in Haozhou. He began as a rank-and-file fighter. While he was considered physically unattractive, Zhu's exceptional leadership, decisiveness, martial skill, and intelligence quickly earned him significant authority. He became the leader among 24 of his acquaintances who had already joined the rebels. These acquaintances would eventually become generals in the Ming army. By the spring of 1353, Zhu was leading a 700-man squad, and he became Guo's most trusted subordinate. Skilled in both military tactics and political maneuvering, he married Guo's adopted daughter, surnamed Ma. Unlike other leaders of his time, who often appointed many relatives to important positions to secure loyalty, Zhu appointed only a few relatives.

The rivalry between Peng and Zhao escalated into further conflict. Zhao captured Guo but Zhu freed him, increasing Guo's reliance on Zhu. After Peng's death in 1353, Zhao emerged as the dominant leader in the region. He sent Guo to the east and Zhu with a small detachment to the south, hoping to divide and destroy them. However, Zhu successfully occupied several counties and bolstered his army to 20,000 soldiers, and Guo moved with Zhao's 10,000 men to join him.

=== Capture of Nanjing and rise as a regional power (1355–1360) ===
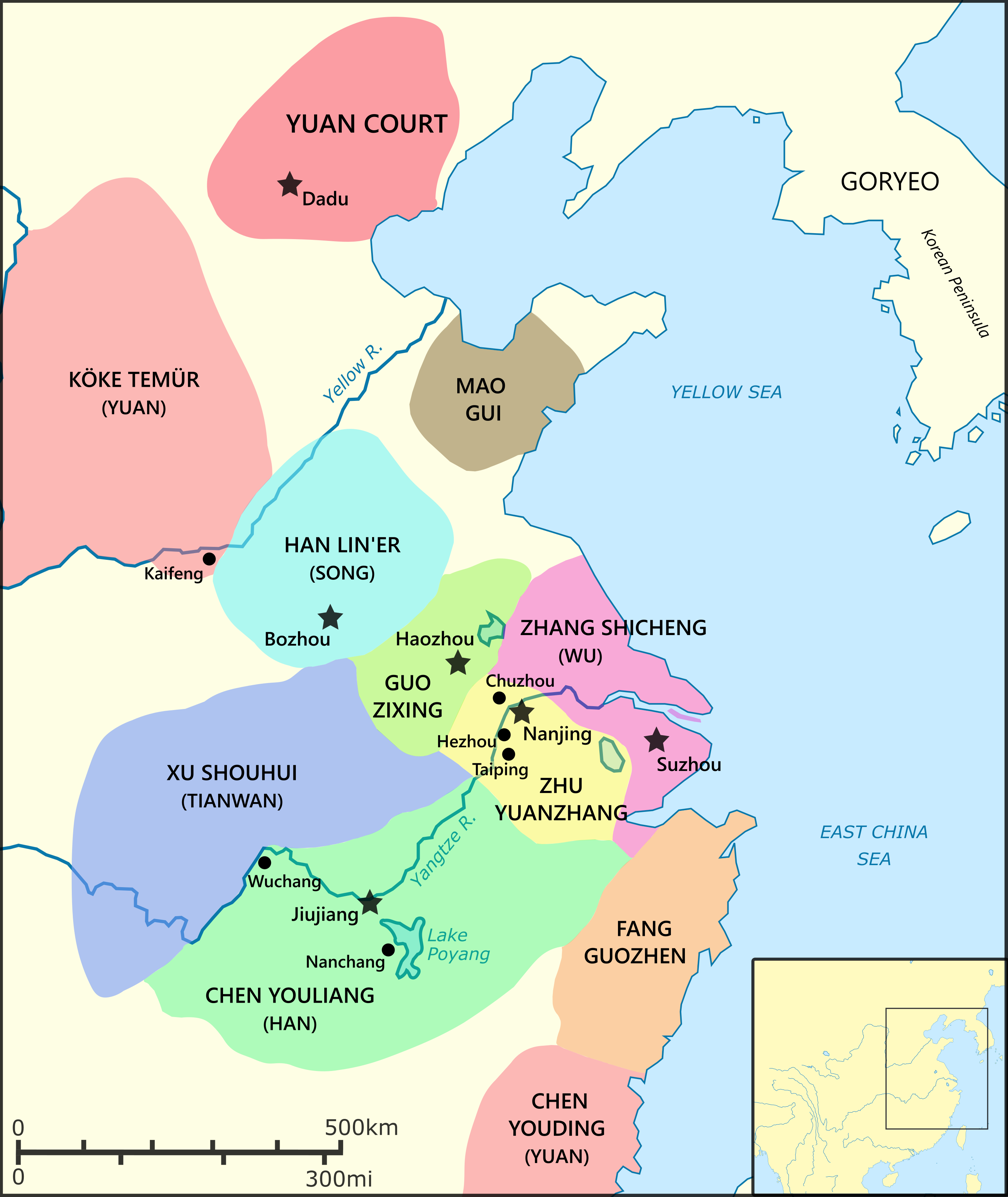
Major powers in China during the late Yuan dynasty, c. 1350–1360

At the beginning of 1355, Zhu, Guo, and the eastern rebel Zhang Shicheng decided to leave the devastated northern territories and cross the Yangtze River into the still-prosperous south. Guo and Zhu entered into a dispute over Hezhou, a city situated on the banks of the Yangtze, leading Zhu to ally with Guo's old enemy Sun Deya; Guo died before the conflict escalated. Han Lin'er, the Red Turban leader who claimed the title of Song emperor, then appointed Guo's eldest son, Guo Tianxu (郭天敍), as his successor, with Zhang Tianyu (張天祐), Guo's brother-in-law, as first deputy and Zhu as second deputy. In July 1355, the Hezhou rebels obtained a fleet from rebels arriving from Chao Lake, allowing them to cross the Yangtze River that same month and capture Taiping (present-day Dangtu County, Anhui), a Yuan stronghold on the river's southern bank. The local Yuan commander Chen Yexian (陳野先) attempted to retake Taiping but was defeated and surrendered to Zhu. Two months later, Guo Tianxu and Zhang Tianyu launched an attack on Jiqing (present-day Nanjing) using Chen's forces, but Chen betrayed them at a critical moment and all three were killed in the ensuing fighting.

In March 1356, Zhu once again marched on Jiqing. Chen Zhaoxian (陳兆先), Chen Yexian's nephew, had succeeded his uncle as commander. He and 36,000 troops surrendered to Zhu. In April 1356, Zhu successfully entered Jiqing, which he renamed Yingtian ('In response to Heaven'). In May 1356, Han Lin'er appointed Zhu as the head of Jiangnan Province (江南行中書省), one of the five provinces of the Song state. Zhu soon had Guo's younger son executed, citing a breach of military discipline. This allowed Zhu to establish clear leadership and he immediately began to build his administration, but he faced instances of betrayal and defection to the enemy until the victory at Lake Poyang in 1363.

Zhu now commanded an army of 100,000 soldiers, which was divided into divisions or wings (翼; yi). In Nanjing itself, there were eight divisions and one division per prefecture. From 1355 to 1357, he launched attacks against Zhang Shicheng in the direction of Suzhou and successfully occupied southern Jiangxi; (Note: He conquered Zhenjiang, Changzhou, Changxing, Jiangyin, Changshu, and Yangzhou.) after this, the border with Zhang's state was fortified on both sides and remained stable until 1366. In Zhejiang, from 1358 to 1359, Zhu controlled four impoverished inland prefectures, while Zhang held control over four prosperous northern coastal prefectures, and Fang Guozhen occupied the eastern coast of the province.

In the summer of 1359, the Mongol warlord Chaghan Temur drove Han Lin'er from Kaifeng. With only a few hundred soldiers left, Han survived in Anfeng, a prefectural city in the west of Anhui, while Chaghan Temur turned to Shandong. After this retreat, Song authority collapsed rapidly; aside from Zhu's effectively autonomous Jiangnan, no Song province remained after 1362. In 1361, Han appointed Zhu as Duke of Wu (Wu Guogong) (Note: Wu is a geographical term derived from the ancient state of Wu, which refers to the lower reaches of the Yangtze River.) and acknowledged his control over conquered territories. Fearing a Yuan advance toward Nanjing, Zhu initially sought cooperation with Chaghan Temur, but after the latter was assassinated in 1362, the Yuan ceased to be a threat and Zhu rejected their offer to make him governor of Jiangxi.

Zhu did not embrace Red Turban ideology; instead of building a new elite based on White Lotus Manichean-Buddhist beliefs, he aligned himself with Confucian scholars. This shift transformed him from a sectarian rebel into a political leader seeking traditional legitimacy, though he still relied on officers devoted to White Lotus teachings. His political base strengthened through his collaboration with Li Shanchang, a landowner from Dingyuan who managed civil administration as Zhu expanded. In 1360, after repeated requests, leading scholars such as Song Lian and Liu Ji joined him. Known as the Jinhua school, (Note: After the Jinhua Prefecture in Zhejiang, where they were concentrated.) they envisioned a unified state with a small but efficient bureaucracy, opposed the corruption of late Yuan rule, and believed that state institutions could improve public morals. Though their motives differed from Zhu's, they shared his commitment to reform through a strong state and active monarchy.

As an independent ruler, Zhu promoted moderate taxation, unlike other rebel leaders and generals who frequently seized peasants' grain for military needs. He emphasized orderly governance and peaceful life for the population, working with local elites and understanding villagers' needs due to his own peasant background. Zhu's principles strengthened the economy of his territories: he began minting coins in 1361, created monopolies on salt and tea, and resumed collecting customs duties in 1362. These policies increased tax revenues and helped finance his military campaigns.

=== Conquest of Han (1360–1365) ===
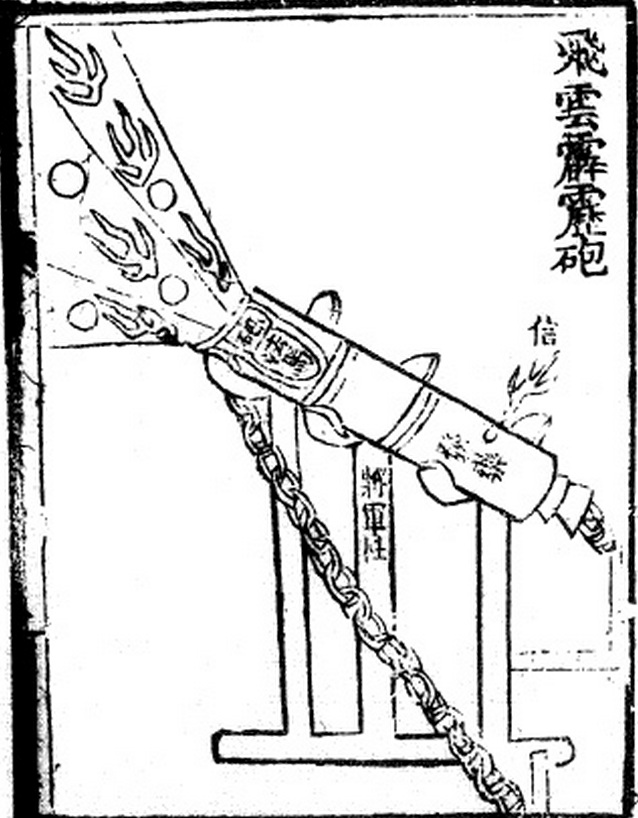
A cannon from the Huolongjing, compiled by Jiao Yu and Liu Ji before 1375

In the beginning of 1360, Zhu controlled the southwestern part of Jiangsu, all of Anhui south of the Yangtze River, and the inland of Zhejiang. By 1393, these territories had a population of 7.8 million, about 12.9% of the country's total population of 60.5 million. Zhang Shicheng's domain (Note: Zhang Shicheng proclaimed himself King of Zhou in 1354. In 1357, he abandoned his royal title and nominally submitted to the Yuan government, though he continued to rule his territory independently. In 1363, he proclaimed himself King of Wu and renounced allegiance to the Yuan dynasty.) had comparable power with a larger population but worse organization. The state of Han faced a similar situation. Founded by the rebel Chen Youliang in 1360, it was located west of Zhu's territory and included the provinces of Jiangxi and Hubei. Zhang, based in Suzhou, controlled the lower reaches of the Yangtze, from the eastern borders of Zhu's dominions to the sea. While Zhu, Zhang, and Chen divided up the Yangtze River Basin, "one-province" regimes controlled the rest of southern and central China. (Note: Fang Guozhen controlled the eastern Chinese coast, Ming Yuzhen ruled in Sichuan, and a trio of Yuan loyalists (Chen Youding, He Zhen, and Basalawarmi) controlled Fujian, Guangdong, and Yunnan.) These provincial regimes were unable to threaten the states of Zhu, Zhang, and Chen, but they were strong in defense.

The war between Zhu and Chen from 1360 to 1363 had a devastating impact on the balance of power in the Yangtze River Basin. This conflict increased Zhu's prestige and gave him a significant advantage over his rivals. The fighting began when Chen's army attacked Nanjing in 1360, but Zhu quickly defeated them. In 1361, the war spread to Chen's province of Jiangxi, which changed hands multiple times. By 1362, Zhu had gained control of Jiangxi.

In January 1363, Zhang Shicheng's army launched a surprise attack on Anfeng, the residence of Han Lin'er and his court. Zhu offered military support to Han Lin'er, who was still highly respected among the troops. The powerless Han was relocated to Chuzhou, west of Nanjing on the opposite side of the Yangtze River. Zhu's army remained stationed in the north until August 1363.

The departure of Zhu's main forces to the north presented Chen Youliang with an opportunity to turn the tide of the war. He quickly raised an army of 300,000, outnumbering Zhu's remaining forces. Chen planned to capture Nanchang and rally the local leaders in Jiangxi to join his cause and attack Nanjing, but the Nanchang garrison, led by Deng Yu, held out until early June 1363. In mid-August, Zhu's army and fleet finally set out from Nanjing with approximately 100,000 soldiers. Zhu's fleet defeated Chen's fleet in the Battle of Lake Poyang in September 1363, and Chen was killed during the fighting. Chen's general Zhang Dingbian fled to Wuchang, the Han capital, with Chen's young son Chen Li, and continued the war in his name. Although Zhang withstood a two-month siege of Wuchang in late 1363, he was unable to effectively resist Zhu's advancing forces. When Zhu's army again approached Wuchang in March 1364, he surrendered.

During 1364 and 1365, Zhu focused on conquering and absorbing the territories of Chen Han, whose commanders largely surrendered without resistance. By early 1365, Chang Yuchun and Deng Yu had gained control over central and southern Jiangxi, and Xu Da had pacified Huguang. This annexation of territories provided Zhu with a significant population advantage over his adversaries. The main threats to Zhu at this time were the Mongol warlord Köke Temür in northern China and Zhang Shicheng based in Suzhou.

Expansion of the army with former Han troops required a reorganization of the military. Therefore, in 1364, Zhu implemented the Weisuo system, which involved the formation of guards (wei) comprising 5,600 soldiers. These guards were further divided into 5 battalions (qianhusuo) of 1,120 soldiers each, with 10 companies (baihusuo) in each battalion. After 1364, the army was made up of 17 guards consisting of veterans who had previously served under Zhu before 1363. The older veterans were demobilized, while the remainder were assigned to the garrison in Nanjing, where they worked as peasants. Their production was used to supply the army. Other soldiers with shorter service, such as those from the conquest of southern Anhui and central Zhejiang, were stationed in the former Chen Han territories. Some served in field armies in Nanchang and Wuchang, and others in garrisons scattered across Jiangxi and Huguang. Soldiers in Chen Han territories, along with some veterans, were sent to fight against Zhang under the leadership of Xu Da and Chang Yuchun.

=== Defeat of Zhang Shicheng and establishment of the Ming dynasty (1364–1368) ===
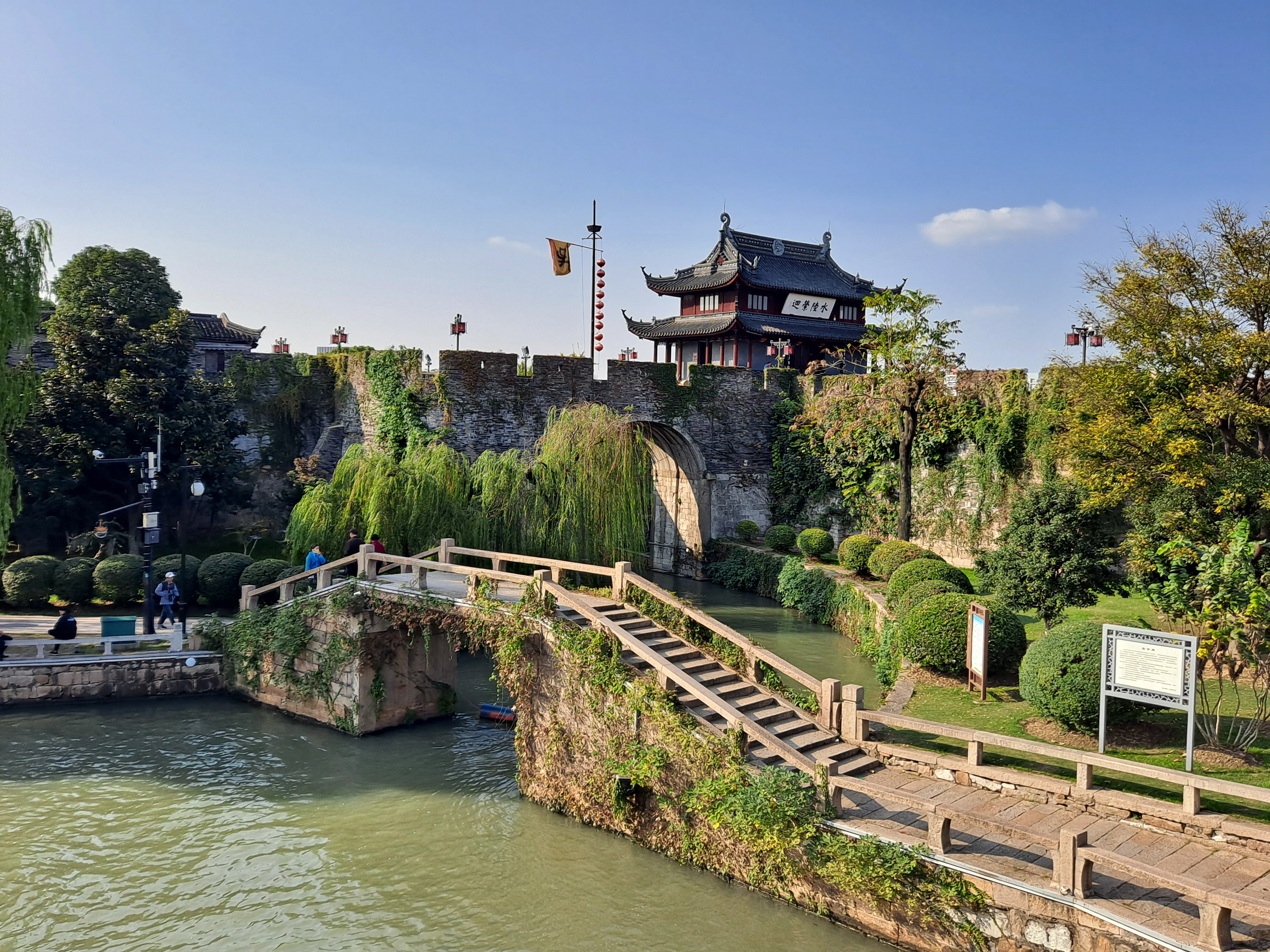
Pan Gate, one of the gates of the Suzhou City Wall. The ten-month conquest of Suzhou, the seat of Zhang Shicheng, was one of the fiercest battles fought by Zhu's troops.

After Chen's defeat, Zhu proclaimed himself King of Wu (Wu wang) on 4 February 1364. Zhang Shicheng had already adopted the same title in October 1363. Zhu still acknowledged his subordinate status to Han Lin'er and used the Song era of Longfeng as long as Han was alive, but he ran his own administration, following the model of the Yuan dynasty.

Zhang attempted to attack Zhu in late 1364, before Zhu could exploit the potential of the Chen Han territories, but Zhu repulsed Zhang's offensive in the spring of 1365. Before launching a final attack on Zhang's heartland, the Suzhou region, Zhu and his generals decided to first "cut off the wings" of Zhang's state by occupying the territory north of the Yangtze and the Zhang-controlled part of Zhejiang. Zhu appointed Xu Da as the supreme commander of the invading forces, and the campaign progressed rapidly due to their overwhelming superiority. The ten-month siege of Suzhou began in December 1366. On 1 October 1367, Zhu's forces breached the walls of Suzhou and captured Zhang, who later killed himself while being escorted to Nanjing.

In January 1367, Han Lin'er drowned in the Yangtze River. Zhu's state of Wu declared its formal independence and designated 1367 as the first year of the Wu era. On 23 January 1368, Zhu proclaimed himself emperor and renamed his state. Following Mongol tradition of elevating titles, he named the new dynasty the Great Ming (Da Ming; 大明). He also designated 1368 as the first year of the Hongwu era (洪武).

=== Southern campaigns and northern expeditions (1367–1382) ===
In the autumn of 1367, Zhu's troops launched an attack against Fang Guozhen. By December of that year, they had successfully taken control of the entire coast. In November 1367, Hu Mei's army, along with the fleets of Tang He and Liao Yongzhong (廖永忠), began their journey south. They had easily conquered Fujian by February 1368 and taken control of Guangdong by April. With reinforcements from Yang Jing's army in Huguang, Guangxi was brought under Ming control by July 1368.

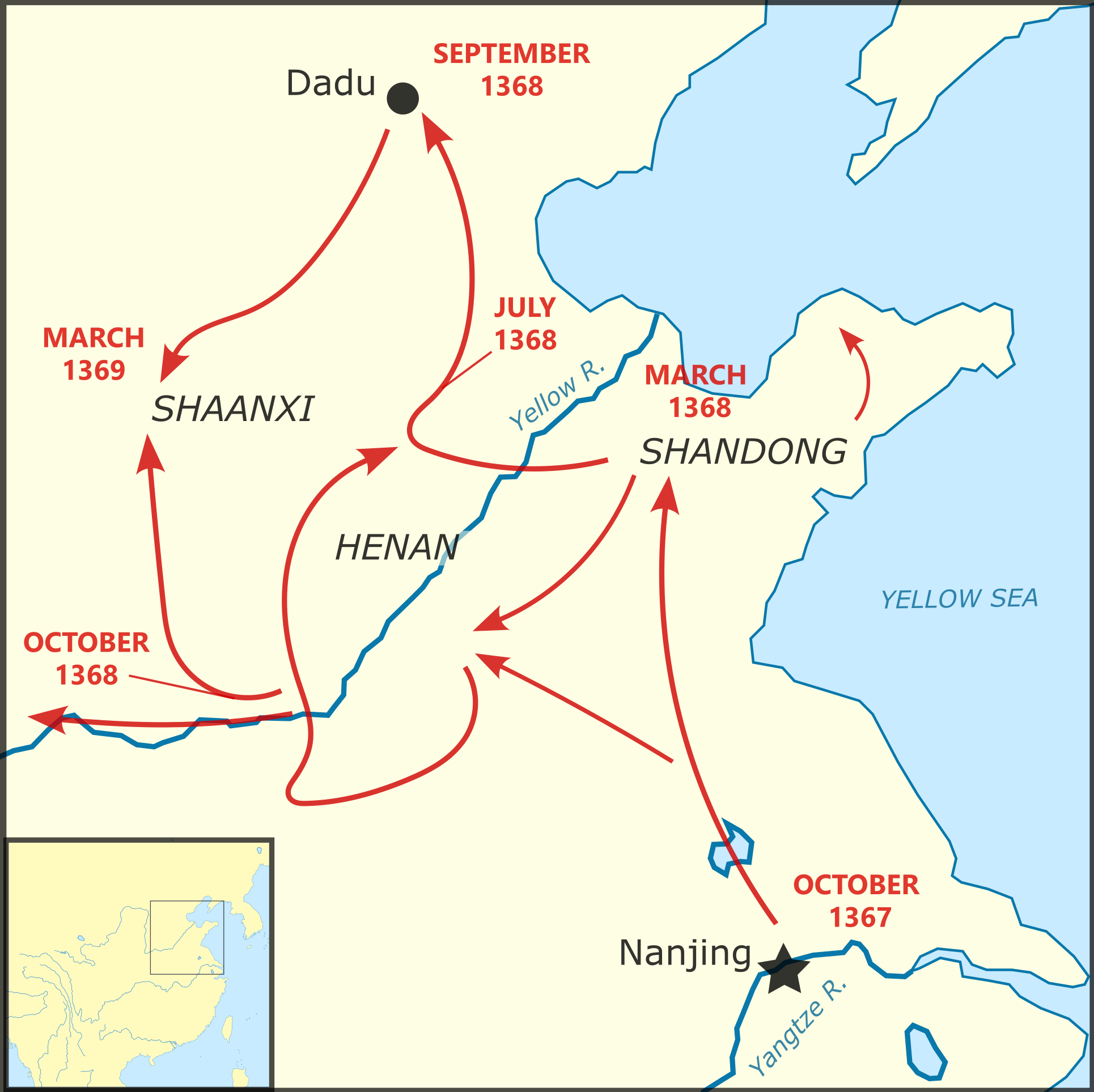
Map showing the Ming northern expedition of 1367–1369, which brought Yuan rule in China proper to an end

At the same time as the southern campaign, Zhu sent a 250,000-strong army, led by Xu Da and Chang Yuchun, to conquer the North China Plain. By March 1368, Ming land and naval forces had captured Shandong, and Henan was occupied in May. A pause was taken for agricultural work, during which the Hongwu Emperor met with his generals in the captured city of Kaifeng to confirm plans for the campaign. The Ming army resumed its march in mid-August and reached Dadu (present-day Beijing) in early September. They defeated the Mongol army outside Dadu and then occupied the city. The Yuan emperor Toghon Temür fled north to Shangdu. The Chinese renamed Dadu to Beiping (Pacified North). The campaign then continued with an attack on Shanxi. The main army, led by Xu Da, captured Taiyuan in January 1369, forcing Köke Temür to retreat to Gansu. Ming troops also began operations in Shaanxi in the spring of 1369. They had fully captured the province by September 1369, but border skirmishes with Köke Temür's troops persisted until 1370.

In 1370, the Ming government launched a two-pronged attack on Mongolia. The Emperor sent his nephew Li Wenzhong and the general Feng Sheng to attack from the north, while Xu Da attacked Köke Temür from Xi'an. Köke Temür was defeated in early May and fled to Karakorum. The Ming forces captured over 84,000 of his troops and continued to advance westward along the Yellow River. At the same time, Li's forces advanced to Shangdu, forcing Toghon Temür to retreat further north to Yingchang, where he died later that month. His son Ayushiridara then assumed the imperial title. In June, Li conquered Yingchang. Ayushiridara escaped, but the Ming army captured his wife and son, Maidilibala, along with more than 50,000 soldiers. Ayushiridara continued to flee until reaching Karakorum, where the remnants of Köke Temür's army joined him.

The Ming then shifted its focus to the Xia state in Sichuan, which maintained positive relations with the Ming but refused to submit. The Emperor ordered Fu Youde to lead an attack from the north in 1371. Simultaneously, Tang He and Liao Yongzhong advanced with a fleet up the Yangtze River. Although they initially faced resistance, they were able to push forward with the help of artillery and the enemy's decision to send part of their defenders north against the Ming army's successful advance. By September 1371, Sichuan had been conquered. This victory ensured stability in the southwestern border for the next ten years, until the Ming conquered the pro-Mongol Yunnan in 1381–1382.

In 1372, the Emperor launched a massive attack on Mongolia. Xu Da led a 150,000-strong army from Shanxi through the Gobi to Karakorum. In the west, Feng Sheng was assigned to conquer the western part of the Gansu Corridor with 50,000 cavalrymen, while Li Wenzhong was tasked with attacking eastern Mongolia and Manchuria with another 50,000 soldiers. Although Feng's forces were able to successfully complete their mission, the Mongols defeated Xu and Li's armies.

These failures in 1372 shattered the Hongwu Emperor's dream of controlling the entire Yuan Empire, both in China and on the steppe. Furthermore, Japanese piracy increased and rebellions broke out in the provinces of Guangxi, Huguang, Sichuan, and Shaanxi. Chinese forces in the north consequently shifted their focus to defense, and two years later returned the captured prince Maidilibala to Mongolia.

== 1370s: Reforms, consolidation, and stability ==
=== Law ===
The Hongwu Emperor was meticulous in his efforts to recreate the social order after the fall of the Yuan dynasty. He was a dynamic and innovative legislator, constantly issuing, revising, and modifying laws throughout his reign, but these frequent changes sometimes sparked protests from officials. The Emperor's legislation focused on four main themes: the restoration of order and morality in society, the regulation of the bureaucracy, the removal of corrupt and unreliable officials, and the prevention of natural decline. As the patriarch of the family, he aimed to prevent the decay of society and the dynasty, while also seeking to prevent his successors from changing his laws.

The compilation of the new code, known as the Great Ming Code, began in 1364. Heavily influenced by Confucian principles, it was largely based on the Tang Code of 653. Its initial wording was agreed upon in 1367, and the final version was adopted in 1397. The code remained unchanged until the fall of the dynasty, although provisions were added over time.

=== Capital city ===
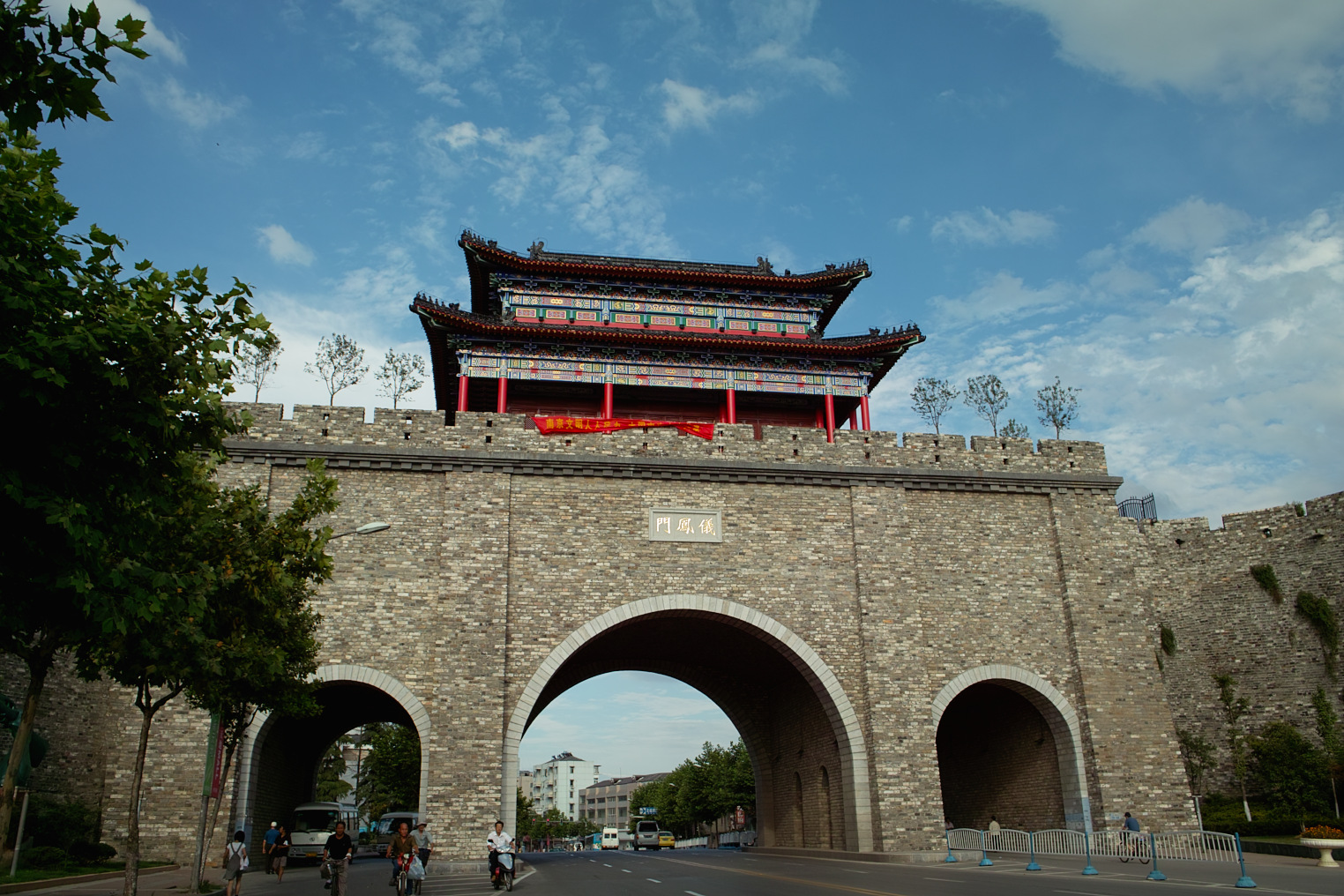
Yifeng Gate, part of the Nanjing city wall built during the Hongwu era

The capital of the empire was Nanjing ('Southern Capital'), which was known as Yingtian until 1368. In the 1360s and 1370s, Nanjing underwent extensive construction. A workforce of 200,000 individuals surrounded the city with walls that were almost 26 km (16 mi) long, making them the longest in the world at the time. An imperial palace and government quarter were built. In 1368, the Emperor resided in Kaifeng during the months of June–August and October–November, leading to the city being known as Beijing (Note: Beijing refers to Kaifeng, which was temporarily designated the "Northern Capital", rather than the present-day city of Beijing.) ('Northern Capital').

In 1369, the Hongwu Emperor proposed a debate on the relocation of the capital. It was decided in August of that year that the capital would be moved to Fengyang (then known as Linhuai), his hometown in northern Anhui. Construction of the future capital, named Zhongdu (中都; 'Central Capital'), began with grand plans. The area had been largely abandoned since the famine of the 1340s, so landless families from the south were resettled in Fengyang. The Emperor ultimately abandoned the idea of relocating the capital in 1375 and the construction was halted.

=== Central government ===
Upon ascending to the throne, the Hongwu Emperor appointed his wife, Lady Ma, as empress and his eldest son, Zhu Biao, as his heir. He surrounded himself with a group of military and civilian figures, but the civil officials never attained the same level of prestige and influence as the military. In 1367, he granted the title of duke (gong) to three of his closest collaborators—the generals Xu Da and Chang Yuchun and the official Li Shanchang. After establishing the Ming dynasty, he also bestowed ranks and titles upon a wider circle of loyal generals. (Note: In 1370, 34 distinguished generals were appointed as dukes and marquises (hou). Out of these, 6 dukes and 14 marquises were among the original 24 companions of the Hongwu Emperor, 5 marquises joined in 1355 during the crossing of the Yangtze River (they belonged to the rebels from Lake Chao who laid the foundation for Zhu's fleet), and 9 marquises were former enemy commanders who surrendered. By 1380, the Emperor had appointed another 14 marquises from the aforementioned groups. They were all granted land and income from the state treasury, but not as fiefs.) These military leaders were chosen based on their abilities, but their positions were often inherited by their sons. The generals thus became the dominant ruling class, surpassing the bureaucracy in power and influence. The officials had little political autonomy and simply carried out the emperor's orders and requests. This system mirrored the one established during the Yuan dynasty, the ruling class of Mongols and Semu being replaced by families of distinguished military commanders. These families were often connected through kinship ties with each other and with the imperial family. The Emperor initially restricted the number of palace eunuchs to 100, but he later allowed their number to increase to 400, on the condition that they were not allowed to learn to read, write, or interfere in politics.

The administrative structure of the Ming dynasty was based on the Yuan model. The Central Secretariat led the civil administration and was headed by two grand chancellors who were informally known as prime ministers. (Note: Li Shanchang served as left grand chancellor and Xu Da as right grand chancellor from 1368 to 1371. Xu briefly succeeded Li as left grand chancellor in 1371, after which the office remained vacant until Hu Weiyong's appointment in 1377. Wang Guangyang held the office of right grand chancellor from 1371 to 1373 and again from 1377 to 1380, while Hu Weiyong served in that position between 1373 and 1377 before becoming left grand chancellor. Hu and Wang were the last holders of the two offices before the abolition of the chancellorship in 1380.) The Secretariat was responsible for six ministries: Personnel, Revenue, Rites, War, Justice, and Works. The Censorate oversaw the administration, while the Chief Military Commission was in charge of the army. Initially, the provinces were under the control of generals, with the civil authorities reporting to them. In the 1370s, the military's influence decreased as ministers were appointed to leadership positions in the provinces. Regional military commanders were then responsible for managing the affairs of hereditary soldiers in the Weisuo system.

The Weisuo system was introduced in 1364 and stabilized in the 1370s. Soldiers under this system were obligated hereditarily to serve; each family was required to provide one member for military service in each generation. The army was self-sufficient thanks to the production of these hereditary soldiers. By 1393, the empire's armed forces consisted of 326 guards and 65 battalions, but after 1368, the army may have been larger than necessary, as the government feared the consequences of widespread demobilization.

The state administration was reformed based on Confucian principles. In February 1371, the Emperor made the decision to hold provincial and county examinations every three years, augmenting the provincial examinations already taking place in March. In 1377, he cancelled the civil service examinations due to their lack of connection to the quality of the graduates. Despite his support for Confucianism, the Emperor had a deep distrust for the official class and did not hesitate to severely punish them for any wrongdoing. Following the restoration of the examinations in 1384, he ordered the execution of the chief examiner when it was discovered that only southern candidates had been awarded the jinshi, the highest degree in the examination system.

=== Local government and taxation ===
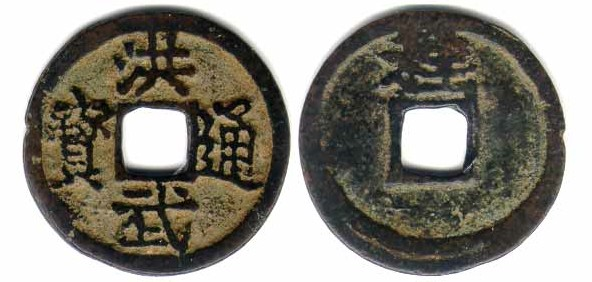
Hongwu Tongbao, the cash coin used during the Hongwu era

The villages were self-governing communities that resolved internal disputes without interference from officials, as the Hongwu Emperor did not recommend their presence in the countryside. These communities operated based on Confucian morality rather than laws. The Yellow Registers recorded households and population, while the Fish-Scale Registers recorded land parcels, their quality, tax quotas, and ownership. County authorities appointed wealthy individuals as regional tax captains (liangzhang; 糧長) responsible for collecting taxes. The lijia system of local self-government was introduced in the Yangtze River basin in 1371. (Note: A li contained 110 households, consisting of ten jia with ten households each, as well as the ten leading families who were typically the wealthiest. These families were responsible for appointing headmen to collect taxes and oversee service labor, as well as providing services such as education.) Regular state expenses, except for land tax, were covered through mandatory services and supplies from the population. In the lijia system, one jia always provided services, and after a year, another jia replaced it. This form of taxation was progressive, unlike the land tax. Large infrastructure projects, such as road and dam construction or canals, were funded through additional ad hoc requisitions.

Taxes were low, with a fixed amount for each region, intended for peasants to pay 3% of their harvest. These taxes were often collected in kind, with the population responsible for delivering goods to state warehouses, but the transportation of these goods, often over long distances of hundreds of kilometers, placed a heavy burden on taxpayers. The cost of transporting grain to Nanjing was three to four times higher than its price, and even six to seven times higher for supplies to the army on the northern border. The Ministry of Revenue was responsible for collecting taxes and benefits from peasants, while the Ministry of Works oversaw artisans. Artisans were required to work in state factories for three months every 2 to 5 years, depending on their profession. The Ministry of War kept records of hereditary soldiers and also collected taxes and benefits from them. As state income and expenditure were managed through orders for the population to deliver specific goods to designated locations, large warehouses were not necessary. However, officials were not always able to effectively direct supplies to the necessary places, leading to local supply crises.

=== Society ===
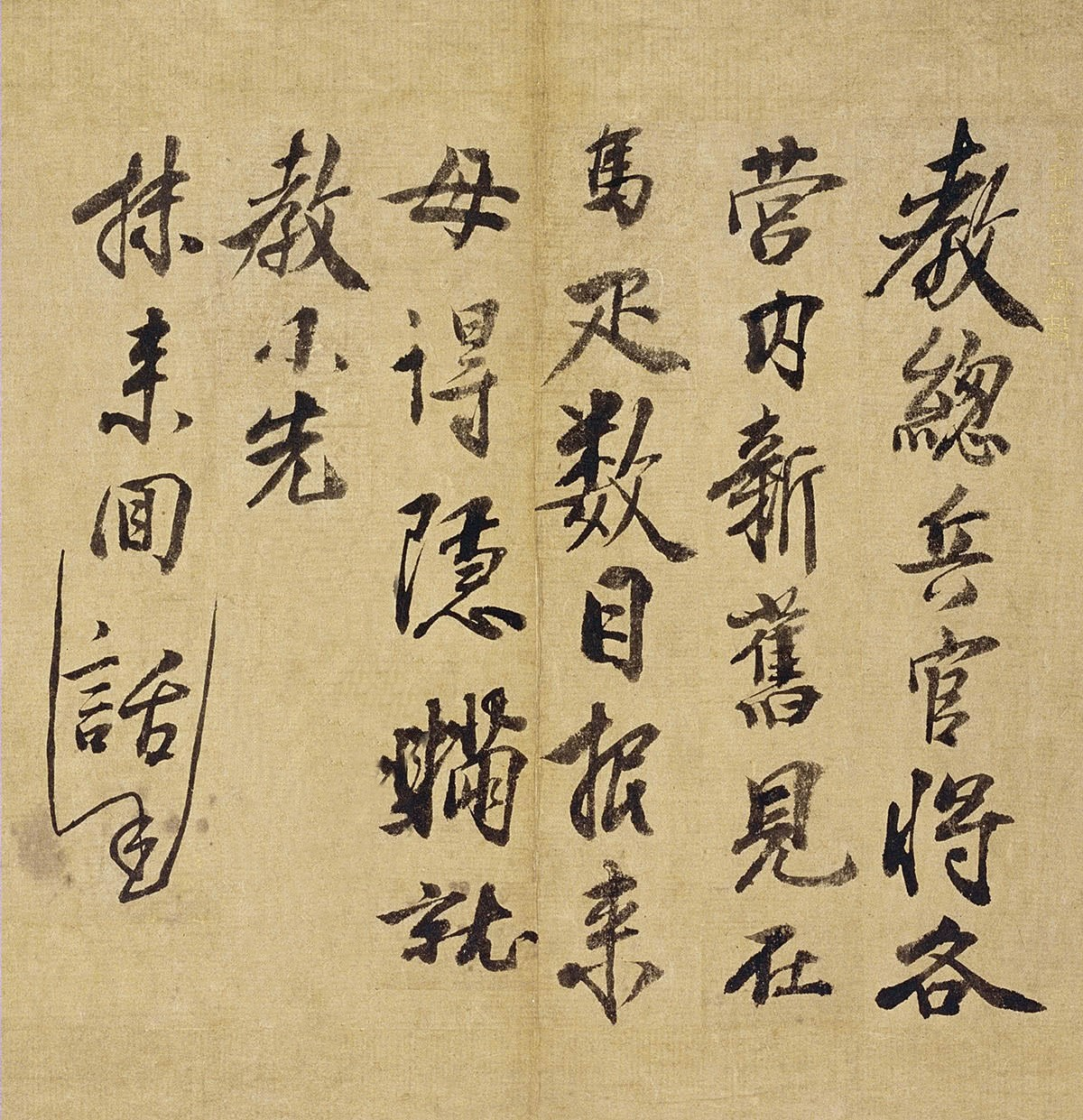
The Hongwu Emperor's calligraphy

The Hongwu Emperor promoted parsimony and simplicity, aiming to restore a basic agricultural economy with other industries in supporting roles. To preserve social cohesion and the state's economic foundations, he restricted the consumption of the wealthy, fearing that displays of luxury would damage society. Rooted in Confucian morality, the privileged were expected to practice self-restraint, and the Emperor himself lived with simple food and furnishings. He regarded comfort, luxury, and property as signs of selfish corruption. His orders included replacing flower gardens in his sons' palaces with vegetable gardens, banning exotic pets in favor of useful animals like cows, and prohibiting rice varieties used for making rice wine. The government also regulated consumption standards for food, clothing, housing, and transportation. These controls extended to everyday life, such as standards for greetings and writing style, restrictions on personal names, and bans on symbols connected to the Emperor's monastic past.

The Emperor believed that providing every man with a field and every woman with a loom would alleviate the people's hardships. During the last years of the Yuan dynasty, land tax revenues had virtually disappeared, as wealthy landowners controlled a disproportionate share of the land and often found ways to avoid paying taxes. The Hongwu Emperor therefore confiscated land from wealthy landowners and redistributed it to the landless. Those who had abandoned their properties during the wars were not entitled to have them returned, but were instead given replacement plots of land on the condition that they personally worked on them. The government punished large landowners and confiscated their land. While Emperor Taizu of Song (r. 960–976) saw the wealthy as the gateway to prosperity for the entire country, the Hongwu Emperor sought to eliminate them. By the end of his reign, very few large landowners remained.

The Hongwu Emperor resettled 14,300 wealthy families from their estates in Zhejiang and the Yingtian area to Nanjing. He also confiscated the vast properties of Buddhist monasteries, which during the Yuan dynasty owned 3/5 of the land in Shandong province. The government abolished roughly 3,000 Buddhist and Taoist monasteries, and limited each county to one monastery with a maximum of two monks. 214,000 Buddhist and 300,000 Taoist monks and nuns returned to secular life. To address the issue of landlessness, the government gave peasants free land; peasants in the north received 15 mu (Note: A traditional Chinese unit of measurement for land area) per field and 2 per garden, and southern peasants received 16 mu. Hereditary soldiers were given 50 mu.

In contrast to the attitude towards the wealthy, care for the poor was significantly increased (and by the 16th century, considered standard). The government ordered the establishment of shelters for beggars in each county, and rations of rice, wood, and cloth were guaranteed for other poor individuals; octogenarians and older individuals were guaranteed meat and wine. The lijia system, which required wealthy families to contribute, covered these expenses.

=== Agriculture ===
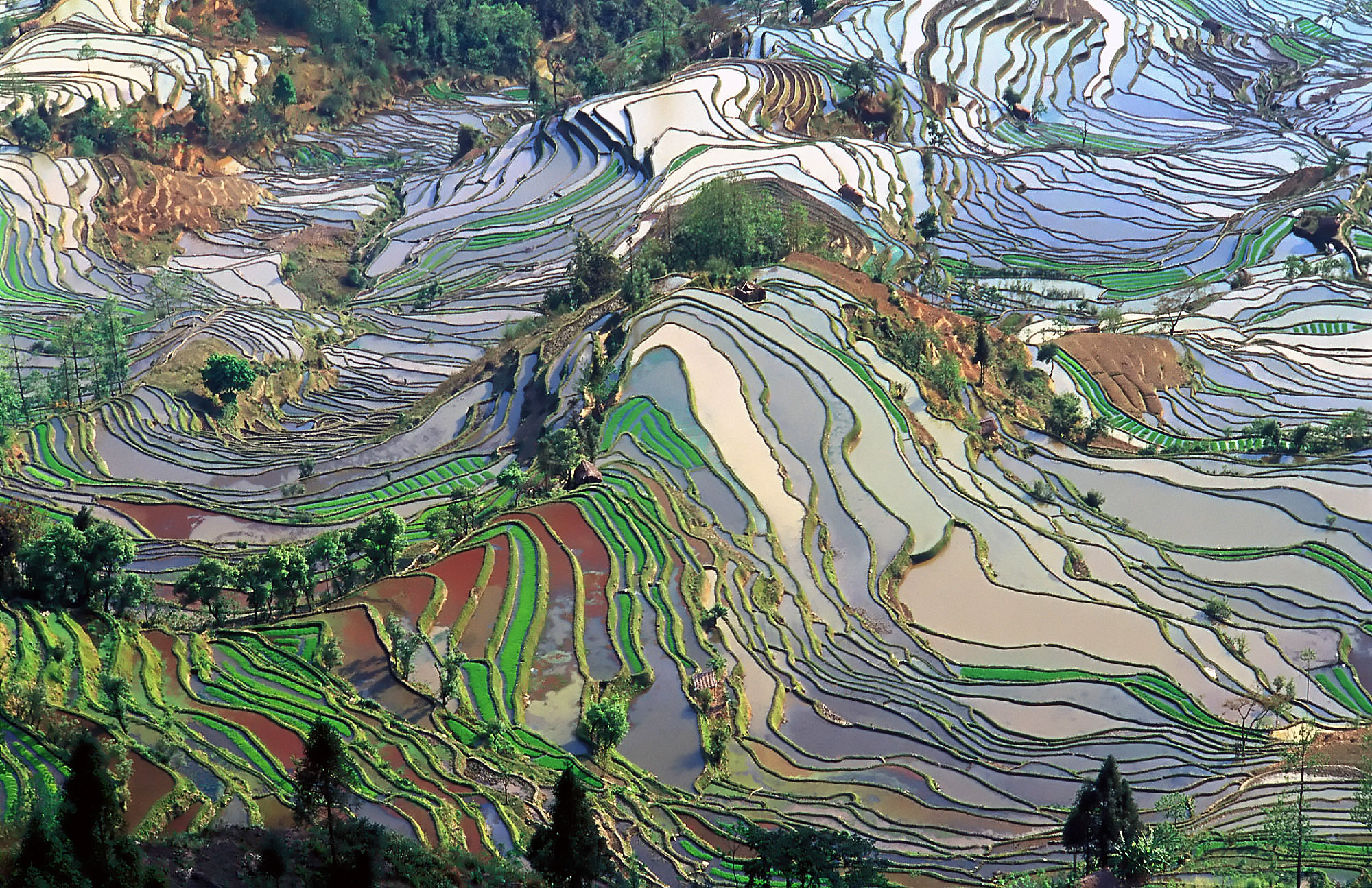
Honghe Hani Rice Terraces in Yunnan. The Hongwu Emperor saw agriculture as the main source of the country's wealth.

Farmers who brought uncultivated land under cultivation were exempt from taxes for three years. The government also encouraged refugees and people from densely populated areas to resettle on vacant land in the north. To increase the labor force, slavery was abolished and the slave trade was banned, the number of monks was reduced, and the buying and selling of free people was prohibited.

As well as reclaiming abandoned land, the government took measures to restore irrigation systems. The Hongwu Emperor ordered local authorities to report any requests or comments from the population regarding the repair or construction of irrigation structures to the court. In 1394, he issued a special decree for the Ministry of Works to maintain canals and dams in case of drought or heavy rains. He also sent graduates from state schools and technical specialists to oversee flood protection structures throughout the country. By the winter of 1395, a total of 40,987 dams and drainage canals had been constructed across the country.

=== Trade ===
The Emperor held a disdainful attitude towards merchants. He viewed weakening the influence of the merchant class and large landowners as a top priority for his government. As part of this effort, he implemented high taxes in and around Suzhou, which was then the commercial and economic hub of China. The government also forcibly relocated thousands of wealthy families to Nanjing and the southern bank of the Yangtze River. To prevent unauthorized business, traveling merchants were required to report their names and cargo to local agents and undergo monthly inspections by the authorities. They were also obligated to store their goods in government warehouses.

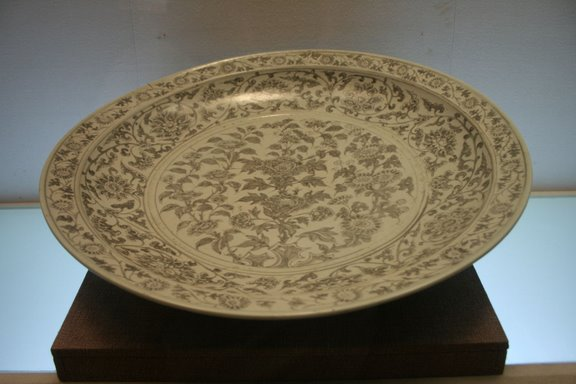
A porcelain dish from the Hongwu era. Nanjing Museum

Restrictions on population mobility greatly affected merchants. Any journeys longer than 100 li (58 km; 36 mi) were strictly prohibited without official permission. To obtain this permission, merchants were required to carry a travel document that contained their personal information such as name, place of residence, name of village head (lizhang; 里長), age, height, occupation, and names of family members. Any discrepancies or irregularities in this document could result in the merchant being sent back home and facing punishment. (Note: A century later, the prominent scholar Zhu Yunming (1461–1527) recalled how his grandfather was sentenced to death after losing his travel documents, but was granted amnesty by the Emperor just minutes before his execution.)

Soldiers inspected merchants along the route, at a ferry terminal, in the street and in their shops. The authorities required inns to provide details about their guests, such as travel destinations and transported goods, while merchants were also required to store their goods in state warehouses and were not allowed to engage in trading without a license. Even when granting merchants a license, authorities would inspect the goods, destination, and price. Intermediaries, or brokers, were strictly prohibited. The government also set fixed prices for most goods, and failure to comply with these prices resulted in punishment. Merchants risked having their goods confiscated and being subjected to flogging for selling poor quality goods.

The Ming dynasty was one of the few dynasties to enforce the system of four occupations (in descending order: officials, peasants, artisans, merchants). Unlike peasants, merchants were excluded from civil service examinations. (Note: For example, among the 110 jinshi in 1400, 83 were from peasant families, 16 were from military families, 6 were from scholarly families; none came from merchant families. Discrimination against merchants persisted for centuries. In 1544, none of the 312 new jinshi came from a merchant family.) This exclusion also extended to rank-and-file employees of the authorities who dealt with financial matters, as they were seen as potential sources of corruption. They were therefore barred from taking the examinations that could elevate them to the official class. Despite the government's efforts, the population's interest in trade remained strong. Contemporary authors attributed this to the fact that a successful trade trip could yield more profit than a year's worth of work in the fields.

=== Foreign relations ===
The Emperor's strict control over the economy and society created major difficulties in foreign relations. Viewing trade as corrupting, the government banned private foreign trade and enforced a strict sea ban during the Hongwu era. The Ming forbade its citizens to leave the empire, and applied harsh punishments such as death or exile to foreigners and anyone trading with them. Shipbuilding with two or more masts was banned, ships and ports were destroyed or blocked, and the coast was heavily guarded. The goal was to stop all foreign trade, summarized in the phrase "not even a piece of wood should sail across the sea". The ban offered no alternatives and caused more smuggling, and government crackdowns were ineffective. The Yongle Emperor later encouraged trade through the tribute system.

Foreign relations played a crucial role in establishing the legitimacy of Ming rule. The surrounding states expressed their recognition of Ming authority and superiority by paying tribute. As part of this tribute system, foreign delegations received Chinese goods of equivalent value from the Ming state. This was a way for the Ming government to regulate and restrict foreign trade.

In 1368, the Emperor announced his accession to Korea, Đại Việt (present-day northern Vietnam), Champa (present-day central and southern Vietnam), and Japan. The following year, Korea, Đại Việt, and Champa sent tribute missions, and in 1370 the Javanese Majapahit did the same. In 1371, Japan, Siam, Cambodia, and the Sumatran Kingdom of Melayu also sent tribute missions, followed by Ryukyu in 1372. From 1369 to 1397, the most frequent missions came from Korea and Ryukyu (20 times each), followed by Champa (19 times), Siam (18 times), and Đại Việt (14 times). Starting in 1370, the government established specialized offices to receive these missions, located in Ningbo, Quanzhou (in Fujian), and Guangzhou. Four years later, these offices were abolished, resulting in a significant decrease in tributary trade. Nonetheless, it remained substantial, the Siamese mission bringing 38 tons of aromatic substances in 1392 and the Javanese mission bringing almost 17 tons of pepper in 1382.

Before embarking on any conquests abroad, the Hongwu Emperor prioritized stabilizing the government in China. He therefore refused to assist Champa in their war against Đại Việt and instead reprimanded the Viets for their aggression. In 1372, after facing defeats in Mongolia, he cautioned future emperors against the pursuit of conquering glory and advised them to focus on defending China against "northern barbarians". The Ming government recognized the Southern Court in Japan as legitimate, while viewing the Kyoto government as usurpers, but they resorted only to harsh correspondence and never to force.

== Changes in the 1380s ==
=== The Emperor's sons ===
The Emperor gave his sons the titles of princes (wang) and assigned them military command on the border to protect the empire. The Emperor's sons received Confucian moral education and also learned about warfare. The Emperor placed great importance on the education of his sons and entrusted it to scholars led by Song Lian and Kong Keren (孔克仁).

The Emperor made the decision to place the princes in charge of the army to diminish the influence of the military nobility on the state. The Emperor was deeply concerned about conspiracies among his generals and had several executed, particularly in connection with the case of Chancellor Hu Weiyong. His fears were not unfounded, as the threat of conspiracies among the generals was always present. He himself came to power through the betrayal of Guo Zixing's heirs and later faced conspiracies from his subordinates. (Note: For example, the rebellion of Shao Rong (邵榮) in 1362.)

The most capable military leaders among the princes were Zhu Di and Zhu Gang, later joined by Zhu Fu, Zhu Zhen, Zhu Zhi, and Zhu Bai. Among the literary-minded imperial princes, Zhu Su stood out for his works on Yuan court poetry and medicinal plants, while Zhu Quan was known for his lyrical dramas and encyclopedias on alchemy and pharmacy. Other princes, such as Zhu Zi, Zhu Tan, Zhu Chun, and Zhu Bai, were also comfortable in the company of scholars and skilled in the art of war. Not all princes behaved, and the Emperor often reprimanded six of his sons–Zhu Shuang, Zhu Su, Zhu Fu, Zhu Zi, Zhu Tan, and Zhu Gui–and his great-nephew Zhu Shouqian.

In 1370, the Emperor appointed nine of his oldest sons (after the heir to the throne) as princes. (Note: At the same time, the Emperor named his great-nephew Zhu Shouqian (1364–1392) the Prince of Jingjiang.) Five more were appointed in 1378, and the remaining ten in 1391. Once they reached around 20 years of age, they were sent to their designated regions, the first being sent in 1378. As they settled into their regions, their importance grew. The most influential of these princes were the second, third, and fourth sons—Zhu Shuang, Zhu Gang, and Zhu Di—who were based in Xi'an, Taiyuan, and Beijing respectively. They were responsible for commanding the armies on the northern frontier. Apart from the princes, other members of the imperial family were excluded from administrating the country.

=== Administrative reforms ===
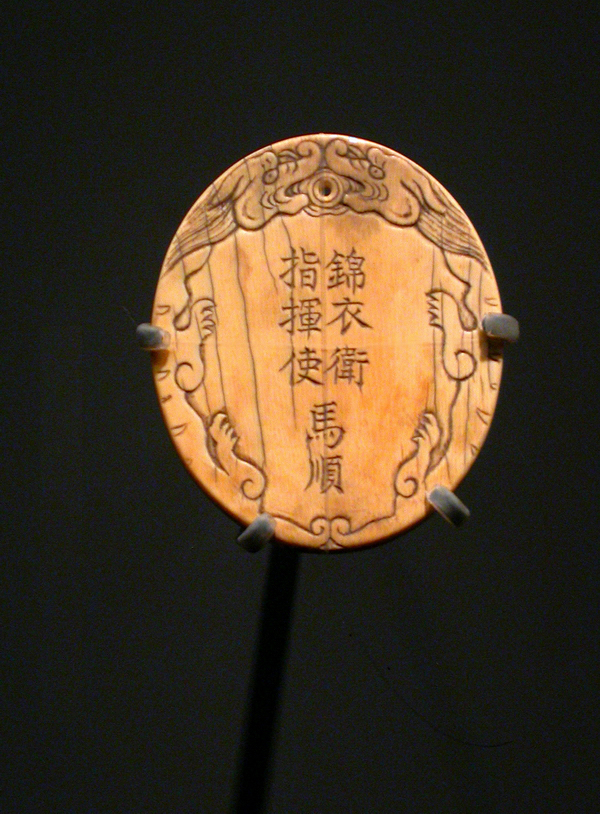
An officer's badge of the Jinyiwei (Embroidered Uniform Guard), an elite guard regiment of the Forbidden City, serving as the secret police. The Capital Museum, Beijing

The structure of the civil administration, organized according to the Yuan model, partially distanced the Emperor from direct exercise of power and did not satisfy him. In the early 1380s, he proceeded with a radical reorganization of the administrative apparatus, with the primary goal of centralization and increasing the ruler's personal power. After Grand Chancellor Hu Weiyong was imprisoned and executed on charges of treason in 1380, the Emperor abolished the office of grand chancellor and the Central Secretariat, permanently forbidding the restoration of the chancellery. The Emperor then placed six ministries directly under his control. He also reorganized the Censorate and divided the unitary Chief Military Commission, which governed the armed forces, into five Chief Military Commissions. Twelve guards of the Imperial Guard in the capital were directly subordinate to the Emperor. One of these guards, known as the Embroidered Uniform Guard, acted as the secret police. This resulted in the fragmentation of state authority, which immediately eliminated the possibility of a coup d'état but weakened the government's long-term ability to act.

After the major purge of 1380, smaller purges followed targeting several ministers, the Emperor's nephew Li Wenzhong, and hundreds of less prominent individuals. The executions sparked a wave of protests from officials, who pointed to the demoralization of the state apparatus and the waste of human resources. The Emperor did not punish the critics, but he also did not change his policies.

=== Domestic and foreign policy ===
In 1381, the government implemented the lijia throughout the country and introduced the Yellow Registers to revise the population records. A census was conducted. (Note: During the census of 1381, a total of 59,873,305 people were counted, but due to the fact that the census was primarily used to determine tax obligations, many citizens deliberately avoided being counted. Only 56,774,561 people were officially recorded in 1391. The government, believing that the population must have increased during the ten years of peace and prosperity, ordered a recount in 1393. This time, the result was 60,545,812, though the actual population was likely closer to 75 million.) As part of this system, tax collection was transferred to the li, resulting in the abolition of regional tax captains in 1382, but they were reinstated three years later. Regional tax captains collected taxes from the heads of the li and delivered them to state granaries. The li were responsible for covering expenses related to transportation, accounting, and supervision.

The campaign against large landowners also targeted the new Ming officials. The government reviewed land ownership of ministers and officials in 1380, and that of nobles and imperial princes in 1381. These individuals were required to return their acquired lands to the state and were compensated with rice and silk. This resulted in a long-lasting fragmentation of land ownership. Even two centuries later, He Liangjun (何良俊; 1506–1573) observed that there were no large landowners in Suzhou, and no one owned more than ten times the amount of land as a small peasant.

In 1382, the Emperor suffered a significant loss when Empress Ma died. That same year, the newly appointed head of the Court of Judicature and Revision criticized the Emperor's support of Buddhist monks, their privileges at court, and their position in the government. The Emperor subsequently limited their influence. At the same time, there was growing support for Confucianism, leading to the opening of Confucian temples throughout the empire. The government had closed all but one of these temples in 1369. This shift towards Confucianism also resulted in the renewal of civil service examinations in 1384, which only required knowledge of the Four Books and Five Classics. The promotion of Confucianism strengthened the emphasis on moral considerations, rather than just economic factors, in the management of the state.

The 1380s saw a significant increase in foreign policy activity. In 1380 and 1381, the northern border troops launched large-scale expeditions beyond the Great Wall. In 1381, the Ming army, led by Fu Youde, quickly conquered Yunnan, but spent several more years suppressing local uprisings. A significant number of troops were also needed to guard the coast against smugglers and pirates, delaying the offensive in the north until 1387. The campaign into Manchuria in 1387 was ultimately successful, but the commanding general, Feng Sheng, was replaced by Lan Yu. In the 1388 campaign, Lan Yu's army of 200,000 decisively defeated the Mongols at the Songhua River and Buir Lake. The Chinese captured 73,000 Mongol warriors, including the khan Tögüs Temür's two sons. Tögüs Temür fled, but was assassinated the following year, leading his people to dispute the succession. As a reward, the Emperor granted Lan the title of duke and made six generals marquises. The campaign also resulted in the annexation of the Liaodong Peninsula.

== 1390s: Succession crisis and death ==
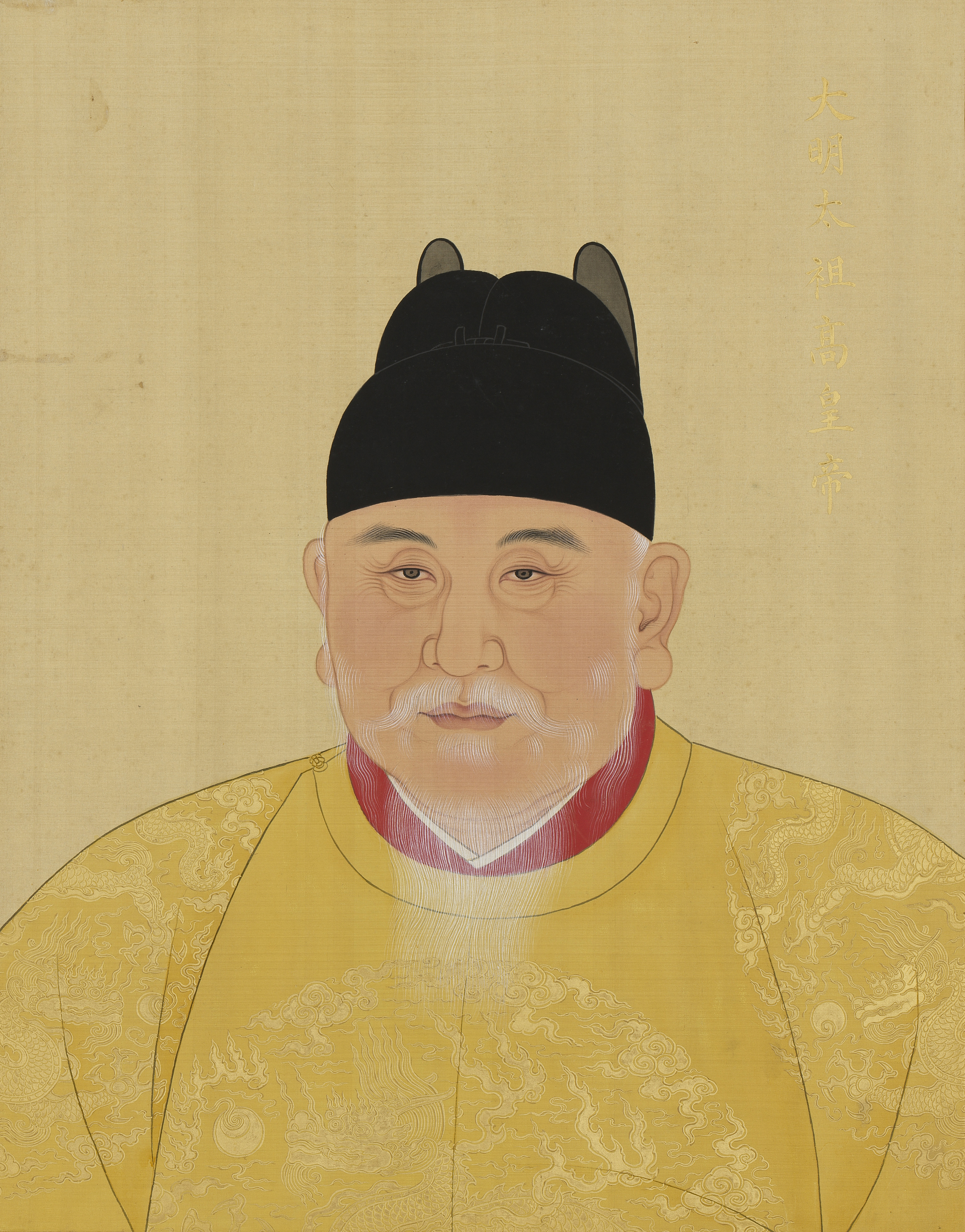
The Hongwu Emperor in his old age, c. 1397

From 1390 onwards, the Emperor's sons commanded the armies sent north of the Great Wall. A new wave of arrests also began in the early 1390s. In the autumn of 1391, the Emperor's heir, Zhu Biao, inspected Shaanxi to assess the possibility of relocating the capital to Xi'an. He fell ill on his return and died in 1392, creating uncertainty over the imperial succession. The Emperor appointed Zhu Biao's son, Zhu Yunwen, as the new heir. To ensure a smooth transition of power to the young heir, the Emperor initiated a massive new wave of purges in 1393, starting with the accusation and execution of Lan Yu. He hoped these purges would dismantle the military nobility.

During the Hongwu Emperor's 30-year rule, approximately 100,000 people were killed in political purges. The most notable of these purges occurred in 1390, when arrests and executions extended to the entire ruling class. It seems that the Emperor realized that the military hereditary elite was not a reliable source of support for the throne and made the decision to eliminate them. In an attempt to address the issue of extreme wealth disparities, many landowners and merchants were unjustly executed under the false accusation of being associated with treacherous politicians.

Rather than civil officials, the Emperor's sons filled the power vacuum left by the purges. Like generals before them, they alternated between serving on the border and holding audiences in the capital. This helped to stabilize the empire during the Hongwu Emperor's lifetime, but after his death, a crisis arose due to the loyalty of the generals and officials being directed towards the emperor as an individual rather than the office.

The Hongwu Emperor fell seriously ill in December 1397 and again on 24 May 1398. On 22 June, his condition worsened, and he died on 24 June 1398. He was buried in the Xiao Mausoleum, located on the southern side of Purple Mountain, east of Nanjing.

Zhu Yunwen ascended the throne as the Jianwen Emperor on 30 June 1398. He then implemented the policy of "reducing the feudatories" (削藩; xuefan) to limit the authority of his uncles. This policy led to the rebellion of his uncle Zhu Di in the autumn of 1399. The ensuing civil war, known as the Jingnan campaign, ended in 1402 with the defeat of the Jianwen Emperor and Zhu Di's ascension to the throne as the Yongle Emperor.

== Assessment ==
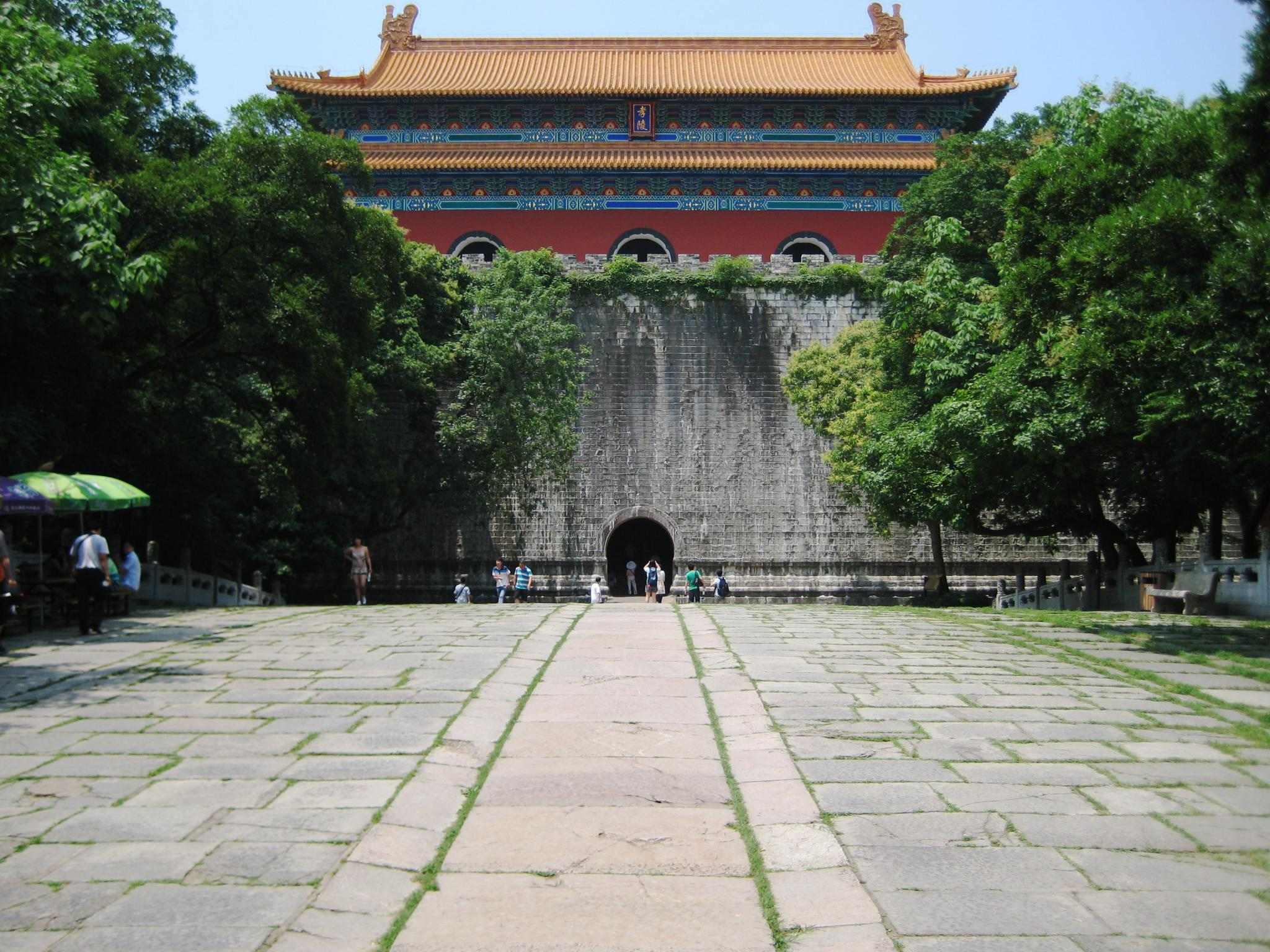
The restored Xiao Mausoleum, 2010

In traditional Chinese historiography, the Hongwu Emperor was revered as a typical founder of a dynasty. He is credited with bringing China out of civil war and freeing it from foreign rule. His unification of the country and restoration of order in society laid the groundwork for a prosperous era under the new dynasty. In keeping with this assessment, his ministers gave him the temple name Taizu, meaning 'Grand Progenitor'. This perspective was reflected in the official history of the Ming dynasty, known as the History of Ming, which was written during the Qing dynasty.

Modern historians, influenced by a strong aversion towards the dictators of the 20th century, an anti-monarchist mindset, and a tendency to psychoanalyze personalities, often place a heavy emphasis on the despotic nature of the Hongwu Emperor's regime and attribute it to paranoia, or more generally, to some form of mental illness. They primarily view him as a dictator whose irrational actions and paranoia resulted in the loss of countless lives. Other approaches examine him within the context of his time and personal experiences. This perspective highlights the impact of his life experiences on his goals and the methods he employed to achieve them. His impoverished and unstable upbringing is considered a crucial period in which he developed his personal philosophy.

The Hongwu Emperor is widely regarded as one of the most influential and remarkable rulers in Chinese history, regardless of which aspect of his life is emphasized. His reforms had a lasting impact on the Chinese state and society for centuries to come. To establish a well-ordered and virtuous society, he adopted Zhu Xi's version of Neo-Confucianism as the state ideology, which greatly contributed to its widespread adoption.

The abolition of the Grand Secretariat and the reform of central administrative bodies resulted in the loss of strong representation for officials. This led to a significant increase in the ruler's power and marked a departure from the Song and Yuan empires, where the emperor's authority was limited. Instead, it established a more despotic rule that continued through the Qing dynasty. The Ming dynasty saw the culmination of a long trend toward political unification under strong imperial rule, a form of rule first realized in the Qin and Han dynasties.

Although the political superstructure created by the Hongwu Emperor collapsed in a civil war shortly after his death, the administrative institutions established during his reign—including the central and local government, provincial administration, and the fiscal and examination systems—proved remarkably durable, surviving with only minor modifications until the end of imperial China. The census, land registration and tax system, and the Weisuo military system all endured until the end of the dynasty.

== Family ==
=== Consorts and issue ===
- Empress Xiaocigao of the Ma clan
  - Zhu Biao, Crown Prince Yiwen (1355–1392), first son
  - Zhu Shuang, Prince Min of Qin (1356–1395), second son
  - Zhu Gang, Prince Gong of Jin (1358–1398), third son
  - Zhu Di, Prince of Yan, later the Yongle Emperor (1360–1424), fourth son
  - Zhu Su, Prince Ding of Zhou (1361–1425), fifth son
  - Princess Ningguo (1364–1434), second daughter. Married in 1378 to Mei Yin (d. 1405), nephew of Mei Sizu, Marquis of Runan.
  - Princess Anqing, fourth daughter. Married in 1381 to Ouyang Lun (歐陽倫; d. 1397).
- Noble Consort Chengmu of the Sun clan (1342–1374)
  - Princess Lin'an (d. 1421), personal name Jingjing (鏡靜), first daughter. Married in 1376 to Li Qi (李祺; d. 1403), the eldest son of Li Shanchang, Duke of Han.
  - Princess Huaiqing, sixth daughter. Married in 1382 to Wang Ning (王寧), Marquis of Yongchun (永春侯).
  - Tenth daughter
  - Thirteenth daughter
- Noble Consort (貴妃) of the Yong clan (永氏)
- Noble Consort (貴妃) of the Wang clan (汪氏)
- Noble Consort (貴妃) of the Zhao clan (趙氏)
  - Zhu Mo, Prince Jian of Shen (1380–1431), 21st son
- Consort Shu (淑妃) of the Li clan (李氏)
- Consort Ning (寧妃) of the Guo clan (郭氏)
  - Princess Runing (汝寧公主), fifth daughter. Married in 1382 to Lu Xian (陸賢), son of Lu Zhongheng, Marquis of Ji'an.
  - Princess Daming (大名公主; d. 1426), seventh daughter. Married in 1382 to Li Jian (李堅; d. 1401).
  - Zhu Tan (朱檀), Prince Huang of Lu (魯荒王; 1370–1390), tenth son
- Consort Zhaojingchong (昭敬充妃) of the Hu clan (胡氏)
  - Zhu Zhen, Prince Zhao of Chu (1364–1424), sixth son
- Consort Ding (定妃) of the Da clan (達氏; d. 1390)
  - Zhu Fu, Prince Gong of Qi (1364–1428), seventh son
  - Zhu Zi (朱梓), Prince of Tan (潭王; 1369–1390), eighth son
- Consort An (安妃) of the Zheng clan (鄭氏)
  - Princess Fuqing (福清公主; d. 1417), eighth daughter. Married in 1385 to Zhang Lin (張麟), son of Zhang Long, Marquis of Fengxiang.
- Consort Hui (惠妃) of the Guo clan (郭氏)
  - Zhu Chun (朱椿), Prince Xian of Shu (蜀獻王); 1371–1423), 11th son
  - Zhu Gui, Prince Jian of Dai (1374–1446), 13th son
  - Princess Zhenyi of Yongjia (永嘉貞懿公主; 1376–1455), 12th daughter. Married in 1389 to Guo Zhen (郭鎮), son of Guo Ying, Marquis of Wuding.
  - Zhu Hui (朱橞), Prince of Gu (谷王; 1379–1428), 19th son
  - Princess Ruyang (汝陽公主), 15th daughter. Married in 1394 to Xie Da (謝達).
- Consort Shun (順妃) of the Hu clan (胡氏)
  - Zhu Bai (朱柏), Prince Xian of Xiang (湘獻王; 1371–1399), 12th son
- Consort Xian (賢妃) of the Li clan (李氏)
  - Zhu Jing, Prince Ding of Tang (唐定王 朱桱; 1386–1415), 23rd son
- Consort Hui (惠妃) of the Liu clan (劉氏)
  - Zhu Dong (朱棟), Prince Jing of Ying (郢靖王; 1388–1414), 24th son
- Consort Li (麗妃) of the Ge clan (葛氏)
  - Zhu Yi (朱㰘), Prince Li of Yi (伊厲王; 1388–1414), 25th son
  - Zhu Nan (朱楠; 1394–1394), 26th son
- Consort Zhuangjinganronghui (莊靖安榮惠妃) of the Cui clan (崔氏)
- Consort (妃) of the Han clan (韓氏)
  - Zhu Zhi, Prince Jian of Liao (1377–1424), 15th son
  - Princess Hanshan (含山公主; 1381–1462), 14th daughter. Married in 1394 to Yin Qing (尹清).
- Consort (妃) of the Yu clan (余氏)
  - Zhu Zhan (朱㮵), Prince Jing of Qing (慶靖王; 1378–1438), 16th son
- Consort (妃) of the Yang clan (楊氏)
  - Zhu Quan, Prince Xian of Ning (1378–1448), 17th son
- Consort (妃) of the Zhou clan (周氏)
  - Zhu Pian (朱楩), Prince Zhuang of Min (岷莊王; 1379–1450), 18th son
  - Zhu Song (朱松), Prince Xian of Han (韓憲王; 1380–1407), 20th son
- Consort (妃) of the Weng clan (翁氏; d. 1398)
- Beauty (美人) of the Zhang clan (張氏), personal name Xuanmiao (玄妙)
  - Princess Baoqing (寶慶公主; 1395–1433), 16th daughter. Married in 1413 to Zhao Hui (趙輝).
- Beauty (美人) of the Qu clan (屈氏)
- Lady Gao (郜氏)
  - Zhu Yang (朱楧), Prince Zhuang of Su (肅莊王; 1376–1420), 14th son
- Unknown
  - Princess Chongning, third daughter. Married in 1384 to Niu Cheng (牛城).
  - Zhu Qi (朱杞), Prince of Zhao (趙王; 1369–1371), ninth son
  - Princess Shouchun (壽春公主; d. 1388), ninth daughter. Married in 1386 to Fu Zhong (傅忠), son of Fu Youde, Duke of Ying.
  - Princess Nankang (南康公主; d. 1438), personal name Yuhua (玉華), 11th daughter. Married in 1388 to Hu Guan (胡觀), son of Hu Hai, Marquis of Dongchuan.
  - Zhu Ying (朱楹), Prince Hui of An (安惠王; 1383–1417), 22nd son

=== Ancestry ===
Ancestors of Hongwu Emperor

16. Zhu Bailiu
8. Zhu Sijiu
17. Lady Hu
4. Zhu Chuyi
9. Lady Hou
2. Zhu Shizhen
5. Lady Wang
1. Hongwu Emperor
6. Lord Chen
3. Lady Chen

== See also ==
- Chinese emperors family tree (late)
- Huang-Ming Zuxun, the "Ancestral Instructions" written by the Hongwu Emperor to guide his descendants
- Mandate of Heaven
- Ming–Tibet relations
- Ming dynasty in Inner Asia

== Notes ==
Hongwu Emperor House of Zhu Born: 21 October 1328 Died: 24 June 1398
Regnal titles
New title Ming dynasty established	Emperor of the Ming dynasty 23 January 1368 – 24 June 1398	Succeeded by Jianwen Emperor
Preceded by Ukhaghatu Khan Toghon Temür (Yuan dynasty)	Emperor of China; 23 January 1368 – 24 June 1398	Succeeded by Jianwen Emperor
Chinese royalty
Unknown	King of Wu; 1364–1368	Merged into the Crown
