= Princess Anqing =

Chinese princess (14th century)

Princess Anqing 安慶公主
- Spouse: Ouyang Lun
- Father: Hongwu Emperor
- Mother: Empress Ma

Chinese name
- Traditional Chinese: 安慶公主
- Simplified Chinese: 安庆公主
Transcriptions
Standard Mandarin
- Hanyu Pinyin: Ānqìng Gōngzhǔ

Princess Anqing, personal name unknown, was a princess of the Ming dynasty. She was the fourth daughter of Hongwu Emperor and his second by Empress Ma. In 1381, Princess Anqing was married to Ouyang Lun. By 1397, Ouyang Lun was executed after being implicated in a tea-horse smuggling scandal. Thereafter, no verifiable records exist regarding the princess's life following this event, nor is there any documented evidence of whether she bore any children during their sixteen-year marriage.

== Biography ==
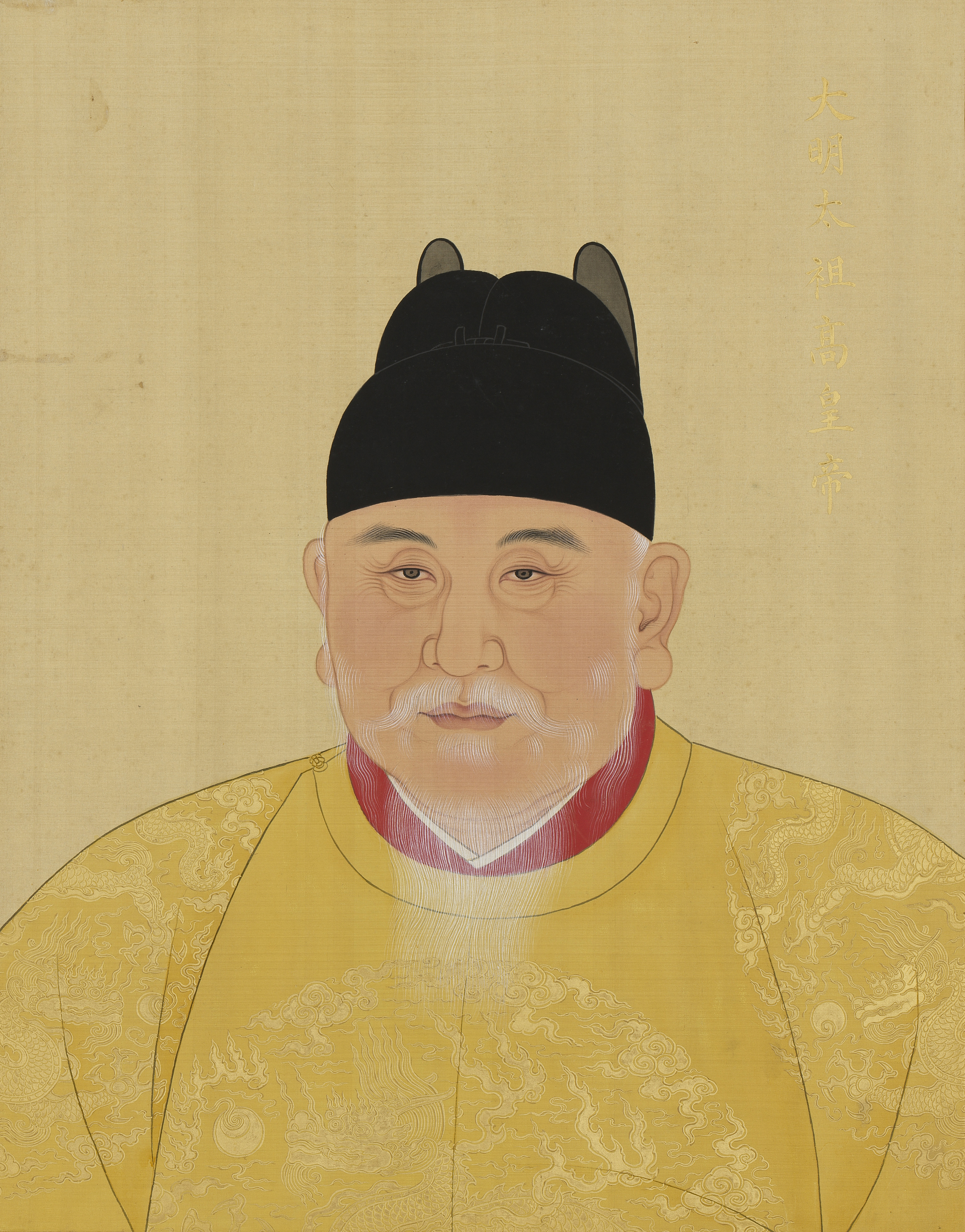
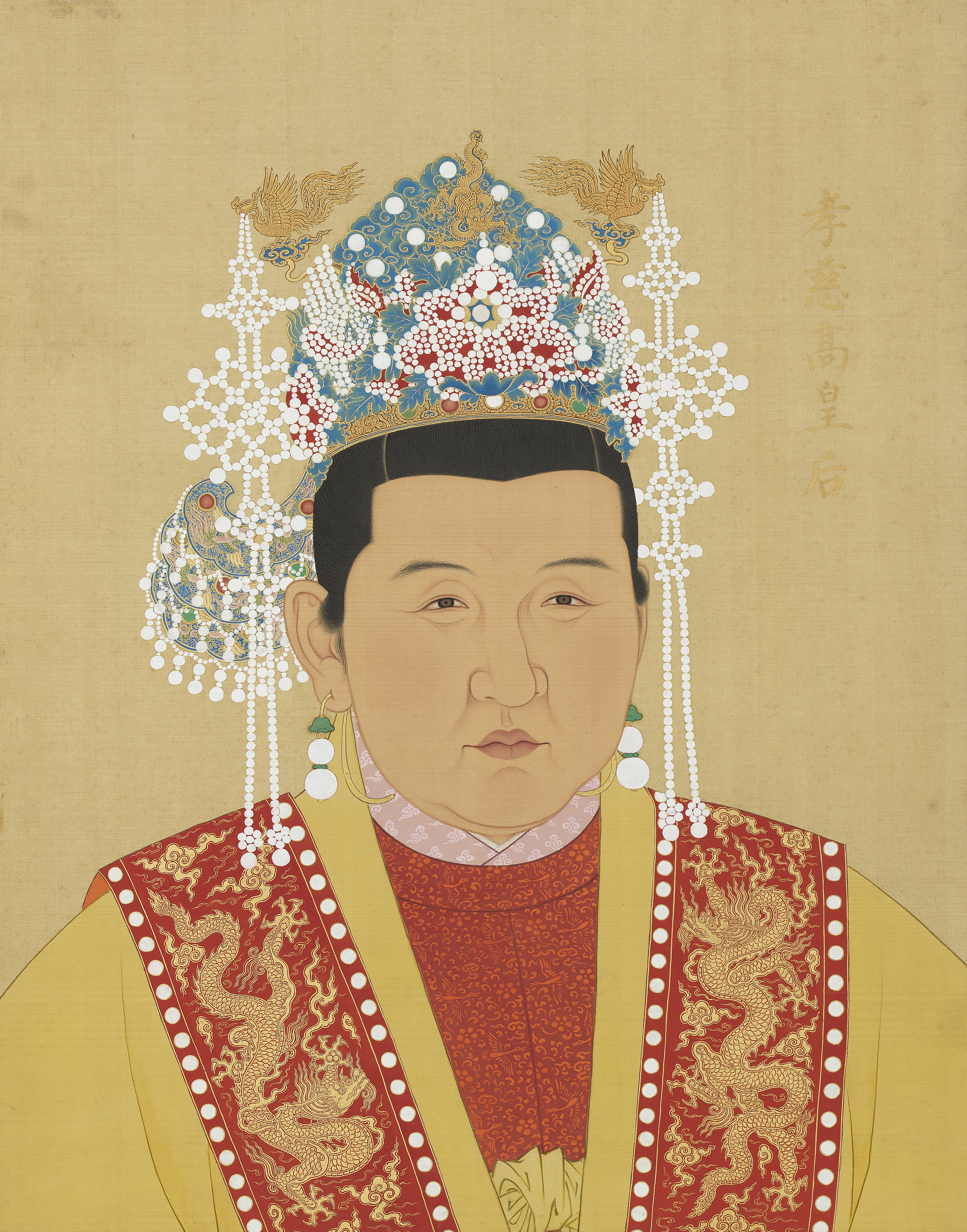
Anqing's parents

Princess Anqing was the full younger sister of Princess Ningguo. Based on the recorded birth years of Princess Ningguo (1364) and Princess Huaiqing (1367), the sixth daughter of the Hongwu Emperor, Princess Anqing must have been born between 1365 and 1367. In the early years of the Hongwu Emperor's reign, the consorts of imperial princes and princesses were almost exclusively drawn from the families of founding meritorious officials. Princess Anqing, however, broke with this precedent when, on 23 December 1381, she was married to Ouyang Lun, a man of common birth. She thus became the first princess of the Hongwu era to wed a husband outside the ranks of the nobility.

Ouyang was infamous for his corrupt conduct. During the late Hongwu period, despite stringent restrictions on the tea trade, he repeatedly dispatched private agents to smuggle tea in Shaanxi and Sichuan, creating widespread disorder. His household servant Zhou Bao, notorious for his violent temperament, often abused his master's name to oppress the local populace. Zhou frequently commandeered carts to seize goods by force, and at one point assaulted government inspectors at a river bridge checkpoint in Lanzhou. The wounded officials reported the incident to higher authorities, provoking the wrath of the Hongwu Emperor.

On 23 July 1397, the Emperor ordered Ouyang to be executed and commanded the death of Zhou Bao and his accomplices as well. Ouyang remains the only consort of a Ming princess to have been formally sentenced to death under state law.
