= Prince of Qi (Ming dynasty) =

Princedom of Qi 齊王
- Creation date: 1370 (1st creation); 1403 (2nd creation)
- Created by: Hongwu Emperor
- Peerage: 1st-rank princely peerage for imperial son of the Ming dynasty
- First holder: Zhu Fu, Prince Gong
- Last holder: same as above (the last known head was Zhu Zhisheng)
- Status: Extinct
- Extinction date: 1399 (1st creation); 1406 (2nd creation)
- Seats: Zhangdefu (彰德府) (in the borders of Henan and Hebei)

Prince of Qi (Chinese: 齊王) was a first-rank princely peerage of the Ming dynasty created by the Hongwu Emperor. The first Prince of Qi was Zhu Fu, 7th son of the Hongwu Emperor. He was made the principality by his father in 1370. The peerage later abolished by the Jianwen Emperor in 1399, and abolished again by the Yongle Emperor in 1406 after the re-creation of 1403. After Zhu Yujian enthroned as the Longwu Emperor of the Southern Ming, he posthumously restored Zhu Fu's princely title and princedom. The Chongzhen Emperor also posthumously bestowed 3rd son of his father, the Taichang Emperor, Zhu Youji (朱由楫) under the title of Prince of Qi.

This peerage has three cadet commandery prince lines.

== Generation name / poem ==
The generation poem given by the Hongwu Emperor was:

"Xian Neng Chang Ke Qing, Rui Zhi Shi Kan Zong. Yang Xing Qi Yuan Ya, Yin Si Fu Hui Tong"
賢能長可慶，睿智實堪宗。養性期淵雅，寅思復會通

== Members of Prince of Qi ==
The peerage of "Prince of Qi" (齊王) was created in 1370, continued to 1406. The fief of this peerage was located at Qingzhou (青州府).

- Zhu Fu (朱榑; 23 Dec 1364 - 1428), the Hongwu Emperor's 7th son. He was made Prince of Qi by his father in 1370 and took his fief located in Qingzhou in 1382. He was then stripped of his title by the Jianwen Emperor in 1399 and imprisoned with his 5th brother, Zhu Shu, Prince Ding of Zhou. His title was restored in 1403 by his 4th brother, the Yongle Emperor. He was detained in 1406 at the capital and demoted again with his sons. In 1646, the Longwu Emperor restored his title with full posthumous name: Prince Gong of Qi (齊恭王)
  - Zhu Xianting (朱賢烶; 16 Oct 1384 - 1428), Zhu Fu's eldest son. He was made a second-rank prince under the title Prince of Le'an Commandery in 1402 but stripped in 1406 with his father and detained in Nanjing until his death. His full posthumous name was Prince Daoyin of Le'an (樂安悼隱王)
  - Zhu Xianling (朱賢𤊥; 30 Jan 1386 - 15 Feb 1413), Zhu Fu's second son. He was made a second-rank prince under the title Prince of Changshan Commandery in 1402, then stripped of his title in 1406 and detained with his father until his death. His full posthumous name was Prince Minshun of Changshan (長山敏順王)
  - Zhu Xian'an (朱賢𭴣; died 1428), Zhu Fu's third son. He was made a second-rank prince under the title Prince of Pingyuan Commandery (平原郡王) in 1402, then stripped of his title in 1406 and detained his father until his death.
  - Zhu Xianhe (朱賢爀), Zhu Fu's fourth son. He was too young to be made a prince when his father was demoted.
  - N/A
    - Zhu Changchan (朱長毚), a great-grandson of Zhu Fu. He was released in 1534.
    - Zhu Chengcai (朱承彩), a descendant of Zhu Fu who lived during the Wanli Emperor's reign.
    - Zhu Zhisheng (朱智墭), a 7th generation descendant of Zhu Fu. He was the head of Zhu Fu's descendants during the Hongguang Emperor's reign. He used to have invited to succeed his forefathers' peerage but he was rejected.
