= Ming dynasty in Inner Asia =

Power and influence in Inner Asia

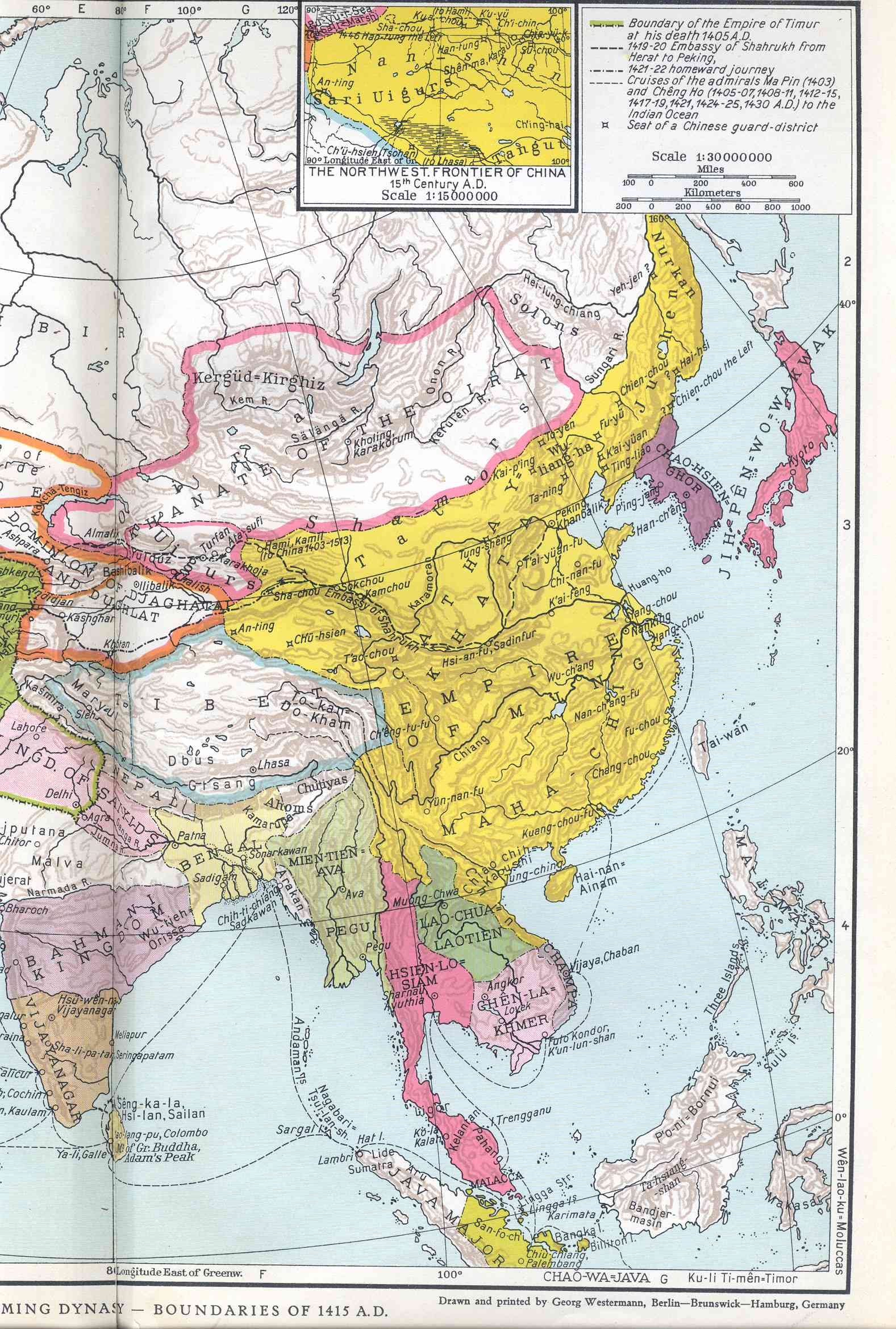
Ming China in 1415 during the reign of the Yongle Emperor

The Ming dynasty in Inner Asia was the expansion of the Ming dynasty's realm and influence in Inner Asia between the 14th and the 16th centuries. The Ming dynasty overthrew and succeeded the Mongol-led Yuan dynasty and sought to avert further incursions by a regime originating from Inner Asia. Wars were fought against the Northern Yuan, which existed as a rump state after the collapse of the Yuan dynasty in 1368, but also against other states in Inner Asia including the Oirat Confederation and Moghulistan (and later its successor state, the Turpan Khanate). As a result, Ming China at the height incorporated Manchuria (Northeast China and Outer Manchuria), much of the regions of Inner Mongolia and Qinghai, and parts of Xinjiang into its realm, and also had some degree of influence in Tibet especially during the reign of the Yongle Emperor.

The early Ming emperors from the Hongwu Emperor to the Zhengde Emperor continued Yuan practices such as hereditary military institutions, demanding Korean and Muslim concubines and eunuchs, having Mongols serve in the Ming military, patronizing Tibetan Buddhism, with the early Ming emperors seeking to project themselves as "universal rulers" to various peoples such as Central Asian Muslims, Tibetans, and Mongols. The Yongle Emperor cited Emperor Taizong of Tang as a model for being familiar with both China and the steppe people. With the exceptions of the Jiajing Emperor and Chongzhen Emperor, all emperors of the Ming dynasty were actually enthusiastic about the practice and propagation of Tibetan Buddhism. Inspired by New Qing History studies, the so-called "New Ming History" studies have also emerged, which similarly attempts to draw attention to the Inner Asian characteristics of the Ming dynasty.

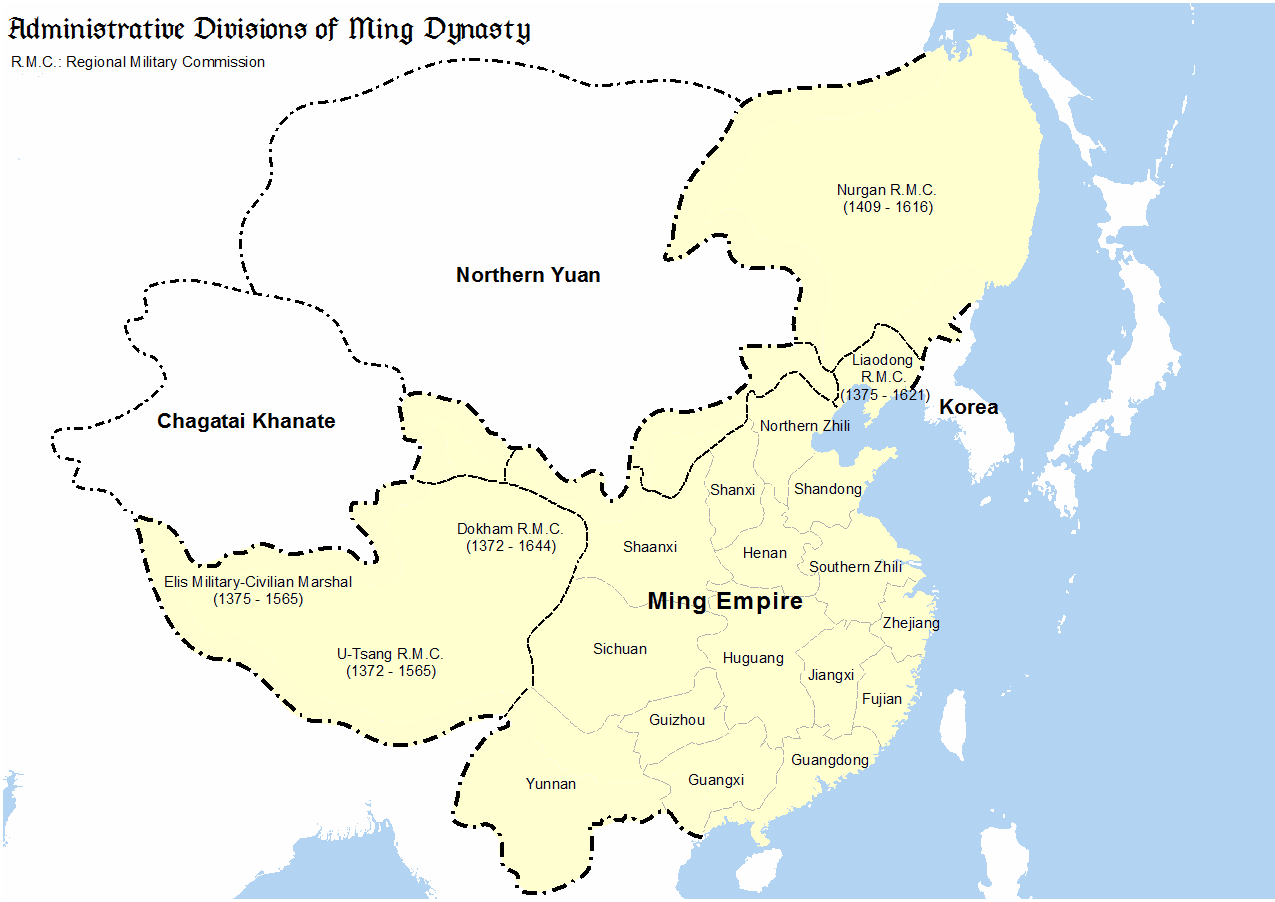
Administrative divisions of the Ming dynasty in 1409; note that the exact nature of the Ming–Tibet relations is disputed

== Manchuria ==
Manchuria (present-day Northeast China and Outer Manchuria) was ruled by the Mongol-led Yuan dynasty under the Liaoyang province. The Ming dynasty's rule of Manchuria began with its conquest of Manchuria in the late 1380s after the fall of the Yuan dynasty in 1368. The military expedition of the Ming army led by General Feng Sheng against the Uriankhai horde of the Mongol chieftain Naghachu in Manchuria, which was still controlled by the Northern Yuan at that time, concluded with the surrender of the Uriankhai to the Ming which then controlled Manchuria.

Ming control of Manchuria reached its peak in the early 15th century with the establishment of the Nurgan Regional Military Commission, which was however dissolved in 1435. The Ming dynasty then adopted a political strategy of divide and rule for different Jurchen tribes. The Ming categorized the Jurchens into three groups, the Jianzhou Jurchens, the Haixi Jurchens, and the Wild Jurchens. Starting in the 1580s, the Jianzhou Jurchen chieftain Nurhaci, who was originally a Ming vassal and considered himself a local representative of imperial Ming power, began to take control of most of Manchuria over the next several decades, and in 1616 he established the Later Jin and renounced Ming overlordship with the Seven Grievances. The Qing dynasty established by his son Hong Taiji would eventually conquer the Ming and take control of China proper.

== Inner Mongolia ==
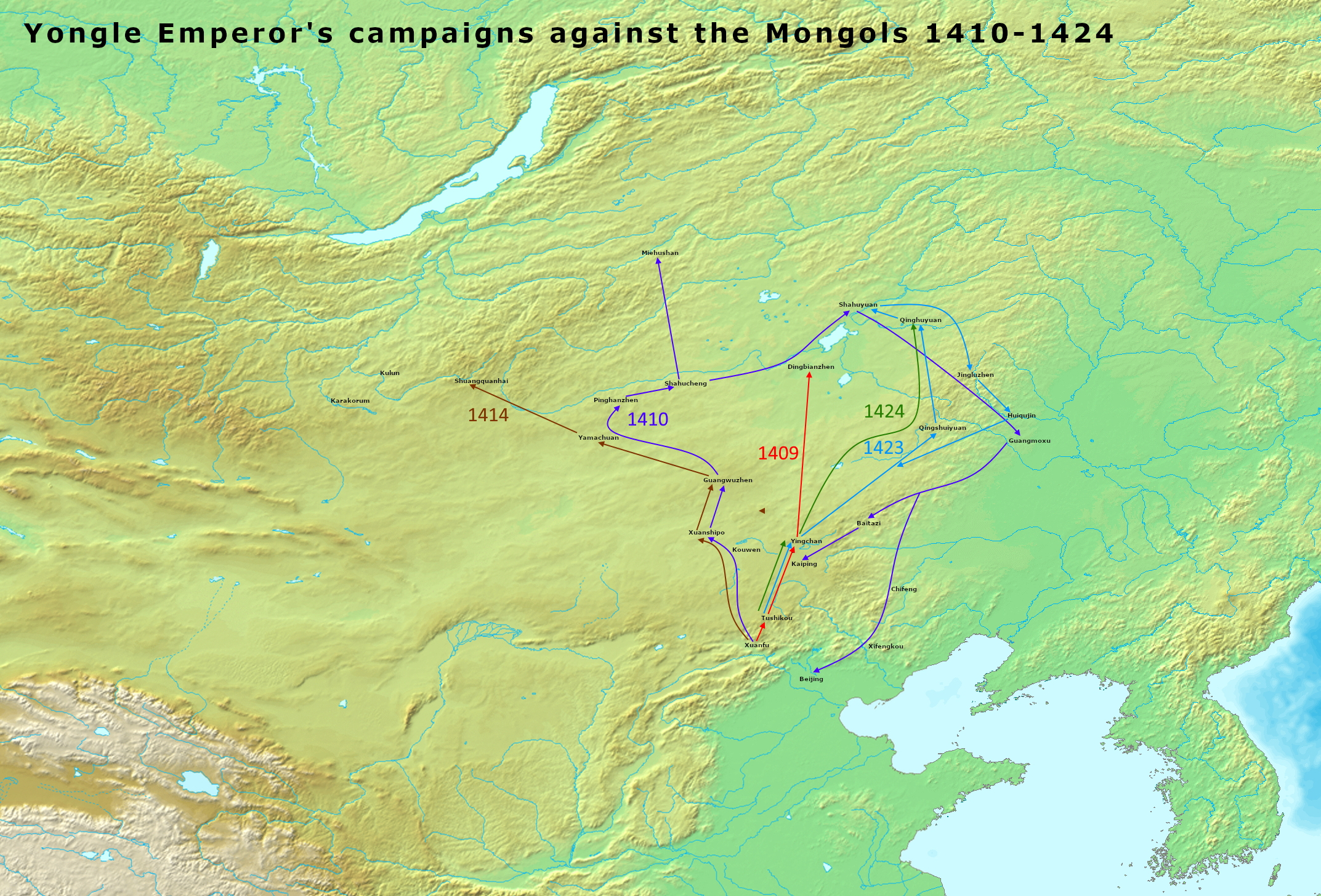
Yongle Emperor's campaigns against the Mongols (1410–1424)

The region known as Inner Mongolia was controlled by the Mongol Yuan dynasty, with Shangdu located in Inner Mongolia as its summer capital. After the fall of the Yuan dynasty in 1368, the Ming dynasty captured large parts of Inner Mongolia including Shangdu and Yingchang, forcing the Yuan remnants to retreat to Karakorum in Mongolia, known as the Northern Yuan. The victory of the Ming armies led to the military dominance of the early Ming dynasty in much of Inner Mongolia. Ming China established the Three Guards around the Great Wall of China. The Yongle Emperor launched several aggressive campaigns against the Mongols, defeating the Northern Yuan, Eastern Mongols, Oirats, and various other Mongol tribes. However, shortly after the Tumu incident in 1449, when the Oirat ruler Esen taishi defeated the Ming forces and captured the Emperor Yingzong of Ming, Mongols reconquered most of Inner Mongolia from the Ming, until they submitted to the Manchu-led Qing dynasty.

== Qinghai ==
The region known as Qinghai was controlled by the Mongol Yuan dynasty under the Bureau of Buddhist and Tibetan Affairs (Xuanzheng Yuan). After the fall of the Yuan dynasty in 1368, the armies of the early Ming dynasty arrived in what is now northeastern Qinghai province including the regions around the Qinghai Lake in the early 1370s, establishing the Xining Guard (Chinese: 西寧衛) stationed at Xining in 1373 under the "Shaanxi Capital Command and Envoy Department" (Chinese: 陝西都指揮使司) as part of its military system. In 1377 Ming generals Mu Ying and Lan Yu were given command of a punitive expedition to punish a Tibetan chieftain who had refused to recognize Ming rule. This expedition marched deep into modern Qinghai, as far west as the Kunlun Mountains. The Ming dynasty at its height once controlled large parts of Qinghai, but the territory was later gradually lost to the Mongols and Tibetans, and by 1642 the whole Qinghai became under the control of the Khoshut Khanate established by Güshi Khan. The region was later conquered by the Qing dynasty around 1724.

== Struggle in Xinjiang ==
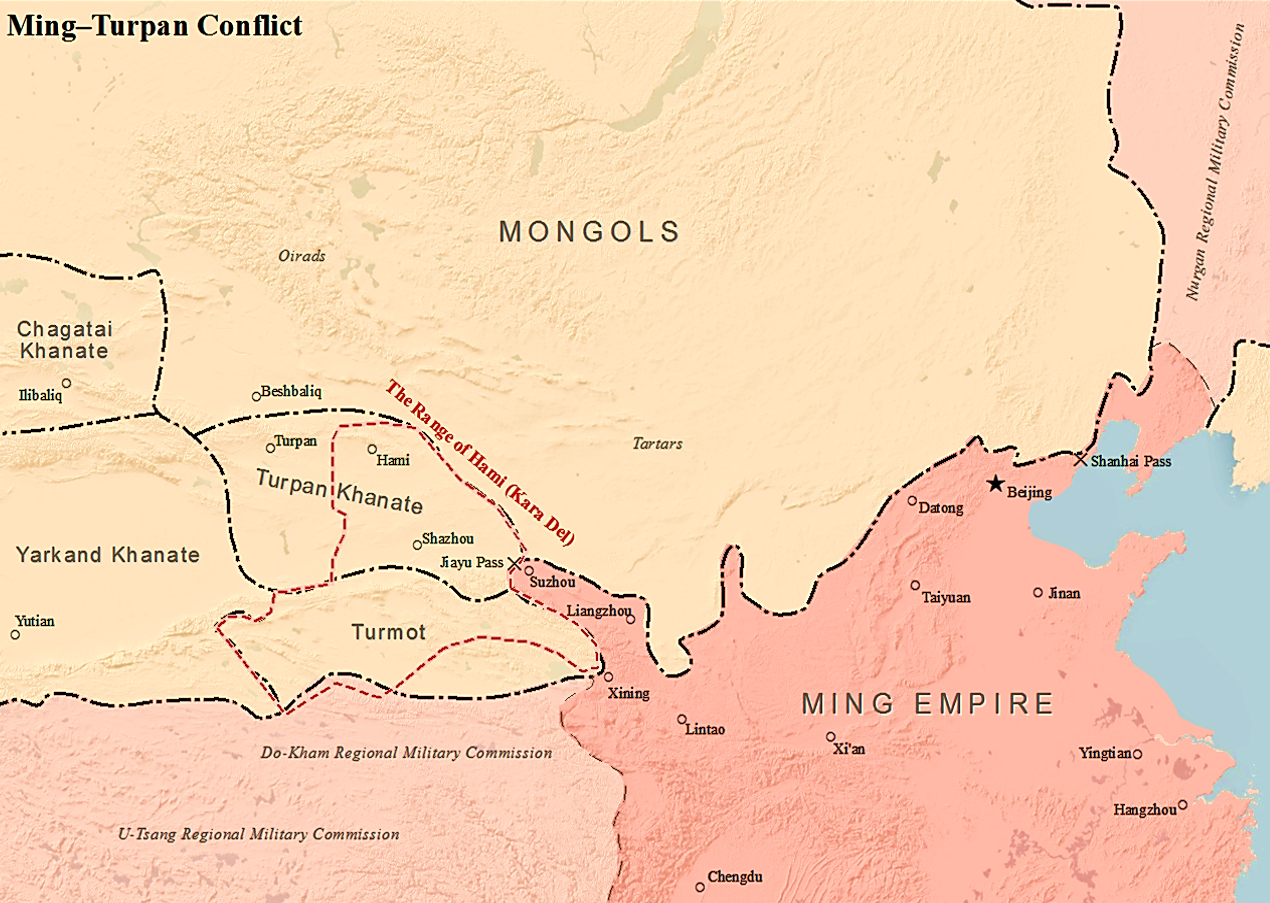
Map showing the areas around the Kara Del kingdom in Hami

The Ming–Turpan conflict were a series of conflicts between the Ming dynasty and the Central Asian-based Khanate of Moghulistan (later its division the Turpan Khanate) that erupted due to disputes over borders, trade and internal succession to the throne of Moghulistan (or Turpan). Ming China at its height controlled portions of eastern Xinjiang before retreating in the early 16th century.

In 1389, the Buddhist Chagataid prince Gunashiri broke away from the Northern Yuan and established the Kara Del kingdom in Hami of present-day Xinjiang. The next year, the Ming dynasty occupied the territory and forced him to submit, although he remained in control of his territory.

In 1404, Gunashiri's successor Engke Temiir accepted the establishment of a Ming guard and became Hami Prefecture. The Ming also defeated the Moghulistan force in 1406, although the Ming did not directly govern Hami, and Engke Temiir was granted the title of "obedient prince" (Chinese: 忠順王) by the Ming court. During the 1430s, Kara Del submitted to the Oirats. In 1446, disturbances broke out in Hami. Ming forces under Ren Li occupied the city and deported 1,230 people to the east of Jiayuguan. However, the situation in Hami never stabilized, and Hami was seized by Mansur Khan, the ruler of Moghulistan in 1513. The whole Xinjiang was later conquered by the Dzungar Khanate and the Qing dynasty by the 18th century.

== Influence in Tibet ==
Tibet was conquered by the Mongol Empire and was later incorporated into the Yuan dynasty founded by Mongol leader Kublai Khan. During the last years of the Yuan dynasty, the Sakya viceregal regime installed by the Mongols in Tibet was overthrown in a rebellion by the Phagmodru myriarch Tai Situ Changchub Gyaltsen (1302–1364), who established the Phagmodrupa dynasty and gained de facto rule over Tibet, although there were civil wars going on in Tibet between rival religious sects. The Yuan dynasty itself was overthrown in 1368 by the Ming dynasty founded by the Hongwu Emperor. Instead of recognizing the Phagmodru ruler, the Hongwu Emperor sided with the Karmapa of the nearer Kham region and southeastern Tibet, sending envoys out in the winter of 1372–1373 to ask the ex-Yuan officeholders to renew their titles for the new Ming court.

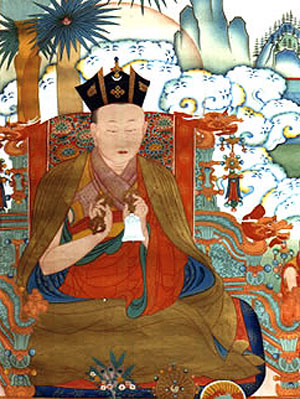
Deshin Shekpa (1384–1415)

In 1403, the Yongle Emperor sent messages, gifts, and envoys to Tibet inviting Deshin Shekpa, the fifth Gyalwa Karmapa of the Kagyu school of Tibetan Buddhism, to visit the imperial capital – apparently after having a vision of the Bodhisattva Avalokitesvara. After a long journey, Deshin Shekpa arrived in Nanjing on 10 April 1407 riding on an elephant towards the imperial palace, where tens of thousands of monks greeted him. After the Karmapa's visit, Yongle promoted the idea that he was the earthly manifestation of Manjushri just like Kublai Khan and styled himself a Buddhist sage ruler. A large amount of Tibetan Buddhist art was created in imperial workshops to demonstrate his authority and right to govern.

Unlike the preceding Mongol Yuan dynasty, the Ming dynasty did not garrison permanent troops in Tibet. The Wanli Emperor (r. 1572–1620) attempted to reestablish Sino-Tibetan relations in the wake of a Mongol-Tibetan alliance initiated in 1578, an alliance which affected the foreign policy of the subsequent Manchu-led Qing dynasty (1644–1912) in their support for the Dalai Lama of the Yellow Hat sect. By the late 16th century, the Mongols proved to be successful armed protectors of the Yellow Hat Dalai Lama, culminating in the conquest of Tibet by Güshi Khan who established the Khoshut Khanate. The Qing dynasty conquered the region in 1720 following the invasion by the Dzungar Khanate.

== See also ==
- Military conquests of the Ming dynasty
- History of the Ming dynasty
- Han dynasty in Inner Asia
- Tang dynasty in Inner Asia
- Yuan dynasty in Inner Asia
- Qing dynasty in Inner Asia

== Bibliography ==
- Atwood, Christopher P. (2004), Encyclopedia of Mongolia and the Mongol Empire, Facts On File
