= Yunnan (Ming province) =

Rule of the Chinese Ming dynasty (1382–1661)

Yunnan under Ming rule
- Territory of the Ming dynasty
- 1382–1661
- Yunnan in the year of 1582
  - Type: Ming hierarchy
- History
  - Ming conquest of Yunnan: 1382
  - Established: 1382
  - Disestablished: 1661
Preceded by	Succeeded by
Northern Yuan	Qing dynasty

Administrative division of Yunnan in the year 1582

Yunnan under Ming rule refers to the rule of the Ming dynasty in Yunnan, which saw the continuation of the tusi system instituted during the Yuan dynasty, increasing centralization, and Han migration into Yunnan.

== Conquest of Yunnan ==
The Ming dynasty conquered Yunnan in April 1382. Prior to the conquest, Yunnan was held by Basalawarmi, an imperial prince of the Yuan dynasty who remained loyal to the rump state of Northern Yuan.

The ruling Duan family was removed from power. Duan Ming and his two sons were taken to Nanjing, where they were assigned honorary posts without any power.

Mu Ying, one of the generals who participated in the conquest, was stationed in Yunnan, and his family remained in power until the end of the Ming dynasty.

== Administrative history ==
=== Zongbing ===
In 1384, the Hongwu Emperor decided to station Mu Ying in Yunnan permanently. The Mu clan held the hereditary military position of zongbing, or commander-in-chief, the highest military position in Yunnan. As a result, the Mu family became incredibly affluent and wealthy, holding sway over the economy and politics of Yunnan into the 1600s. It was not until 1610 that an inspection of the Mu estates was launched, however no further action was ever taken.

=== Military immigration ===
After the conquest of Yunnan, 90,000 soldiers were stationed there. These hereditary military soldiers were encouraged to marry before relocating and were provided with civilian transportation aids by the government. Some were even discharged from the military for being bachelors. Under the weisuo guard battalion system, 30 percent of the military apparatus in Yunnan undertook drilling practice while the rest participated in agricultural production. Military households were followed by land hungry farmers, exiled officials, and profit driven merchants.

The total population of Han settlers in Yunnan in the early 16th century has been estimated to be anywhere between one and three million, about a third of the province's total population. By the end of the Ming dynasty the Han had become the dominant majority in Yunnan. This combination of Han and native cultures paved the way for a province wide Yunnanese identity where there had been none before.

In 1413 a portion of Yunnan was separated and turned into Guizhou province.

=== Native chieftains ===
Yunnan was separated into three broad administrative areas: the inner land north of the Baoshan-Yuanjiang line, the "barbarian" area south of the line, and the furthest south known as yuyi, "containing barbarians".

The inner land included Chuxiong, Yaoan, Heqing, Xundian, Wuding, Lijiang, Luoxiong, Zhaozhou, Lu'nan, Jianchuan, Mile, Shizong, Anning, Ami, Luliang, Zhanyi, Luoci, and Yuanmou.

The barbarian area included Cheli (Chiang Hung), Babai (Lanna), Luchuan (abolished in Luchuan-Pingmian Campaigns, year 1444), Nandian (Lianghe), Ganya (Yingjiang), Longchuan (Longchuan), Mengmao (Ruili), Lujiang, Gengma, Chashan, Menglian.

The furthest south known as yuyi had a few commanders stationed there but was only nominally under Ming control.

In total, there were 179 military native chieftains (tusi) and 255 civilian native chieftains (tuguan) in Yunnan during the Ming period. They were given artifacts of authority such as imperial certificates, seals, hats, and belts. The Ming controlled the native succession process and created detailed laws and codes to follow. In 1436 native chieftains were ordered to provide genealogical charts with names of sons and nephews. In 1441 they were ordered to provide four copies of the charts and update it every three years. In 1489 the Ming proclaimed that regency would be held by the state if the successor was younger than 15. In 1555 native chieftains were forbidden from cross-border marriages and from communication with "outer barbarians".

The Ming also began removing native chieftainships where possible. In 1443 the Heqing tusi was removed, in 1478 Xundian, in 1481 Guangxi, in 1522 Ningzhou, in 1585 Luoxiong, in 1607 Wuding, and in 1621 Yunlong.

In 1395 the state began constructing schools in Yunnan.

In 1481 it became regulation for native boys to be selected for education at the Guozijian.

== See also ==
- Manchuria under Ming rule
- Fourth Chinese domination of Vietnam
- Yongle Emperor's campaigns against the Mongols
- Ming–Tibet relations
- Ming dynasty in Inner Asia
- Military conquests of the Ming dynasty

== Bibliography ==
- Andrade, Tonio (2008j), "Chapter 10: The Beginning of the End", How Taiwan Became Chinese: Dutch, Spanish, and Han Colonization in the Seventeenth Century, Columbia University Press
- Andrade, Tonio (2016), The Gunpowder Age: China, Military Innovation, and the Rise of the West in World History, Princeton University Press, ISBN 978-0-691-13597-7.
- Asimov, M.S. (1998), History of civilizations of Central Asia Volume IV The age of achievement: A.D. 750 to the end of the fifteenth century Part One The historical, social and economic setting, UNESCO Publishing
- Atwood, Christopher P. (2004), Encyclopedia of Mongolia and the Mongol Empire, Facts On File
- Barfield, Thomas (1989), The Perilous Frontier: Nomadic Empires and China, Basil Blackwell
- Barrett, Timothy Hugh (2008), The Woman Who Discovered Printing, Great Britain: Yale University Press, ISBN 978-0-300-12728-7 (alk. paper)
- Beckwith, Christopher I. (2009), Empires of the Silk Road: A History of Central Eurasia from the Bronze Age to the Present, Princeton University Press, ISBN 978-0-691-13589-2
- Beckwith, Christopher I (1987), The Tibetan Empire in Central Asia: A History of the Struggle for Great Power among Tibetans, Turks, Arabs, and Chinese during the Early Middle Ages, Princeton University Press
- Biran, Michal (2005), The Empire of the Qara Khitai in Eurasian History: Between China and the Islamic World, Cambridge Studies in Islamic Civilization, Cambridge, England: Cambridge University Press, ISBN 0521842263
- Bregel, Yuri (2003), An Historical Atlas of Central Asia, Brill
- Chase, Kenneth (2003), Firearms: A Global History to 1700, Cambridge University Press, ISBN 0-521-82274-2.
- Dardess, John (2012), Ming China 1368-1644 A Concise History of A Resilient Empire, Rowman & Littlefield Publishers, Inc.
- Dmytryshyn, Basil (1985), Russia's Conquest of Siberia, Western Imprints, The Press of the Oregon Historical Society
- Dreyer, Edward L. (2007), Zheng He: China and the Oceans in the Early Ming Dynasty, 1405-1433, Pearson Longman
- Drompp, Michael Robert (2005), Tang China And The Collapse Of The Uighur Empire: A Documentary History, Brill
- Duyvendak, J.J.L. (1938), "The True Dates of the Chinese Maritime Expeditions in the Early Fifteenth Century", T'oung Pao, 34 (5): 341–413, doi:10.1163/156853238X00171
- Ebrey, Patricia Buckley (1999), The Cambridge Illustrated History of China, Cambridge: Cambridge University Press, ISBN 0-521-66991-X (paperback).
- Ebrey, Patricia Buckley; Walthall, Anne; Palais, James B. (2006), East Asia: A Cultural, Social, and Political History, Boston: Houghton Mifflin, ISBN 0-618-13384-4
- Fernquest, John (2006), Crucible of War: Burma and the Ming in the Tai Frontier Zone (1382-1454)
- Golden, Peter B. (1992), An Introduction to the History of the Turkic Peoples: Ethnogenesis and State-Formation in Medieval and Early Modern Eurasia and the Middle East, OTTO HARRASSOWITZ · WIESBADEN
- Graff, David A. (2002), Medieval Chinese Warfare, 300-900, Warfare and History, London: Routledge, ISBN 0415239559
- Graff, David Andrew (2016), The Eurasian Way of War Military Practice in Seventh-Century China and Byzantium, Routledge, ISBN 978-0-415-46034-7.
- Hao, Zhidong (2011), Macau History and Society, HKU Press, ISBN 9789888028542.
- Haywood, John (1998), Historical Atlas of the Medieval World, AD 600-1492, Barnes & Noble
- Jin, Dengjian (2016), The Great Knowledge Transcendence, Palgrave Macmillan
- Latourette, Kenneth Scott (1964), The Chinese, their history and culture, Volumes 1-2, Macmillan
- Lewis, James (2015), The East Asian War, 1592-1598: International Relations, Violence and Memory, Routledge
- Liew, Foon Ming (1996), The Luchuan-Pingmian Campaigns (1436-1449) in the Light of Official Chinese Historiography
- Lorge, Peter A. (2008), The Asian Military Revolution: from Gunpowder to the Bomb, Cambridge University Press, ISBN 978-0-521-60954-8
- Luttwak, Edward N. (2009), The Grand Strategy of the Byzantine Empire, The Belknap Press of Harvard University Press
- Mills, J.V.G. (1970), Ying-yai Sheng-lan: 'The Overall Survey of the Ocean's Shores' [1433], Cambridge: Cambridge University Press
- Millward, James (2009), Eurasian Crossroads: A History of Xinjiang, Columbia University Press
- Ming, Liew Foon (1996), The Luchuan-Pingmian Campaigns (1436-1449) in the Light of Official Chinese Historiography
- Mote, F. W. (2003), Imperial China: 900–1800, Harvard University Press, ISBN 978-0674012127
- Needham, Joseph (1986), Science & Civilisation in China, vol. V:7: The Gunpowder Epic, Cambridge University Press, ISBN 0-521-30358-3
- Rong, Xinjiang (2013), Eighteen Lectures on Dunhuang, Brill
- Schafer, Edward H. (1985), The Golden Peaches of Samarkand: A study of T'ang Exotics, University of California Press
- Shaban, M. A. (1979), The ʿAbbāsid Revolution, Cambridge: Cambridge University Press, ISBN 0-521-29534-3
- Sinor, Denis (1990), The Cambridge History of Early Inner Asia, Volume 1, Cambridge University Press
- Sima, Guang (2015), Bóyángbǎn Zīzhìtōngjiàn 54 huánghòu shīzōng 柏楊版資治通鑑54皇后失蹤, Yuǎnliú chūbǎnshìyè gǔfèn yǒuxiàn gōngsī, ISBN 978-957-32-0876-1
- Skaff, Jonathan Karam (2012), Sui-Tang China and Its Turko-Mongol Neighbors: Culture, Power, and Connections, 580-800 (Oxford Studies in Early Empires), Oxford University Press
- Standen, Naomi (2007), Unbounded Loyalty Frontier Crossings in Liao China, University of Hawai'i Press
- Steinhardt, Nancy Shatzman (1997), Liao Architecture, University of Hawaii Press
- Swope, Kenneth M. (2009), A Dragon's Head and a Serpent's Tail: Ming China and the First Great East Asian War, 1592-1598, University of Oklahoma Press.
- Twitchett, Denis C. (1979), The Cambridge History of China, Vol. 3, Sui and T'ang China, 589–906, Cambridge University Press
- Twitchett, Denis (1994), "The Liao", The Cambridge History of China, Volume 6, Alien Regime and Border States, 907-1368, Cambridge: Cambridge University Press, pp. 43–153, ISBN 0521243319
- Twitchett, Denis (1998), The Cambridge History of China Volume 7 The Ming Dynasty, 1368—1644, Part I, Cambridge University Press
- Twitchett, Denis (1998b), The Cambridge History of China Volume 8 The Ming Dynasty, 1368—1644, Part 2, Cambridge University Press
- Twitchett, Denis (2009), The Cambridge History of China Volume 5 The Sung dynasty and its Predecessors, 907-1279, Cambridge University Press
- Wang, Zhenping (2013), Tang China in Multi-Polar Asia: A History of Diplomacy and War, University of Hawaii Press
- Wilkinson, Endymion (2012), Chinese History: A New Manual, Harvard University Asia Center for the Harvard-Yenching Institute
- Wilkinson, Endymion (2015). Chinese History: A New Manual, 4th edition. Cambridge, MA: Harvard University Asia Center distributed by Harvard University Press. ISBN 9780674088467.
- Wills, John E. (2011), China and Maritime Europe, 1500–1800: Trade, Settlement, Diplomacy, and Missions, Cambridge University Press.
- Xiong, Victor Cunrui (2000), Sui-Tang Chang'an: A Study in the Urban History of Late Medieval China (Michigan Monographs in Chinese Studies), U OF M CENTER FOR CHINESE STUDIES, ISBN 0892641371
- Xiong, Victor Cunrui (2009), Historical Dictionary of Medieval China, United States of America: Scarecrow Press, Inc., ISBN 978-0810860537
- Xu, Elina-Qian (2005), HISTORICAL DEVELOPMENT OF THE PRE-DYNASTIC KHITAN, Institute for Asian and African Studies 7
- Xue, Zongzheng (1992), Turkic peoples, 中国社会科学出版社
- Yang, Bin (2008a), "Chapter 3: Military Campaigns against Yunnan: A Cross-Regional Analysis", Between Winds and Clouds: The Making of Yunnan (Second Century BCE to Twentieth Century CE), Columbia University Press
- Yang, Bin (2008b), "Chapter 4: Rule Based on Native Customs", Between Winds and Clouds: The Making of Yunnan (Second Century BCE to Twentieth Century CE), Columbia University Press
- Yang, Bin (2008c), "Chapter 5: Sinicization and Indigenization: The Emergence of the Yunnanese", Between Winds and Clouds: The Making of Yunnan (Second Century BCE to Twentieth Century CE), Columbia University Press
- Yuan, Shu (2001), Bóyángbǎn Tōngjiàn jìshìběnmò 28 dìèrcìhuànguánshídài 柏楊版通鑑記事本末28第二次宦官時代, Yuǎnliú chūbǎnshìyè gǔfèn yǒuxiàn gōngsī, ISBN 957-32-4273-7
- Yule, Henry (1915), Cathay and the Way Thither: Being a Collection of Medieval Notices of China, Vol I: Preliminary Essay on the Intercourse Between China and the Western Nations Previous to the Discovery of the Cape Route, Hakluyt Society
