= Fu Youde =

Chinese general (died 1394)

- 傅友德
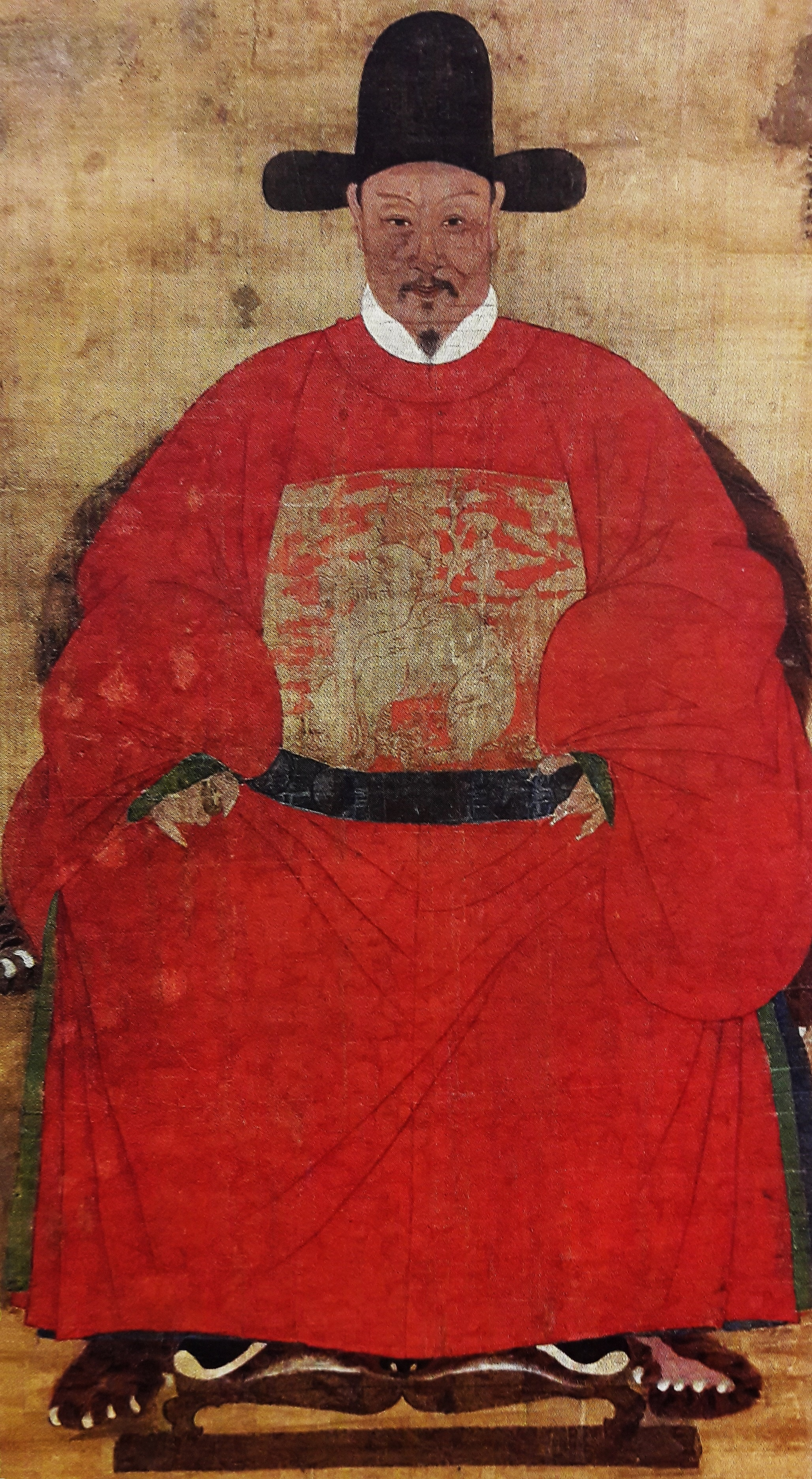
- Fu Youde, National Museum in Warsaw

Personal details
- Born: Suzhou, Anhui
- Died: 20 December 1394 Nanjing
- Occupation: General
- Title: Duke of Ying (Note: Simplified Chinese: 颍国公; traditional Chinese: 潁國公; pinyin: Yǐng Guógōng)
- Posthumous name: Wujing (Note: Chinese: 武靖; pinyin: Wǔjìng)

Chinese name
- Chinese: 傅友德
Transcriptions
Standard Mandarin
- Hanyu Pinyin: Fù Yǒudé

Fu Youde (died 20 December 1394) was a Chinese military general of the Ming dynasty. He played a crucial role in the Red Turban Rebellions, which resulted in the collapse of the Yuan dynasty. Initially, he fought in different armies before joining the forces of Zhu Yuanzhang (the future Hongwu Emperor) in 1361. After the establishment of the Ming dynasty, Fu led the successful conquests of Sichuan in 1371 and Yunnan in 1381. Throughout his career, he alternated between serving on the northern border and in Yunnan.

== Biography ==
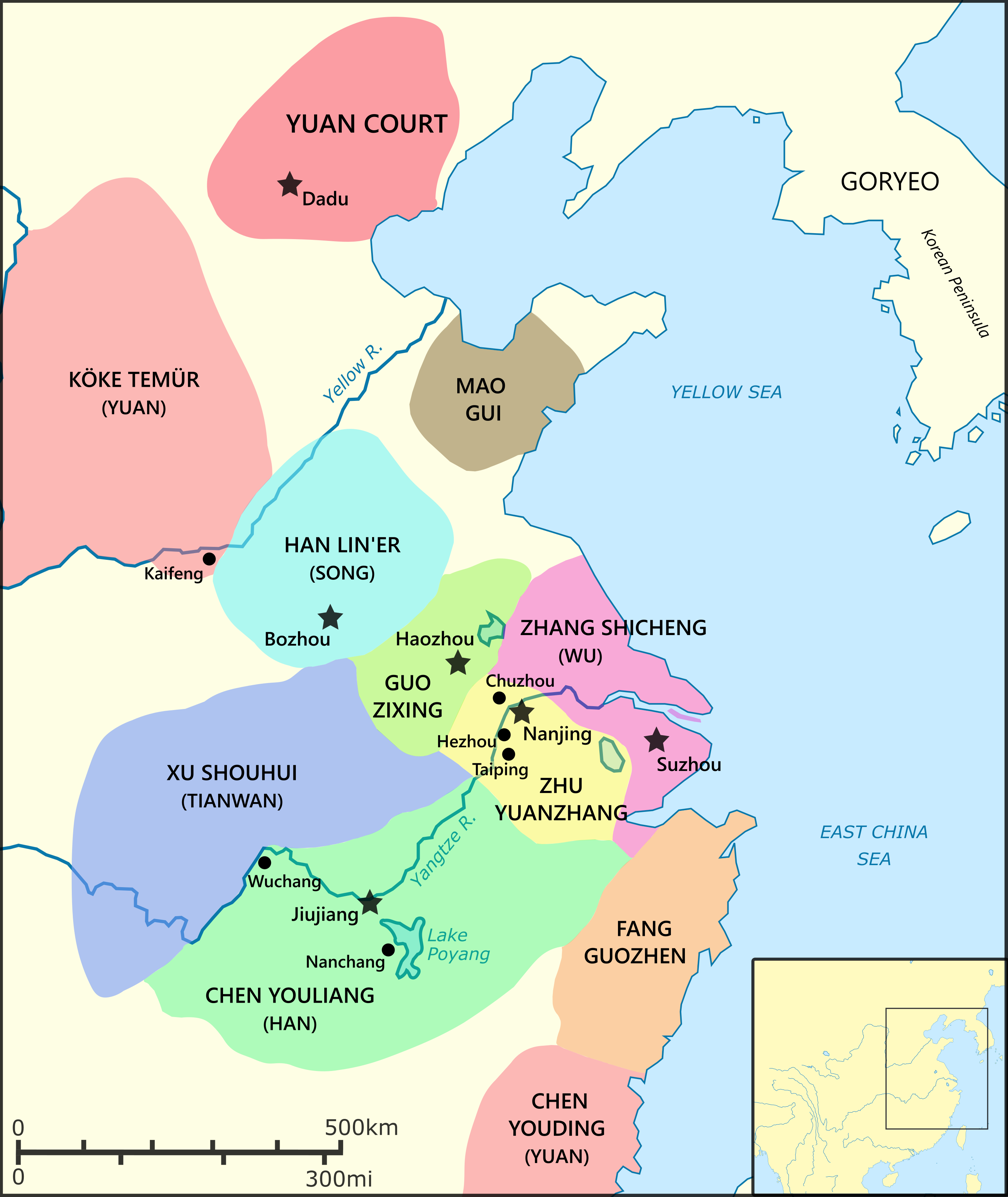
Major powers in China during the late Yuan dynasty, c. 1350–1360

The exact date of Fu Youde's birth is unknown. He was born in Suzhou, in northern Anhui, China, during the Mongol-led Yuan dynasty. His family fled the Yellow River floods and associated social unrest, first settling in Dangshan and later in Yingzhou. Despite his humble rural upbringing and lack of formal education, Fu developed the leadership qualities and martial abilities that allowed him to rise to prominence in his local community while still a young man. At the same time, growing dissatisfaction with the Yuan government's ineffective rule sparked rebellions across the country. In 1351, when the Red Turban Rebellion broke out, Fu joined a local rebel group in Xuzhou. Four years later, when the Red Turban leader Liu Futong proclaimed Han Lin'er emperor of the state of Song, Fu served under the Song regime. He rose through the ranks and eventually became an officer under Li Xixi (李喜喜), one of Liu's generals, participating in military campaigns in Shandong and the metropolitan area. However, after facing several defeats, the army was forced to retreat to the northwest in 1357 and then to Sichuan in 1358. Dissatisfied with Li's leadership, Fu left his service and joined Ming Yuzhen, a rebel general under Xu Shouhui. Xu was the leader of another branch of the Red Turbans in central Yangtze valley, and Ming was then campaigning to conquer Sichuan. Fu again found that his abilities were not fully recognized and defected to Chen Youliang when Chen overthrew and killed Xu in 1360, establishing the state of Han. Despite Fu's loyalty, Chen did not promote him, and in September 1361 he and his troops joined Zhu Yuanzhang. At the time, Zhu was based in Nanjing and nominally recognized Han Lin'er's authority. He later became the first emperor of the Ming dynasty in 1368, known as the Hongwu Emperor.

Under Zhu, Fu found a commander who appreciated his qualities. Fu was not only an excellent tactician, but also personally brave, always leading his troops from the front. He quickly rose to prominence and served under the generals Xu Da and Chang Yuchun. Due to his similar background, he fit in well with Zhu's commanders, who were largely of humble social origins and came from the same region as Fu. Fu played a significant role in the victories against Chen Han in 1363–64, Zhang Shicheng's state of Wu in 1366–67, (Note: Zhang Shicheng, along with Chen Youliang, was Zhu Yuanzhang's most formidable rival. Zhang's domain was centered on Suzhou, east of Zhu's territory.) and the conquest of northern China from the Mongols in 1368–1370. He further demonstrated his military prowess during the conquest of Sichuan and Yunnan, where he led successful campaigns. In November 1370, the Hongwu Emperor appointed 6 dukes and 28 marquises, and Fu received the title of Marquis of Yingchuan (潁川侯).

Fu was given independent command in the campaign against Sichuan. In January 1371, he joined forces with Tang He's army and Liao Yongzhong's (廖永忠) fleet to launch a surprise attack on the enemy from the north, while the Hongwu Emperor's main attack was expected to come from the east along the Yangtze River. The generals conquered Sichuan with relative ease, and both Fu and Liao received praise from the Emperor. Despite their significant contributions to the campaign, neither was granted a dukedom, a decision that historians later criticized as an inadequate reward for their exceptional military achievements.

Fu successfully led campaigns along the northern frontier and in Gansu, constructing fortifications and teaching the Emperor's sons the art of war. In 1381, the Ming government decided to forcibly annex Yunnan, which was still under Mongol control, after diplomatic negotiations failed. The Emperor appointed Fu as the commander-in-chief of the attacking troops, with Lan Yu and Mu Ying as his deputies. He had a large army of 300,000 soldiers, while the enemy had about a third of that number. The campaign began in the fall of 1381, and the Ming forces had captured the provincial capital Kunming by January 1382, followed by Dali in April. The Mongol governor of Yunnan, Basalawarmi, and his associates committed suicide before Kunming fell, but regional commanders continued the resistance. Fu established a provincial administration, while the war with the Mongols continued. Fu and Lan were not able to return with part of the army until April 1384. Fu was promoted to Duke of Ying (潁國公), while Lan and the other generals received financial rewards and minor titles.

In 1385, Fu was assigned to Beijing, but in the following year, he was tasked with suppressing a rebellion in Yunnan. In January 1387, he was appointed as Feng Sheng's deputy for the Liaodong campaign against the Mongol chieftain Naghachu. During this campaign, Fu distinguished himself in battle, while Feng was dismissed for his unsatisfactory performance. Fu was given command of the northeast region of Beijing. From 1388 to 1389, he was once again called upon to fight against rebels in Yunnan. From 1390, he served on the northern frontier.

In March 1392, Fu asked for nearly 1,000 mu (about 58 ha) of land in his native area for a private estate. The Emperor rejected the request angrily, noting that Fu had already received substantial rewards. The rebuke was the sole recorded instance of imperial criticism directed at Fu during his active career. The incident did not affect Fu's subsequent career and had no apparent connection to his death two years later. In March 1393, his colleague Lan was executed on charges of treason, followed by a purge of thousands of his associates. Then, on 20 December 1394, Fu died by suicide. Two other generals, Wang Bi (王弼) and Feng Sheng, died within the next two months. Historians believe that the three generals died as part of the Emperor's effort to eliminate them. Among them, Fu's death has attracted the greatest sympathy, given the exceptional success of his military career and the absence of evidence for significant personal faults.

Fu Youde had two sons and one daughter. In 1391, his daughter married Zhu Jixi (朱濟熺), the Hongwu Emperor's grandson and the eldest son of Prince Zhu Gang. In the same year, Fu's elder son Fu Zhong (傅忠) married the Hongwu Emperor's ninth daughter, Princess Shouchun (壽春公主, married 1386, died 1388). Fu Zhong and his younger brother Fu Zhang (傅讓) were both officers, but it is unclear if either of them survived their father. In 1645, the Hongguang Emperor of the Southern Ming gave Fu Youde the posthumous name Wujing (武靖).

== See also ==
- Ming campaign against the Uriankhai
