= Ming conquest of Yunnan =

Ancient Chinese military campaign

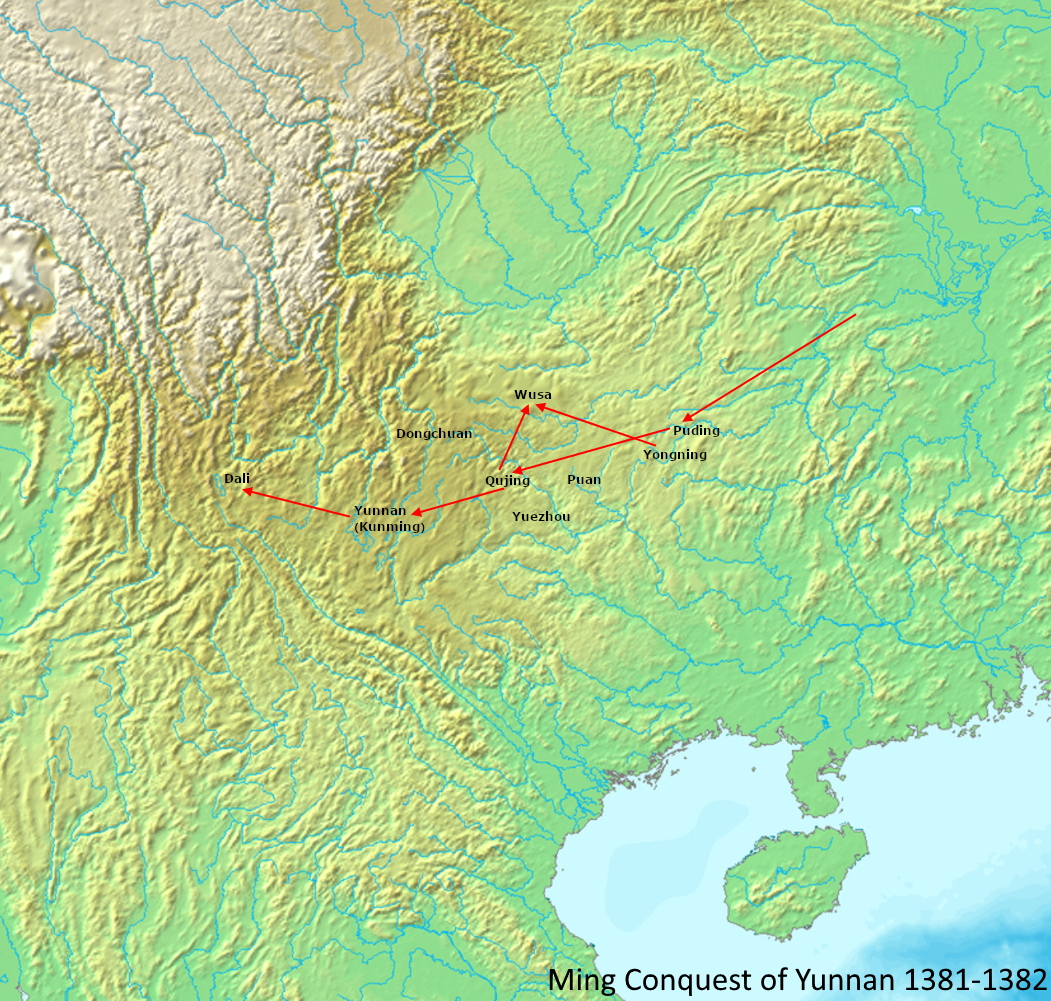
- Ming conquest of Yunnan 1381–1382
Date	1381–1382
Location	Yunnan
Result	Ming victory

Belligerents
Ming dynasty Pro Ming Hui Muslims	Northern Yuan (Yuan remnants in Yunnan); House of Duan (Dali loyalists)

Commanders and leaders
Hongwu Emperor; Fu Youde; Lan Yu; Mu Ying	Basalawarmi (Prince of Liang); Duan Shi (Governor-general of Dali)

Strength
250,000	Thousands of Mongol and Chinese Muslim troops

Casualties and losses
Heavy losses due to disease	Thousands killed, 20,000 captured, hundreds castrated

The Ming dynasty expelled the Mongol-led Yuan dynasty from China proper in the 1380s.

== Background ==
The Hongwu Emperor had sent envoys to Yunnan in 1369, 1370, 1372, 1374, and 1375 to request for its submission. Some of the envoys were killed and this was the causa belli under which an invasion was launched against the regime in Yunnan, then still loyal to the Northern Yuan.

== War ==
Some 250,000 to 300,000 Han and Hui Muslim troops were mobilized to crush the remaining Yuan-held territory in Yunnan in 1381.

The Ming General Fu Youde led the attack on the Mongol and Muslim forces of the Northern Yuan. Also fighting on the Ming side were Generals Mu Ying and Lan Yu, who led Ming loyalist Muslim troops against Yuan loyalist Muslims.

The Prince of Liang, Basalawarmi, committed suicide on January 6, 1382, as the Ming dynasty troops overwhelmed the Northern Yuan's Mongol and Muslim forces. Mu Ying troops were given hereditary status as military garrisons of the Ming dynasty and remained in the province.

== Dali loyalists ==
Duan Shi, the 13th and the last hereditary Governor-General of Dali, whose ancestors were once the rulers of the Dali Kingdom prior to the Mongol conquest, and had administered the region under the Yuan dynasty, refused to accept Ming administration. He made it clear that Dali could only be a tributary to the Ming. In 1382 Lan Yu and Mu Ying's forces attacked and crushed Duan's realm after a fierce battle. The last Dali stronghold of Dengchuan (邓川) fell to the Ming in February 1383, the Duan family were taken captive and escorted to the Ming capital of Nanjing.

== Aftermath ==
The Ming Generals Lan Yu and Fu Youde castrated 380 captured Mongol and Muslim captives after the war. This led to many of them becoming eunuchs and serving the Ming Emperor. One of the eunuchs was Zheng He.

In Luchuan (in modern-day Ruili and northern Myanmar), Möng Mao forces rebelled against the Ming from 1386 to 1389 and again from 1397 to 1398.

In western Yunnan and Guizhou, Ming soldiers also crushed local rebellions. The Ming soldiers then married local Han, Miao, and Yao women; their descendants are called "Tunbao", in contrast to newer Han immigrants who moved to Yunnan in later centuries. The Tunbao still live in Yunnan today.

== See also ==
- Ming campaign against the Uriankhai
- Ming–Turpan conflict

== Bibliography ==
- Dardess, John (2012), Ming China 1368-1644 A Concise History of A Resilient Empire, Rowman & Littlefield Publishers, Inc.
- Dillon, Michael (1999). China's Muslim Hui community: migration, settlement and sects. Routledge. ISBN 0-7007-1026-4.
- Yang, Bin (2008a), "Chapter 3: Military Campaigns against Yunnan: A Cross-Regional Analysis", Between Winds and Clouds: The Making of Yunnan (Second Century BCE to Twentieth Century CE), Columbia University Press
