= Ming–Mong Mao War (1386–1388) =

Military conflict

Date	January 1386 – 1388
Location	Jingdong, Moshale and Dingbian, all in the central of Yunnan
Result	Ming victory

Belligerents
Mong Mao	Ming dynasty

Commanders and leaders
Si Lunfa; Dao Silang	Mu Ying; Ning Zheng; Feng Cheng

Strength
100,000–300,000; 100 elephants	30,000+

Casualties and losses
31,500 killed; 10,000 captured; 50 elephants killed; 37 elephants captured	?

The Ming–Mong Mao War (Chinese: 明麓戰爭) was a military conflict waged between the Ming dynasty and the previously subordinate Shan state of Mong Mao based in Luchuan-Pingmian, which encompasses modern Longchuan, Ruili, and the Gaoligong Mountains.

== Background ==
After the Ming conquest of Yunnan in February 1382 the Mong Mao under Si Lunfa decided to submit to Ming authority, and was granted the tusi title of Pacification Commissioner of Pingmian Pacification Commission. In August 1384 Si Lunfa sent a tribute mission to the Ming court surrendering the Yuan seal of commission. As a result he was promoted to Luchuan-Pingmian Pacification Commission with authority over military and civilian affairs. However Si Lunfa was not content with his position and in January 1386 he led a force of over 100,000 in an attack on Jingdong prefecture.

== Battle ==
Initially Feng Cheng was appointed the command of a division to suppress the revolt, but due to heavy fog and bad weather they were forced to retreat. The expedition suffered one casualty, the thousand-commander Wang Sheng.

In May 1387 the emperor dispatched the Marquis of Xiping, Mu Ying, with the task of restricting travel to Pingmian in order to isolate them.

In February 1388 Si Lunfa enlisted the aid of several other tribes and amassed a force under Dao Silang to attack the Moshale stockade and captured it. Mu Ying dispatched Ning Zheng to recapture Moshale (modern Mosha Town in Xinping County). The Ming forces defeated the rebels, who suffered more than 1,500 casualties. However Si Lunfa was able to recuperate and enlisted most of the other tribes in southwestern Yunnan to his cause, amassing a force as large as 300,000 by some estimates as well as 100 war elephants, and attacked Dingbian county (modern Nanjian County).

Mu Ying mobilized an additional 30,000 soldiers from other regions and met Si Lunfa's army in battle. The Ming vanguard sent out a contingent of light cavalry 300 strong to provoke the rebel army to give chase. The Mong Mao took the bait and met them with 10,000 men and 30 elephants, but were repulsed and forced to retreat with heavy casualties.

First 300 light cavalrymen were sent to provoke them [the Tais]. The Bai-yi [Tais] met them with 10,000 men and 30 vanguard elephants to do battle. Zhang Yin, commander of the Yun-nan Forward Guard, led 50-plus cavalrymen as a vanguard, while the chieftains, astride their huge elephants, proceeded forward. Our army let fly with their arrows and these hit an elephant in the left knee and the ribs. The elephant fell to the ground and the chieftain was also hit, but fled. He was pursued and killed with arrows. Then, with great screams, the troops rushed orward and hundreds of heads were taken. The army took advantage of the victory and proceeded forward with a great uproar. The bandit forces thus drew back.

— Ming Shilu

The next day Ming and Shan troops returned to the field. Ming soldiers equipped with guns and fire arrows were arrayed in three lines. Mu Ying explained that this was so that "when the elephants advance, the front line of guns and arrows will shoot all at once. If they do not retreat, the next line will continue this. If they still do not retreat, then the third line will continue this." When the armored war elephants broke into a run, charging the Ming lines, the Ming forces stood their ground, "shooting arrows and stones, the noise shaking the mountains and valleys. The elephants shook with fear and ran." Ming forces pursued the retreating rebels right up to their stockade and set their encampment on fire. The fighting continued at the forefront and the intensity of the battle was such that the left wing of the Ming army started to retreat. Seeing this from his vantage point, Mu Ying sent orders for the left wing commander to be executed. Alarmed by this development, the commander rushed forward to join battle out of fright, and his troops followed him. According to the Ming Shilu, half the elephants were killed while 37 were captured, at least 30,000 were killed, and 10,000 were captured.

[Mu Ying] issued orders to the army to set up guns and 'mystical-mechanism arrows' in three lines within the ranks. Then when the elephants advanced, the front line of guns was to fire its arrows. If the elephants did not retreat, the second line was to fire off its arrows. If the elephants still did not fall back, the third line was to fire its arrows... [The Tais] came out of their camp and joined ranks to meet them. The chieftains, local commanders and the zhao-gang [Mong Mao lord controlling 1000 people, see Wade, 1996, app. 2, p. 2] all rode on elephants. The elephants were all armoured and on their backs they bore a battle-turret like a parapet, while bamboo tubes hung on the two sides. Short lances were placed between these prepared for attacks. When the forces were about to meet, the massed elephants rushed forward. Our army attacked them and fired off arrows and stones. The sound shook the mountains and valleys and the elephants, shaking with fear, fled.

— Ming Shilu

== Aftermath ==
Si Lunfa was forced to accept Ming suzerainty while the Ming recognized Mong Mao as a semi-independent tusi. In addition the Ming agreed to aid Mong Mao against the Kingdom of Ava and other rivals in Burma.

== Bibliography ==
- Andrade, Tonio (2016), The Gunpowder Age: China, Military Innovation, and the Rise of the West in World History, Princeton University Press, ISBN 978-0-691-13597-7.
- Dardess, John (2012), Ming China 1368-1644 A Concise History of A Resilient Empire, Rowman & Littlefield Publishers, Inc.
- Fernquest, John (2006), Crucible of War: Burma and the Ming in the Tai Frontier Zone (1382-1454)
- Liew, Foon Ming (1996), The Luchuan-Pingmian Campaigns (1436-1449) in the Light of Official Chinese Historiography
