= Buir Lake =

Freshwater lake on the China-Mongolia border

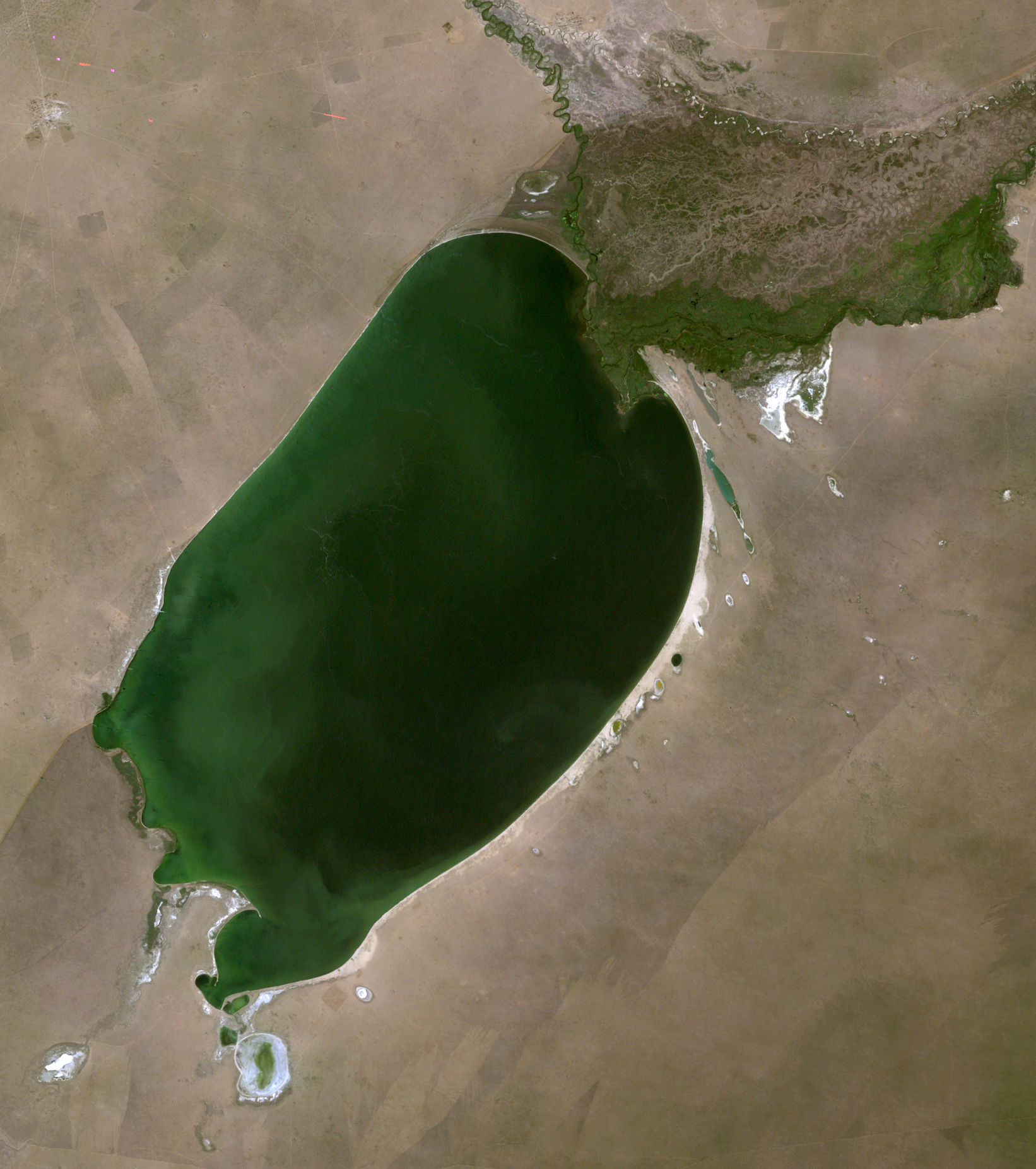
- Satellite image of Buir Lake

- Location within Mongolia
- Location: Dornod Province, Mongolia and Hulunbei'er, China
- Coordinates: 47°48′25″N 117°41′32″E

Ramsar Wetland
- Official name: Lake Buir and its surrounding wetlands
- Designated: 22 March 2004
- Reference no.: 1377

Buir Lake (Note: Mongolian: Буйр нуур, romanized: Buir nuur; Chinese: 贝尔湖; pinyin: Bèi'ěr Hú) is a freshwater lake that straddles the border between Mongolia and China. It lies within the Buir Lake Depression. The Chinese city of Hulunbuir is named after both this lake and Hulun Lake, which lies entirely on the Chinese side of the border in Inner Mongolia.

In 1388, Ming forces under Lan Yu won a major victory over the Northern Yuan on the Buir Lake region. Northern Yuan ruler Tögüs Temür tried to escape but was killed shortly afterwards.

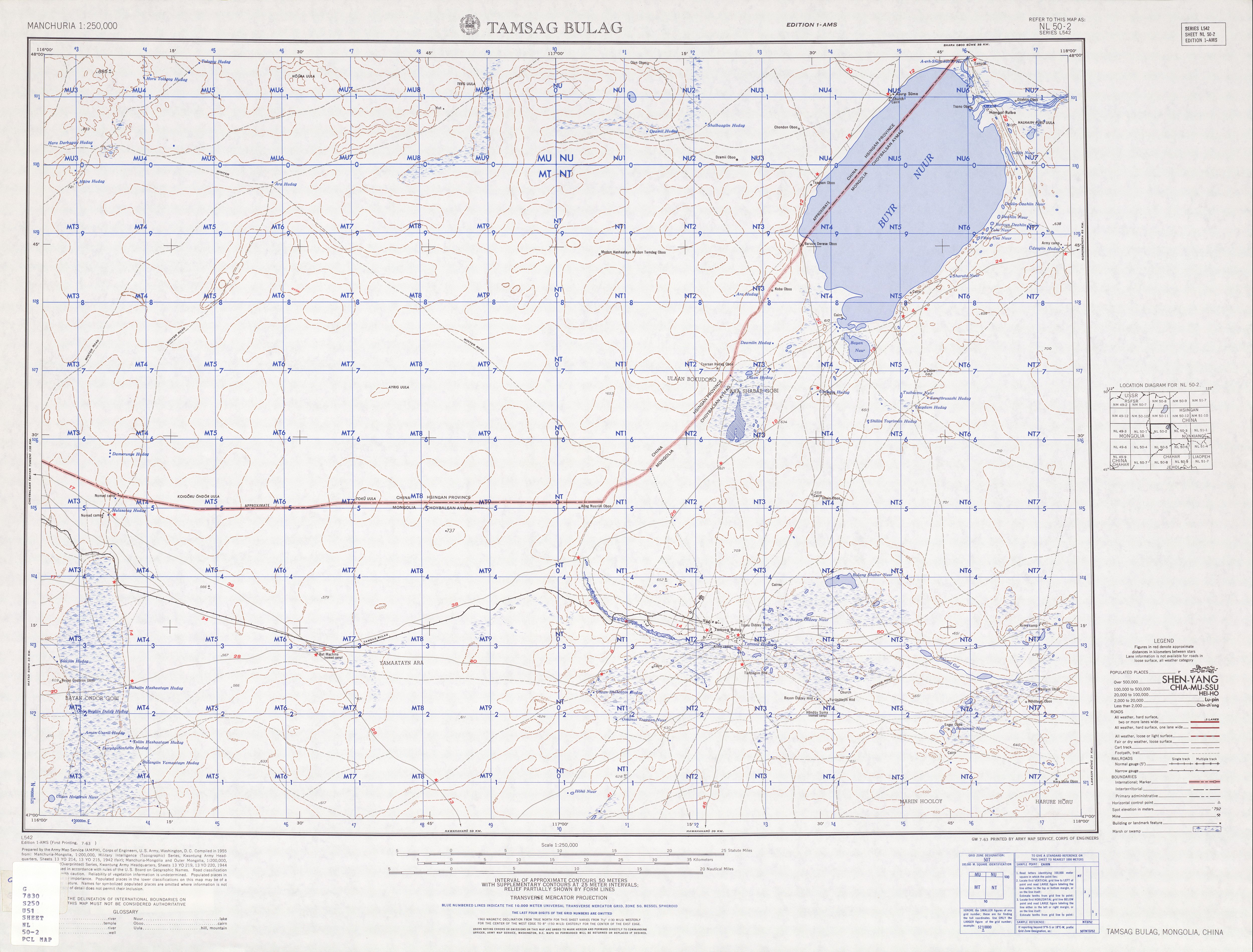
Map of Tamsagbulag area

Mongolian border guards patrol the lake with a small number of motorboats.
