= Battle of Buir Lake =

1388 battle between Ming and Northern Yuan

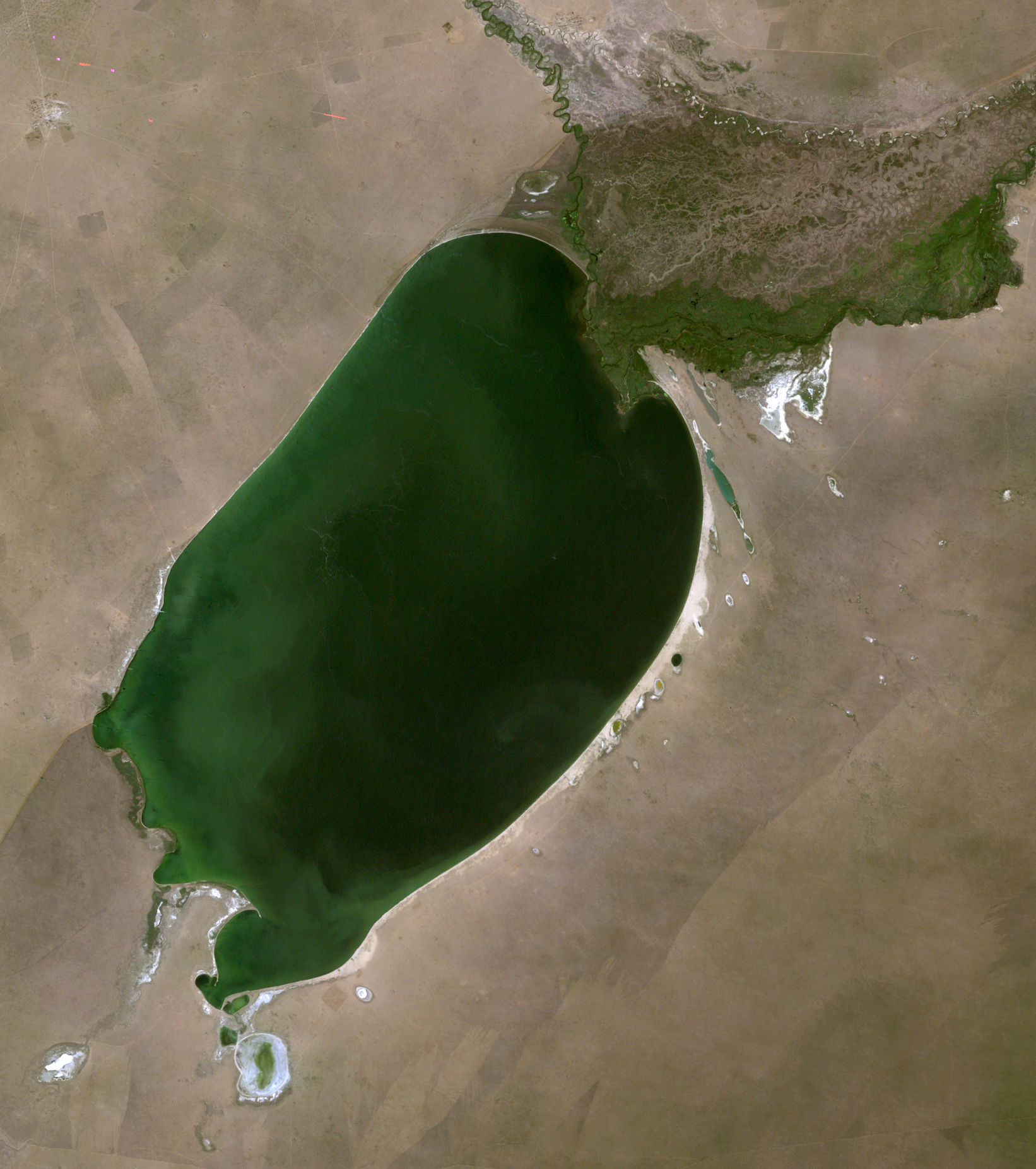
Date	1388
Location	Northeast of the Buir Lake 48.1°N 118°E
Result	Ming victory

Belligerents
Ming dynasty	Northern Yuan dynasty

Commanders and leaders
Hongwu Emperor; Lan Yu; Tang Shengzong; Guo Ying	Tögüs Temür; Tian Baonu; DI Baonu (surrendered)

Strength
150,000 soldiers	Unknown

Casualties and losses
Minimal	80,000 captured
- Location within China Battle of Buir Lake (Mongolia)

The Battle of Buir Lake (Note: Also spelled as the Battle of Buyur Lake (simplified Chinese: 捕鱼儿海之战; traditional Chinese: 捕魚兒海之戰)) was fought between the Ming and Northern Yuan dynasties at the Buir Lake in 1388. The Ming army was led by General Lan Yu, who undertook the military campaign against the Northern Yuan horde led by Tögüs Temür. The Ming army defeated the Northern Yuan horde at the Buir Lake and captured many of their people.

== Background ==
Bolstered by the successful military campaign against the Mongol commander Naghachu and his Uriyankhad horde in 1387, resulting in Naghachu and his horde's surrender, the Hongwu Emperor ordered General Lan Yu to lead an army on a military campaign against the Mongol khan Tögüs Temür.

== Battle ==
In December 1387, the Hongwu Emperor ordered Lan Yu to lead a campaign against Tögüs Temür. Lan led a Ming army comprising 150,000 soldiers in the campaign.

Lan and his army marched through the Great Wall to Daning and then towards Qingzhou, where spies informed them that Tögüs Temür was encamped near the Buir Lake. Subsequently, the Ming army advanced northward across the Gobi Desert, eventually reaching the Buir Lake.

They did not see the Northern Yuan horde when they came within 40 li of the Buir Lake, which disheartened Lan. However, General Wang Bi (王弼; Marquis of Dingyuan), a subordinate, reminded Lan that it would be foolish to return with such a large army without accomplishing something. They eventually found out that the Northern Yuan horde was northeast of the Buir Lake, after which they approached under the cover of darkness and a sandstorm. On 18 May 1388, near the Buir Lake, the Ming army launched an attack against the Northern Yuan forces, who were caught off guard. The battle concluded with the Ming capturing many Mongols, but Tögüs Temür escaped.

== Aftermath ==
The Hongwu Emperor issued a proclamation praising Lan Yu and comparing him to the famous General Wei Qing of the Han. Lan was created Duke of Liang (涼國公) with a stipend of 3,000 shi and given the honorific Grand Tutor (太傅) for his military successes. Six of Lan's subordinates were made marquises, while the other officers and soldiers received generous rewards.

Langlois (1998) stated that the Ming captured 100 members of Tögüs Temür's family (including his younger son Ti-pao-nu), 3000 princes and their subordinates, 77,000 men and women from the camp, various imperial seals of office, and 150,000 domesticated animals, but that Tögüs Temür and his eldest son T'ien-pao-nu escaped. Dreyer (1982) stated that the Ming captured 3000 notables, 70,000 ordinary Mongols, many domestic animals, the Northern Yuan crown prince and his younger brother, but that Tögüs Temür escaped. Tsai (2001) stated that the Ming captured Tögüs Temür's second son, General Qarajang, hundreds of thousands of Mongol people, and their livestock, but that Tögüs Temür and the crown prince escaped.

In his flight from the Ming army, Tögüs Temür eventually arrived at the Tula River, where he was murdered by the Mongol chieftain Yesüder.
