= Lan Yu (general) =

Chinese general (died 1393)

- 藍玉
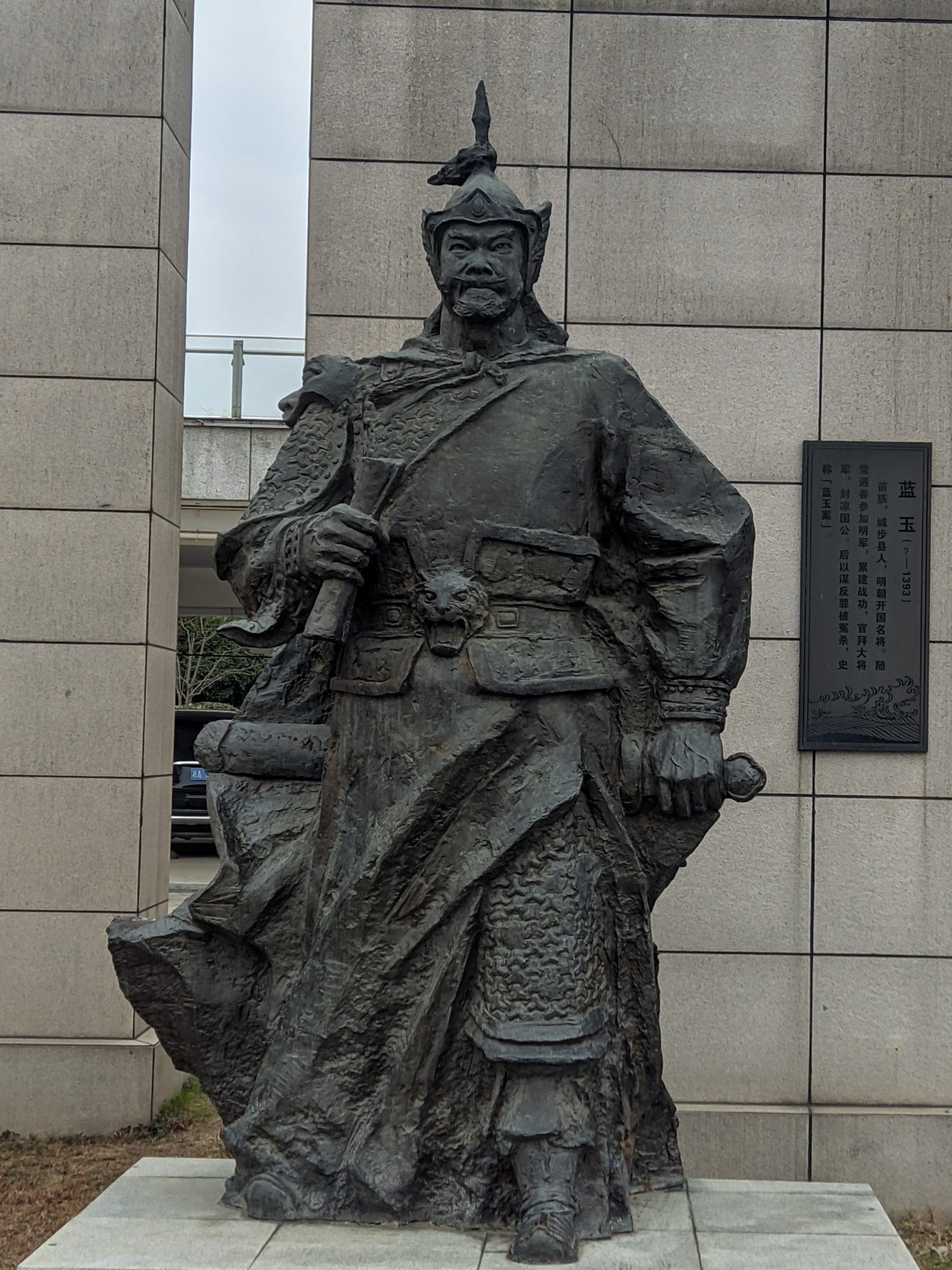
- Statue of Lan Yu at Ailian

Personal details
- Born: Dingyuan County, Anhui
- Died: 22 March 1393
- Cause of death: Execution
- Occupation: General
- Title: Marquis of Yongchang (Note: Chinese: 永昌侯; pinyin: Yǒngchāng Hóu) (1379); Duke of Liang (Note: Simplified Chinese: 凉国公; traditional Chinese: 涼國公; pinyin: Liáng Guógōng) (1389)

Military service
- Battles/wars: Ming conquest of Yunnan; Ming campaign against the Uriankhai; Battle of Buir Lake

Chinese name
- Traditional Chinese: 藍玉
- Simplified Chinese: 蓝玉
Transcriptions
Standard Mandarin
- Hanyu Pinyin: Lán Yù
- Wade–Giles: Lan^{2} Yü^{4}
- IPA: [lǎn ŷ]
Yue: Cantonese
- Yale Romanization: Làahm Yuhk
- Jyutping: Laam4 Juk6
- IPA: [lam˩ jʊk̚˨]
Southern Min
- Hokkien POJ: Lâm Gio̍k

Lan Yu (died 22 March 1393) was a Chinese military leader and one of the most influential generals of the Hongwu Emperor, the founding emperor of the Ming dynasty. His exceptional military skills and the support of his brother-in-law, Chang Yuchun, earned him a high-ranking position in the Ming army. Throughout the 1380s, he rose to prominence as one of the empire's top military leaders. In 1393, he was accused of conspiracy and attempted coup, leading to his downfall and execution. His family and a large number of his relatives and subordinates were also executed, resulting in the deaths of thousands of people during the purge.

== Early career ==
Lan Yu was from Dingyuan in Anhui Province. In the 1360s, his elder sister married Chang Yuchun, the second most important general of Zhu Yuanzhang, who was establishing his own state during the Red Turban Rebellion against the Mongol-led Yuan dynasty. Lan served as an officer in Chang's army and quickly rose through the ranks during this period.

By 1371, Lan had become a general in Fu Youde's army, which was tasked with conquering Sichuan under the Hongwu Emperor's orders. The following year, Lan was transferred to the army of Xu Da, which marched north from Shanxi to confront Mongol warlord Köke Temür. In April 1372, Lan led a separate force and defeated Köke Temür at the Tula River. He then continued to serve in the north, leading an expedition against the Mongols gathered north of Kalgan in 1374. In 1375, Lan played a role in the defense of Yan'an against the Mongols.

In November 1378, the Emperor appointed Lan as Mu Ying's deputy in the campaign against the Tibetans in Gansu. In October 1379, the Tibetans suffered a defeat, and the Ming generals returned to the capital. In December 1379, the Emperor awarded twelve of them noble titles. Most of these generals were later executed as members of Lan's conspiracy. Lan himself became the Marquis of Yongchang (永昌侯), with an annual income of 2,000 dan (about 119 tons) of grain.

In September 1381, Lan served as Fu's deputy during the Ming conquest of Yunnan. In January 1382, after Ming troops defeated the Yuan army in the first phase of the campaign, Lan led a separate detachment to Dali and conquered it, gaining control of northwestern Yunnan. The Emperor awarded Lan by increasing his income to 2,500 dan and allowed his daughter to marry the Emperor's eleventh son, Zhu Chun, Prince of Shu.

In September 1385, Feng Sheng, along with his deputies Lan and Fu, assumed control of the army in Beijing. After thorough preparations, they were tasked with suppressing the Mongol forces in southern Manchuria in January 1387. Lan led the vanguard and defeated some of the Mongols. In July that year, the main Ming army defeated the enemy forces and captured their commander Naghachu. In September 1387, the Hongwu Emperor dismissed Feng due to his unsatisfactory performance during the campaign. Lan then took over as the commander of the army and established his headquarters east of Beijing. In November 1387, Lan was given the order to attack the main Mongol forces under Khan Tögüs Temür. By mid-May 1388, a massive army of 150,000 Ming troops had marched across the Gobi Desert into northeastern Mongolia. They took the Mongols by surprise at Buir Lake, located 500 miles (800 km) north of Beijing. Although Tögüs Temür fled the battle, Lan's troops were able to capture tens of thousands of prisoners and defeat the Mongol general Qarajang on their way back. Upon returning to Nanjing in September 1388, Lan and his subordinates were generously rewarded for their victory. On 19 January 1389, the Emperor granted Lan the title Duke of Liang (涼國公) with an annual income of 3,000 dan. (Note: The Emperor originally intended to grant Lan Yu the more elegant title of "Duke of Liang" (梁國公), but changed the Chinese character for "Liang" from "梁" to "涼" after he heard Lan seized a Mongol noble lady for himself and violated her. This resulted in a change in the area that was to be Lan's dukedom. (梁 referred to an area covering parts of present-day Hubei, Henan and Anhui, while 涼 covered the area around present-day central Gansu.)) This was a significant achievement, as he was only the third duke to be appointed since 1370. (Note: The others were generals Tang He in 1378 and Fu Youde in 1384.) Lan was part of a new generation of generals who rose to prominence after the civil wars of the 1360s. The Emperor also compared Lan to Han general Wei Qing and Tang general Li Jing.

In March 1389, Lan was sent to Sichuan, and the following year he suppressed revolts in southwestern Huguang. Upon his return to Nanjing in September 1390, the Emperor increased his income to 3,500 dan. In April 1391, he sent Lan to Shaanxi with two other dukes and several marquises to command the frontier army.

== Downfall and death ==
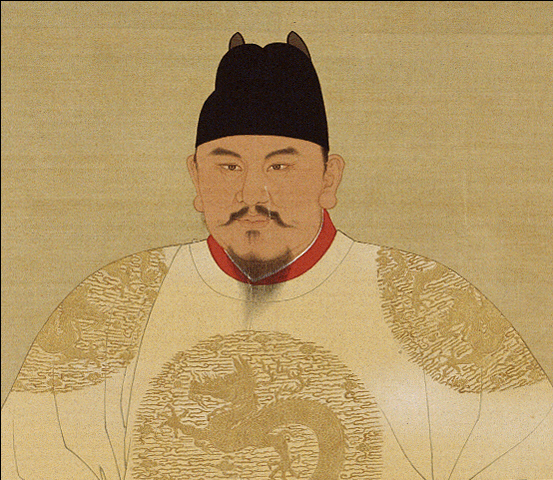
Portrait of the Hongwu Emperor. National Palace Museum, Taipei

In February 1392, the Emperor dismissed several influential generals from their commands, including Lan, Li Jinglong, and Chang Sheng. The Emperor had developed a distrust of the military elite as a whole, but Lan still retained his favor, despite his occasional tactless behavior. In March, Lan was sent to command the army in Lanzhou against the Mongols. In Sichuan, the commander of the Jianchang guard, Yelü Temür (月魯帖木兒), gained the support of local non-Chinese tribes and rebelled. The troops loyal to the Ming were unable to stop Yelü Temür, so Lan and his army were sent to confront him. Before his arrival, the loyalists defeated the rebels in July 1392 and captured their commander by the end of the year. In order to prevent future rebellions, Lan proposed relocating a larger number of soldier-peasants to Sichuan. This recommendation came at a time when the government faced the issue of soldiers being abused by their commanders. The Emperor, angered by this issue, used it as a pretext to recall Lan to Nanjing in December 1392.

In August 1392, the Emperor initiated a purge of military commanders. Zhou Dexing, Marquis of Jiangxia, was accused of treason and subsequently executed, and the following month Lan's relative Ye Sheng, Marquis of Jingning, was also executed. Additionally, the Emperor relieved several dukes and marquises of their commands and sent them back to their respective fiefs.

In late 1392, the Emperor sent Lan to the northwest to suppress the Mongol rebellion of Orlug Temür, which he quashed in December that year. Upon his return to Nanjing, he demanded levies from local peasants for further campaigns in the west. The Emperor refused Lan's request and relieved him of his command. In January 1393, the Emperor gave Lan the honorary title of grand tutor (taifu) as partial compensation. However, he loudly complained that his colleagues Feng and Fu held a title one level higher (grand preceptor, taishi), which moved him further from the Emperor's favor.

Zhu Di, the militarily accomplished fourth son of the Hongwu Emperor, played a significant role in fueling the Emperor's distrust towards his arrogant generals. One of his main targets was Lan, whom he saw as a threat due to his close relationship with the heir to the throne, Zhu Yunwen, who was the Emperor's grandson and Zhu Di's nephew. Zhu Yunwen's stepmother, Lady Cheng, was Lan's niece. According to historian Wang Shizhen (1526–1590), Zhu Di brought about Lan's arrest and execution. The prince may also have been responsible for the suspicious deaths of Feng and Fu in late 1394 and early 1395.

In the early months of 1393, the Embroidered Uniform Guard arrested several of Lan's former subordinates and coerced them into confessing against him. In February 1393, four of the Emperor's sons were hastily sent to the northern frontiers, with three of them not even having built their own residences yet. In March 1393, Lan, along with a large number of his subordinates and allies, was arrested and accused of conspiracy and rebellion. They were subsequently executed on 22 March.

In the subsequent purges, approximately 20,000 people were executed, including one duke and thirteen marquises. During the purges of the early 1390s, the Emperor eliminated the military nobility, leaving a power vacuum eventually filled by individuals closely associated with the Emperor, particularly his sons. It is possible the removal of influential and meritorious individuals was a strategic move to ensure a smooth transfer of power to the heir to the throne.

== See also ==
- Ming campaign against the Uriankhai
