= Ming campaign against the Uriankhai =

Offensive military expedition campaign

Date	1387
Location	Manchuria
Result	Ming victory
Territorial changes	Ming conquest of Manchuria

Belligerents
Ming dynasty	Uriankhai Mongol horde

Commanders and leaders
General Feng Sheng; General Fu Youde; General Lan Yu; Zhu Di, Prince of Yan	Naghachu (surrendered)

Units involved
150,000 soldiers in the field 50,000 soldiers at the fortresses	Unknown

Strength
200,000 soldiers	Unknown

The Ming campaign against the Uriankhai was a 1387 offensive military expedition by the Ming dynasty's army led by General Feng Sheng against the Uriankhai Mongol horde led by the chieftain Naghachu in Manchuria, which concluded with the surrender of the Uriankhai to the Ming and the capture of Manchuria by the Ming.

== Background ==
During the 1380s, the Mongol commander Naghachu had organized the many Mongol tribes of Manchuria into the Uriankhai. They frequently clashed with the Chinese along Ming China's northeastern frontier regions.

== Course ==
In December 1386, the Hongwu Emperor ordered Feng Sheng to lead an army of 200,000 soldiers against the Mongols. In early 1387, Feng Sheng was commissioned as the Grand General, assigned Fu Youde and Lan Yu to assist him, and raised a large army. The Hongwu Emperor drew up the plans with the ultimate objective to conquer Jinshan.

The Ming army comprised 200,000 soldiers. It included 50,000 soldiers that garrisoned four fortresses. General Feng Sheng and General Fu Youde commanded the front army, while General Lan Yu commanded the rear army. Zhu Di, Prince of Yan, commanded the princely guard, but saw relatively limited action.

In January 1388, Feng Sheng led the Ming army to Tongzhou (通州), where he sent Lan Yu with a cavalry unit to attack a Mongol force at Qingzhou (慶州). Lan Yu defeated the Mongol force, capturing many Mongols, including the Mongol governor, and their horses. On 20 March 1387, Feng Sheng led the Ming army northward through the Great Wall.

Fortresses were constructed at Daning (大寧), Fuyu (富峪), Huizhou (會州), and Kuanhe (寛河) near the Great Wall of China and completed at the end of the summer of 1387. In Daning, a regional military commission was established to command the four fortresses. Beiping, Shandong, Shanxi, and Henan provinces dispatched the peasantry to transport grain to the north. Millions of piculs of foodstuff were stored at the four fortresses, which served as advance bases.

Feng Shen led his main army further eastward. He left about 50,000 troops at Daning. On 7 July 1387, Chen Yong (陳鏞; Marquis of Linjiang) and his division became separated from the main army and was ambushed, which resulted in the killing of Chen.

In July 1387, the Ming army advanced further and crossed the Liao River. Within a few days after crossing the river, they surrounded the Mongol stronghold of Jinshan. Within that month, the Ming army established their encampment west of Jinshan.

Feng Sheng returned Nayira'u (Naghachu's former lieutenant, captured in 1376) to Naghachu with a letter that stated that he should surrender and accept the suzerainty of Ming China. Meanwhile, Lan Yu and his army inflicted much destruction to portions of the Mongol horde in the northern vicinity of the Great Wall. All whilst rice, weapons, and other supplies were transported across the Great Wall into Manchuria for the Ming army.

Naghachu and his Mongol horde surrendered to the Ming army. Dreyer (1982) stated that this was on 14 July 1387, while Langlois (1998) stated that this was in October 1387. The lesser Mongol chieftains regarded Naghachu's surrender as a defection and continued resisting. While the Ming army was returning to the Great Wall, the rear guard was ambushed and suffered losses, including Chief Commissioner Pu Ying (濮英), who was the commander of the rear guard.

== Aftermath ==
The campaign concluded with the capture of Naghachu and his horde, their families, and their domesticated animals. Naghachu, his 6,500 officers, and their families were sent to Nanjing. In the period after his surrender to the Ming, Naghachu was given a marquisate with a stipend of 2,000 piculs of grain, an estate of public fields in Jiangxi, and a mansion in Nanjing. He ultimately died (probably due to his excessive alcohol consumption) near Wu-ch'ang on 31 August 1388 and was buried outside Nanjing.

Bolstered by this successful campaign, the Hongwu Emperor ordered Lan Yu to lead 150,000 men on a military campaign against Toghus Temur, the Mongol Khan, culminating in the Ming victory over the Mongol horde at the Battle of Buir Lake in 1388.

Zhu Quan, Prince of Ning, would be stationed at Daning and take command of the four fortresses.

== See also ==
- Ming dynasty in Inner Asia
