= Feng Sheng (general) =

Chinese general (1330–1395)

- 馮勝
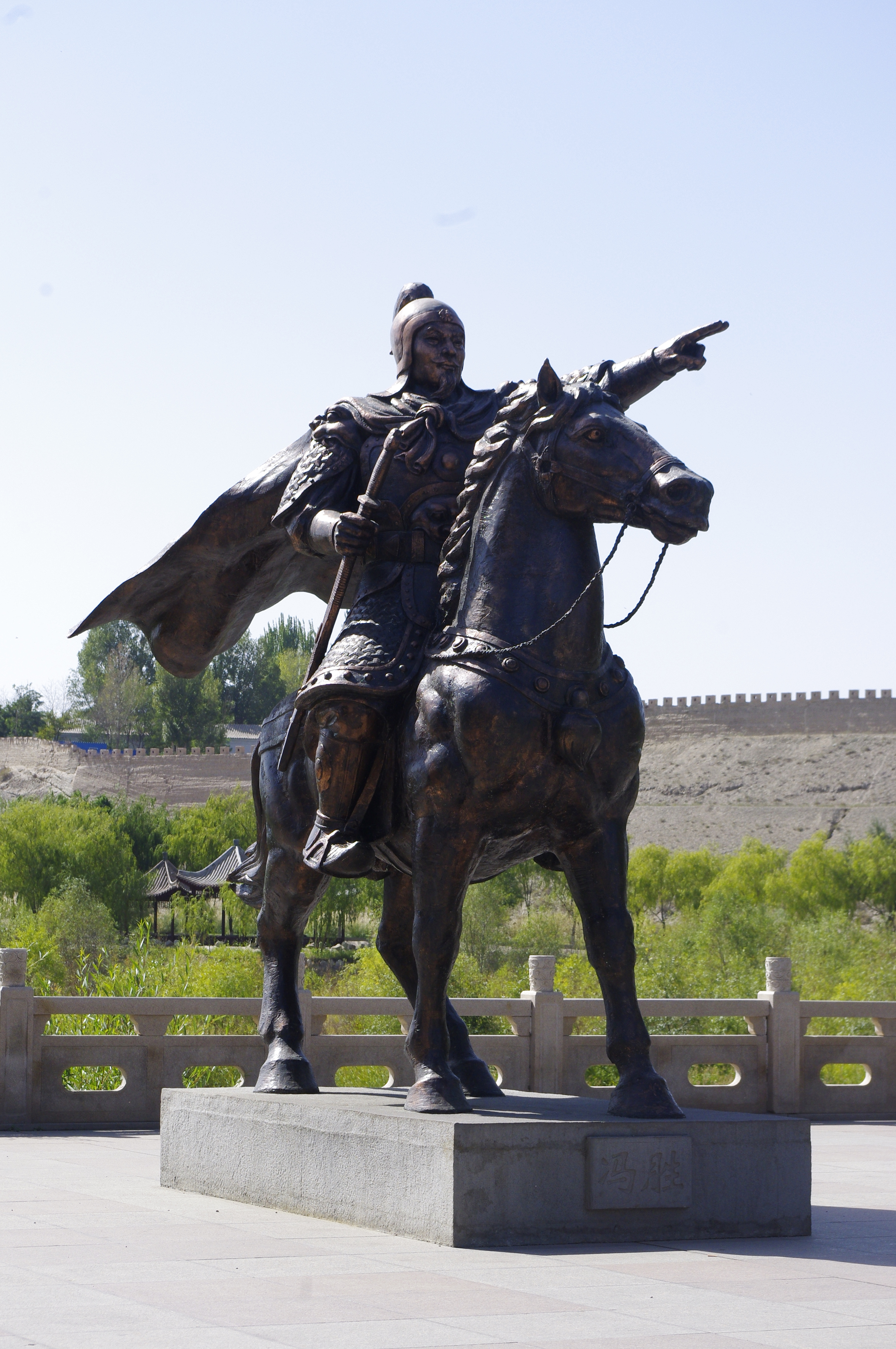
- Statue of Feng Sheng at Jiayu Pass

Personal details
- Born: Feng Guosheng; 1330 Dingyuan County, Anhui
- Died: 22 February 1395 (aged 64–65) Nanjing
- Occupation: General
- Other names: Feng Zongyi
- Title: Duke of Song (Note: Simplified Chinese: 宋国公; traditional Chinese: 宋國公; pinyin: Sòng Guógōng); Prince of Ningling (Note: Simplified Chinese: 宁陵王; traditional Chinese: 寧陵王; pinyin: Nínglíng Wáng) (posthumously)
- Posthumous name: Wuzhuang (Note: Simplified Chinese: 武壮; traditional Chinese: 武壯; pinyin: Wǔzhuàng)

Chinese name
- Traditional Chinese: 馮勝
- Simplified Chinese: 冯胜
Transcriptions
Standard Mandarin
- Hanyu Pinyin: Féng Shèng

Feng Sheng (1330 – 22 February 1395) was a Chinese general who served under the Hongwu Emperor, the founding emperor of the Ming dynasty. He was one of the most prominent Ming generals, receiving the title of Duke of Song in 1370. In 1387, he led a successful campaign in Manchuria, but was later removed from his commanding post and lived in disgrace. He died under unclear circumstances in early 1395.

== Biography ==
Feng Sheng was born in 1330 in Dingyuan County, Anhui Province, eastern China, during the Mongol-led Yuan dynasty. He was originally named Feng Guosheng (馮國勝), but he also used the name Feng Zongyi (馮宗異). (Note: Some sources give his courtesy name as Zongyi.) He came from a lower middle-class family, and his brother Feng Guoyong (馮國用; 1324 – 13 May 1359) was an educated literati. When the Red Turban Rebellion broke out against Yuan rule in 1351 and rebel activity spread near their home, the Feng brothers joined a group of local people who went into hiding in the mountains. Feng Guoyong became the group's leader, while Feng Guosheng was known for his exceptional archery skills.

In 1354, the brothers joined Zhu Yuanzhang, one of the rebel leaders. Both brothers played prominent roles in the fighting; Feng Guoyong commanded a division of Zhu's bodyguard. In 1359, he died during a campaign in eastern Zhejiang. (Note: After his death, he was posthumously granted the title of Duke of Zeng in 1369.) Feng Guosheng took command after his brother's death. In 1360, he distinguished himself in battles against the troops of Chen Youliang, the emperor of the rebel state of Han who controlled the area around the middle course of the Yangtze River. Over the next few years, he rose to become the second most important general in Zhu's army, after Xu Da. In 1367, as commissioner of the Central Military Commission and commander of the bodyguard, he played a key role in the arrest and trial of Zhang Chang (張昶), a former Yuan official accused of treason. Feng ranked fourth in terms of rewards for his contributions to the conquest of Zhang Shicheng's state of Wu (located in present-day Zhejiang) in 1366–1367. In 1368, Zhu Yuanzhang proclaimed himself emperor of the Ming dynasty in Nanjing and became known as the Hongwu Emperor. To avoid the naming taboo associated with the Emperor's courtesy name Guorui (國瑞), Feng removed the character Guo (國) from his name, becoming known as Feng Sheng.

In the 1368 campaign into northern China against Yuan forces, Feng served under the command of Xu Da and Chang Yuchun. In the summer of 1368, the Emperor appointed Feng as the commander of Kaifeng, the center of Henan province. Kaifeng was not only a transportation hub, but also a crucial military garrison for operations in the north and northwest. He resided there for two decades. He played a significant role in the conquest of Shanxi in 1368, as well as the battles in Shaanxi in 1369 and the campaigns to Mongolia in 1370 and 1372.

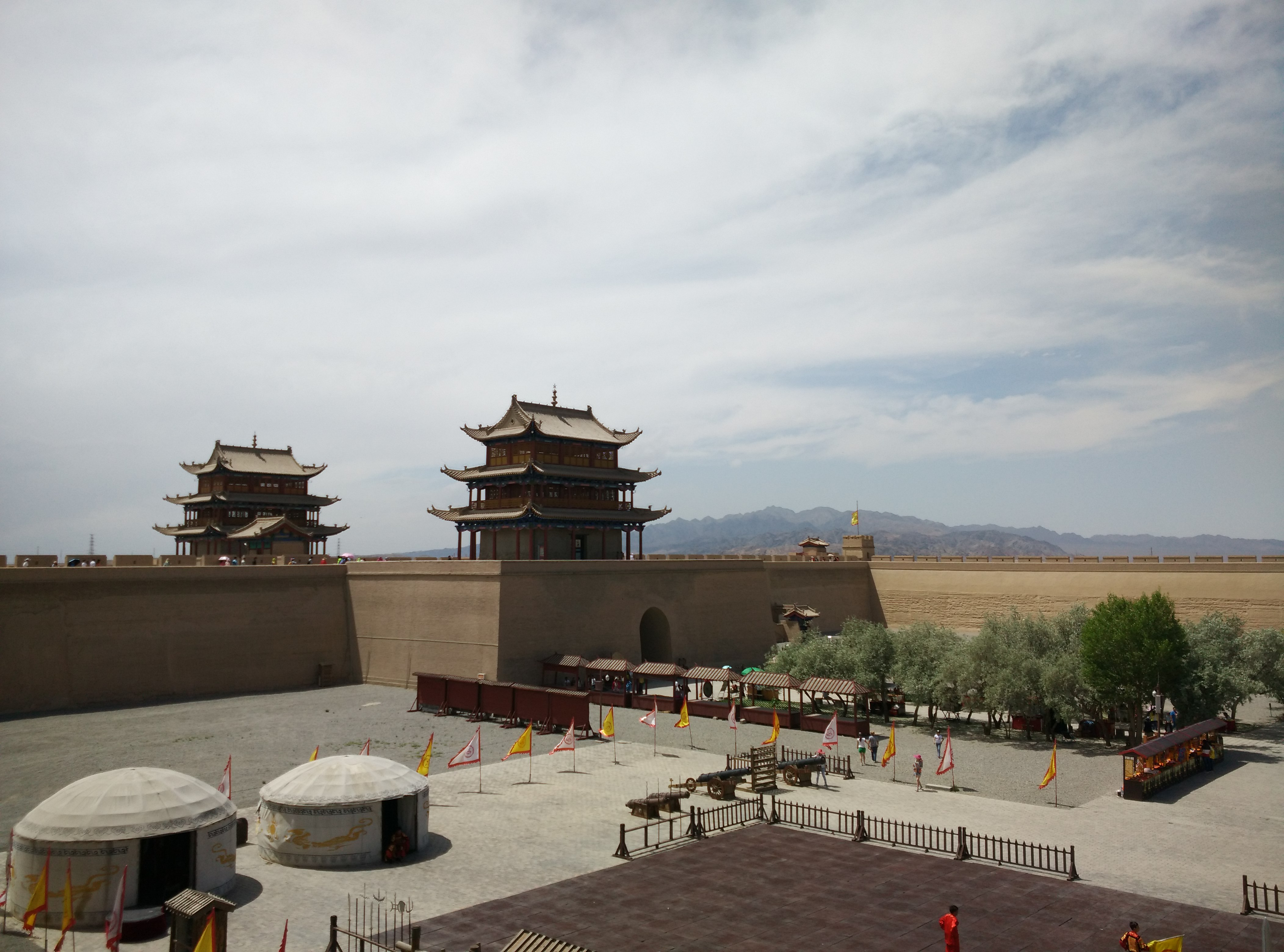
The Jiayu Pass fortress, built in 1372 after Feng Sheng's conquest of Hexi

During the 1372 campaign against the Mongols, Feng Sheng was assigned to conquer the Hexi Corridor, a key passage along the Silk Road, while Xu Da and the Emperor's nephew Li Wenzhong (李文忠) were tasked with attacking the Mongol heartland and Manchuria. Although Feng's forces successfully completed their mission, the Mongols defeated Xu and Li's armies. After conquering Hexi, Feng recognized the strategic importance of Jiayu Pass and established it as the frontier, abandoning Dunhuang as a forward position. He secured the Hexi Corridor by constructing passes and earthen fortifications and stationing troops there, laying the foundations for the Ming's defense of the region.

In 1369, Feng's daughter married the Hongwu Emperor's fifth son, Zhu Su, Prince of Zhou. Zhu Su's residence in Kaifeng was under Feng's control. In November 1370, the Emperor granted titles to 30 generals. Feng was one of six generals who received the title of duke; he was created the Duke of Song (Song Guogong; 宋國公).

In 1386, the Emperor appointed Feng as commander of the campaign against Naghachu, (Note: Following the deaths of Li Wenzhong (1384) and Xu Da (1385), and with Chang Yuchun and Deng Yu long dead, the surviving dukes among the 1370 nobility included Li Shanchang, who had never held a field command, Tang He, who was overseeing coastal defenses against the Japanese, and Feng Sheng. Although Lan Yu and Fu Youde had risen to noble rank through more recent victories, Feng was the senior-most noble available for field command.) the highest-ranking Mongol general in Manchuria. Feng was supported by his deputies, Fu Youde and Lan Yu. In March 1387, with an army of two hundred thousand soldiers, he led a campaign north of the Great Wall. His troops built four forts in southern Jehol before continuing eastward. On 7 July 1387, the Mongols ambushed and defeated a separate Ming division, killing its commander, Chen Yong (陳鏞), Marquis of Linjiang. Seven days later, after crossing the Liao River, Feng caught up with Naghachu, defeated him, and brought him back to China as a captive. Feng's son-in-law Pu Ying (濮英) was the commander of the rear guard, and he was killed on the return march when the Mongols caused significant damage to his forces. Chang Yuchun's son Chang Mao (常茂), who was married to Feng's daughter, accused Feng of taking the best captured horses for himself and being responsible for the failures of the retreat. On 8 September 1387, the Emperor relieved Feng of his command and stripped him of his fief in Henan. He was sent to Fengyang in disgrace, (Note: When Zhu Su secretly visited Feng in Fengyang in late 1389, the Emperor ordered his exile to Yunnan but instead placed him under house arrest in Nanjing.) while Lan took over his army. The Emperor exiled Chang by the end of the year.

From 1388 to 1392, Feng was assigned relatively minor duties, including escorting Mongol troops from Shandong to Yunnan in 1388 and serving as an inspector of several guards in Shaanxi from 1391 to 1392. In 1393, he spent time at court with Fu Youde, possibly as witnesses to the execution of 20,000 people involved in Lan Yu's case. After this, both Feng and Fu served in Beijing under the Emperor's fourth son, Zhu Di, Prince of Yan.

Feng died in February 1395 shortly after returning to Nanjing. All nine of his sons had also predeceased him, resulting in the extinction of the title of Duke of Song. Fu died in December 1394, just a few weeks earlier. The circumstances surrounding the two generals' deaths are unclear, with some sources claiming suicide and others suggesting execution. After Zhu Di seized power, he extensively rewrote Veritable Records of Emperor Taizu, the official history of his father's reign, and since both men had last served under him in Beijing, their deaths may have been connected to him. In 1644, the Hongguang Emperor of the Southern Ming posthumously granted Feng Sheng the title of Prince of Ningling (寧陵王) with the posthumous name Wuzhuang (武壯).
