= Basalawarmi =

Yuan dynasty prince and loyalist (died 1382)

Basalawarmi Басалаварми

Prince of Liang
- Reign: ?–1382
- Predecessor: Bolot
- Successor: Position abolished
- Born: Unknown
- Died: January 6, 1382
- House: Borjigin
- Father: Bolot

Basalawarmi (Middle Mongolian: ᠪᠠᠵᠠᠯᠠᠸᠠᠷᠮᠠᠢ, Chinese: 把匝剌瓦爾密, died January 6, 1382), commonly known by his hereditary noble title, the Prince of Liang, was a Yuan dynasty prince and loyalist who fought against the Ming dynasty. He was a descendant of Khökhechi, the fifth son of Kublai Khan. After the Ming took over Yunnan, the Hongwu Emperor exiled Basalawarmi's family to Korea.

== Before the fall of the Yuan ==
Before the Yuan dynasty's fall in 1368, Basalawarmi had been the Yuan Viceroy of Yunnan in southwestern China. He held the title of Prince of Liang, a hereditary title passed down from one of his forebears, a son of Kublai Khan. Following the Ming dynasty's overthrow of the Yuan, Basalawarmi, from his capital city of Kunming, led one of the last pockets of Yuan resistance to Ming rule. He was able to withstand the advance of other forces of his time due to the relatively remote location of his domain. Meanwhile, the Hongwu Emperor, the founding emperor of the Ming dynasty, decided to approach Basalawarmi with an overture of peace, believing that conquering a remote region with force would be a costly action.

The connection between Basalawarmi and the remnant Yuan forces was limited but not terminated. Ayusiridara Khan dispatched a messenger to Basalawarmi in order to confirm his sovereignty over Yunnan. Despite the fact that Basalawarmi was truly loyal to the falling Yuan dynasty, Yunnan was independent of any external political forces during the reign of Basalawarmi.

The King of Dali Duan Gong was married to the Borjigin princess Agai, daughter of the Prince of Liang, Basalawarmi. They had a son and a daughter, Duan Sengnu. their children were also called Duan Qiangna and Duan Bao. Duan Sengnu raised Duan Bao to take revenge against Basalawarmi for the killing of Duan Gong. A play was made based on these events. According to Yuan documents, the Duan family were originally ethnic Han from Wuwei commandery, Gansu. Other Duan families also originated from Wuwei.

== Defeat and death ==
The Hongwu Emperor initially sent a diplomat, Wang Wei, to attempt to negotiate with Basalawarmi in 1372, but Basalawarmi executed Wang Wei in 1374 after negotiations broke down. The Hongwu Emperor then dispatched the generals Fu Youde and Ma Hua to deal with Basalawarmi. In 1381, Ma Hua attacked Basalawarmi from Guiyang while Fu Youde's deputies, Mu Ying and Lan Yu, attacked from another direction. The combined Ming forces, which numbered 300,000 men, met Basalawarmi's 100,000 units. Basalawarmi's forces were decisively defeated. Following his defeat, Basalawarmi drowned his wife, ordered his ministers to commit suicide, and committed suicide himself on January 6, 1382.

After his death, his family was exiled to the state of Tamna (modern-day Jeju Island, South Korea) according to the edict of the Hongwu Emperor.

== Mythical account ==
In The Deer and the Cauldron, a novel written by Jin Yong, the main character retells a humorous mythical account of Basalawarmi's defeat. In this legend, Basalawarmi is said to have hundreds of war elephants, obtained from what is now Myanmar, in his army. The Ming general Ma Hua defeats Basalawarmi by unleashing ten thousand mice which drive Basalawarmi's war elephants to terror, alluding to the widespread myth that elephants are afraid of mice. Basalawarmi himself is not presented favorably; he is described as a drunken, fat, and cowardly old man.

== See also ==
- Khatso, Mongols who remained in Yunnan after the death of Basalawarmi.
