= Mu Ying =

Chinese general (1345–1392)

- 沐英

Marquis of Xiping
- In office 1377–1392
- Succeeded by: Mu Chun

Personal details
- Born: 1345 Dingyuan County, Hao Prefecture, Henan, Yuan China (modern Dingyuan County, Chuzhou, Anhui)
- Died: 1392 (aged 47) Yunnan Fu, Yunnan, Ming China (modern Kunming, Yunnan)
- Children: Mu Chun; Mu Sheng; Mu Ang; Mu Xin
- Parent(s): Mu Chao (father); Lady Gu; Hongwu Emperor (adoptive father)
- Occupation: Military general, politician
- Courtesy name: Wenying (文英)
- Posthumous name: Zhaojing (昭靖)

Mu Ying
- Chinese: 沐英
Transcriptions
Standard Mandarin
- Hanyu Pinyin: Mù Yīng

Mu Ying (Chinese: 沐英; pinyin: Mù Yīng), 1345–1392) was a Chinese military general and politician during the Ming dynasty, and an adopted son of its founder, the Hongwu Emperor. He played an important role in establishing Ming authority in Yunnan.

When the Ming dynasty emerged, the Hongwu Emperor's military officers who served under him were given noble titles which privileged the holder with a stipend but in all other aspects was merely symbolic. Mu Ying's family was among them. Special rules guarding against potential abuse of power were implemented on the nobles. His family remained in Yunnan where Mu and his descendants guarded until the end of the Ming dynasty. As late as the 1650s, his descendant Mu Tianbo was one of the main supporters of the Yongli Emperor, the last emperor of the Southern Ming, and accompanied the fugitive emperor all the way into Toungoo Burma.

== Family ==
Consort and issue(s):

- Lady Zhaojing of Qianning, of the Feng clan (黔宁昭靖王夫人冯氏)
  - Mu Chun, Marquis of Xiping (西平侯沐春, d. 1399), first son
- Lady Zhaojing of Qianning, of the Geng clan (黔宁昭靖王继夫人耿氏, 1344-1431)
  - Mu Sheng, Duke of Qian (黔國公 沐晟, 1368 – 1449), second son
- Lady Baosheng, of the Fang clan (鲍生夫人方氏, 1357 – 1439)
  - Mu Ang, Count of Dingbian (定边伯 沐昂, d. 1445), fifth son
- Lady Gaoming, of the Yan clan (诰命夫人颜氏, d.1448)
  - Mu Xin, Marquis of Xiping (西平侯 沐昕), fourth son
- Unknown:
  - Mu Chang (沐昶), third son
  - Lady Mu (沐氏), 1st daughter
    - Married Dai Yu (戴玉)
  - Lady Mu (沐氏), 2nd daughter
    - Married 3rd son of Xu Da, Xu Zengshou, Duke of Ding
  - Lady Mu (沐氏), 3rd daughter
    - Married Sun Yi (孙毅)
  - Lady Mu (沐氏), 4th daughter
    - Married Zhou Zhong (朔州)

== Ethnicity ==
In his The References of History of Islam in China, Bai Shouyi explained that he failed to find any reliable proof of Mu Ying was a Hui Chinese. Thus, "it sounded unconvincing" to "identify him as one of Hui people". However, later, the biography of Mu was included in A History of the Chinese Hui People (中国回回民族史), which was edited by Bai without further evidence.

Michael Dillon wrote that "There is no suggestion in most western accounts of Mu Ying's career or the Chinese sources on which they draw that Mu Ying was anything other than a Han Chinese by origin, yet he has been included in the major series of studies of the lives of eminent Hui as a Muslim without any comment. The surname Mu is also common among Chinese Muslims and is probably derived from Muhammad, although it is normally written with a different Chinese character. The character used to write Mu Ying's surname is the one associated with washing the hair and which appears on signs in every mosque in China as the first character of muyu the ritual baths to be used before prayer." He concludes that "He was probably descended from an old Muslim family but there is no evidence that he was a practising Muslim."

Jonathan Neaman Lipman notes that Mu Ying is among a number of generals "unambiguously claimed as Muslim by Sino-Muslim scholars" mentioning specifically Bai Shouyi. He writes that "There is considerable doubt among non-Muslim scholars as to the “Muslim” identity of most of these generals, but Sino-Muslims assert their “Huiness” unequivocally. Tazaka, Chugoku ni okeru kaikyo, 861, for example, questions not only Chang Yuqun’s identification as a Huihui but that of many others as well. F. Mote, in Goodrich and Fang, Dictionary, 1079–83, indicates that we have no evidence that Mu Ying was born a Muslim, and the story of his adoption and upbringing in Zhu Yuanzhang’s intimate circle certainly indicates that he was not raised as one."

However, other authors such as Li Qingsheng have pointed out his dietary practices of eating only lamb meat, his Muslim wife, and his construction of a mosque in Xining as examples of his identification with Islam. Moreover, many Muslims flocked to Yunnan during Mu's administration there.

== Popular culture ==
The descendants of Mu Ying are featured in Louis Cha's Wuxia novel The Deer and the Cauldron, set in the early Qing dynasty. The Mu Prince Residence based in Yunnan is a pro-Ming secret organisation that houses the descendants of Mu Ying and his followers. Mu Jianping of the seven wives of Wei Xiaobao (the protagonist), and her brother Mu Jiansheng, are direct descendants of Mu Ying.

== See also ==
- Ming conquest of Yunnan
- Yunnan under Ming rule

Mu Ying House of Duke of Qian Born: 1345 Died: 1392
Chinese nobility
Preceded by Title created	Marquis of Xiping; 1377–1392	Succeeded by Mu Chun
