= Naghachu =

Mongolian commander of the Yuan

Naghachu (ᠨᠠᠭᠠᠴᠦ Mongolian: Naγaču; Chinese: 納哈出; d. 31 August 1388), also written as Nahacu, was an ethnic Mongol leader and general of the Northern Yuan in Manchuria, which was under Liaoyang province of the former Yuan dynasty.

Originally a Yuan official, Naghachu had won hegemony over the Mongol tribes in a wide area including much of Rehe and Liaoning by the mid-1380s. His influence became strong in the northeast, with forces large enough (numbering hundreds of thousands) to threaten invasion of the newly founded Ming dynasty in order to restore the Mongols to power in China proper. Instead of waiting for the Northern Yuan to attack, in 1387 the Ming sent a military campaign to attack Naghachu and forced his surrender after successful diplomacy. Naghachu and thousands of his officers and relatives were sent to Nanjing, the capital of the Ming dynasty at that time. The Ming granted Naghachu himself a marquisate with a stipend of 2,000 piculs of grain, estate of public fields in Jiangxi, and a mansion in Nanjing. He died near Wuchang on 31 August 1388, probably from overindulgence in alcohol, and was buried outside Nanjing.

== See also ==
- Manchuria under Yuan rule
- Ming campaign against the Uriankhai
