= Zhu Zhen =

Zhu Zhen may refer to:

- Zhu Youzhen (888–923), last emperor of the Later Liang, known as Zhu Zhen during his reign
- Zhu Zhen (Ming dynasty) (1364–1424), sixth son of the Hongwu Emperor
