= Prince of Chu (Ming dynasty) =

The Prince of Chu (Chinese: 楚王) was a princely peerage of the Chinese Ming dynasty. It was created in 1370 for Zhu Zhen, the Hongwu Emperor's sixth son by Consort Chong of the Hu clan. Initially the peerage was named the Prince of Qi (Chinese: 齊王), but the name was changed to Chu after the pre-Qin state that used to encompass Wuchang, which was conquered at the time of Zhu Zhen's birth.

== Generation poem ==
The generation poem given by the Hongwu Emperor was:

孟季均荣显，英华蕴盛容。宏才升博衍，茂士立全功.

Meng Ji Yun Rong Xian, Ying Hua Yun Sheng Rong. Hong Cai Sheng Bo Yan, Mao Shi Li Quan Gong.

The peerage was used until Sheng generation which was the same generation as of Taichang Emperor

Generation	Kangxi Radical	Wu Xing element
Meng (孟)	Radical 86 (火)	"fire" (火)
Ji (季)	Radical 32 (土)	"Earth" (土)
Jun (均)	Radical 167 (金)	"Metal" (金)
Rong (荣)	Radical 85 (水)	"Water" (水)
Xian (显)	Radical 75 (木), Radical 9 (人)	"Tree" (木)
Ying (英)	Radical 86 (火), Radical	"fire" (火)
Hua (华)	Radical 32 (土), Radical 54 (广)	"Earth" (土)
Yun (蕴)	Radical 167 (金)	"Metal" (金)
Sheng (盛)	Radical 85 (水)	"Water" (水)
Rong (容)	Radical 75 (木)	"Tree" (木)
Hong (宏)	Radical 86 (火)	"fire" (火)
Cai (才)	Radical 32 (土)	"Earth" (土)
Sheng (升)	Radical 167 (金)	"Metal" (金)
Bo (博)	Radical 85 (水)	"Water" (水)
Yan (衍)	Radical 75 (木)	"Tree" (木)
Mao (茂)	Radical 86 (火)	"fire" (火)
Shi (士)	Radical 32 (土)	"Earth" (土)
Li (立)	Radical 167 (金)	"Metal" (金)
Quan (全)	Radical 85 (水)	"Water" (水)
Gong (功)	Radical 75 (木)	"Tree" (木)

== Princedom of Chu ==
- Zhu Zhen (朱桢; 5 April 1364 - 22 March 1424) (1st), Zhu Yuanzhang's sixth son who was granted the princedom in 1370 as Prince of Qi (齐王), then had his peerage renamed to Prince of Chu (楚王) and held the princedom of Chu until 1424 and was posthumously honoured as Prince Zhao of Chu (楚昭王)
  - Zhu Mengwan (朱孟烷; 1382 - 1439) (2nd), Zhu Zhen's third son who held the princedom from 1424 to 1439 and was posthumously honoured as Prince Zhuang of Chu (楚庄王)
    - Zhu Jini (朱季堄; 1413 - 1443) (3rd), Zhu Mengwan's first son who held the princedom from 1440 to 1443 and was posthumously honoured as Prince Xian of Chu (楚宪王)
    - Zhu Jichu (朱季埱; 1423 -1462) (4th), Zhu Mengwan's second son who held the princedom from 1444 to 1462 and was posthumously honoured as Prince Kang of Chu (楚康王)
    - Zhu Jili (朱季塛; 1426 - 18 October 1462), Zhu Mengwan's third son who had held the princedom of Dong'an from 1437 to 1462 before his son was transferred into the princedom of Chu
      - Zhu Jun'e (朱均鈋; 1450–1510) (5th), Zhu Jili's first son who held the princedom from 1465 to 1510 and was posthumously honoured as Prince Jing of Chu (楚靖王)
        - Zhu Rongxie (朱荣㳦; 1474 - 1534) (6th), Zhu Jun'e's first son who held the princedom from 1512 to 1534 and was posthumously honoured as Prince Duan of Chu (楚端王)
          - Zhu Xianrong (朱显榕; 1506 - 30 January 1545) (7th), Zhu Rongxie's first son who held the princedom from 1536 to 1545 and was posthumously honoured as Prince Min of Chu (楚愍王)
            - Zhu Yingxian (朱英𤈷; 1541 - 1571) (8th), Zhu Xianrong's third son who held the princedom from 1551 to 1571 and was posthumously honoured as Prince Gong of Chu (楚恭王)
              - Zhu Huakui (朱华奎; 1571 - 1643) (9th), Zhu Yingxian's first son who held the princedom from 1580 to 1643 and was posthumously honoured as Prince Ding of Chu (楚定王)
              - Zhu Huabi (朱华壁; 1571 - 1646) (10th), Zhu Yingxian's second son who held the princedom from 1643 to 1646 and was posthumously honoured as Princed Zhen of Chu (楚贞王)
              - Zhu Huadie (朱华堞; 1571 - 1649) (11th), Zhu Yingxian's third son who held the princedom from 1646 to 1649 and was not given any posthumous name (楚王)
              - Zhu Huachan (朱华廛; 1571) (12th), Zhu Yingxian's fourth son who inherited the princedom in 1649
          - Zhu Xianhuai (朱显槐; d. 1590), Zhu Rongxie's third son who acted as clan councillor from 1571 to 1574 and held the title of Prince of Wugang
        - Zhu Rongshu (朱荣淑), Zhu Junbu's son who held the title of Prince of Dong'an
          - Zhu Xianhun (朱显梡, d. 1587), Zhu Rongshu's first surviving son who acted as clan councillor from 1574 to 1580

== Cadet lines ==
=== Prince of Yong'an ===
- Zhu Mengjiong (朱孟炯; 12 May 1382 - 1432), Zhu Zhen's second son who held the princedom from 1399 to 1432 and was posthumously honoured as Prince Yijian of Yong'an (永安懿简王)
  - Zhu Jishu (朱季塾; 1409 - 1468), Zhu Mengjiong's second son who held the princedom from 1437 to 1468 and was posthumously honoured as Prince Zhuanghui of Yong'an (永安庄惠王)
    - Zhu Junli (朱均𨫊; d. 1467), Zhu Jishu's first son who held the title of chief son from 1445 to 1467 and was posthumously honoured as Prince Daohuai of Yong'an (永安悼怀王)
      - Zhu Rongdan (朱荣澹, d. 1520), Zhu Junli's first son who held the princedom from 1472 to 1520 and was posthumously honoured as Prince Jingyi of Yong'an (永安靖懿王)
        - Zhu Xianwu (朱显梧, d. 1527), Zhu Rongdan's first son who held the princedom 1527 and was posthumously honoured as Prince Zhaoding of Yong'an (永安昭定王)
          - Zhu Yingjun (朱英焌, d. 1575), Zhu Xianwu's first son who held the princedom from 1549 until 1575 and was posthumously honoured as Prince Gongshun of Yong'an (永安恭顺王)
            - Zhu Huamo (朱华𡊉), Zhu Yingjun's first son who held the princedom from 1575 and was posthumously honoured as Prince Ronghui of Yong'an (永安荣惠王)
              - Zhu Yunzhong (朱蕴钟), Zhu Huamo's first son who held the princedom in 1576 and was not given any posthumous name
                - Zhu Shengrong (朱盛溶, d. 1593), Zhu Yunzhong's son who held the title of chief son and was posthumously granted princely title
                  - Zhu Rongxi (朱容析, d. 1643), Zhu Shengrong's first son who held the princedom from 1610 to 1643 and was not given posthumous name
            - Zhu Huaruan (朱华堧), Zhu Yingjun's son who held the princedom from 1643 until 1656 when he surrendered to Qing dynasty.

=== Prince of Shouchang ===
- Zhu Mengchao (朱孟焯; 1383- 1440), Zhu Zhen's fourth son who held the princedom from 1399 to 1440 and was posthumously honoured as Prince Anxi of Shouchang (寿昌安僖王)
  - Zhu Jixu (朱季圩; 1438-1502), Zhu Mengchao's second son who held the princedom from 1449 to 1502 and was posthumously honoured as Prince Jinghe of Shouchang (寿昌靖和王)
    - Zhu Juntie (朱均铁; d.1510), Zhu Jixu's son who held the princedom from 1505 to 1510 and was posthumously honoured as Prince Zhuangmu of Shouchang (寿昌庄穆王)

=== Prince of Chongyang ===
- Zhu Mengwei (朱孟炜; 10 April 1387 - 1448), Zhu Zhen's fifth son who held the princedom from 1404 to 1448 and was posthumously honoured as Prince Jingjian of Chongyang (崇阳靖简王)
  - Zhu Jidie (朱季堞; 1408-1454), Zhu Mengwei's first son who held the princedom from 1451 to 1454 and was posthumously honoured as Prince Zhuangxi of Chongyang (崇阳庄僖王)
    - Zhu Jundun (朱均镦; 1443-1506), Zhu Jidie's first son who held the princedom from 1455 to 1506 and was posthumously honoured as Prince Duanyi of Chongyang (崇阳端懿王)
      - Zhu Rongluo (朱荣𤄷; 1468-1506), Zhu Jundun's second son who held the title of chief son from 1493 until 1506 and was posthumously honoured as Prince Duanyin of Chongyang (崇阳端隐王)
        - Zhu Xianxiu (朱显休; 1507 - 1549), Zhu Rongluo's first son who held the princedom from 1522 to 1549 and was not given a posthumous name (崇阳王)
          - Zhu Yingshu (朱英㷂), Zhu Xianxiu's son who held the title of clan councillor from 1552
            - Zhu HuaX
              - Zhu Yunqian (朱蕴钤; d. 1657), Zhu Xianxiu's successor who held the princedom from 1645 to 1657 when he surrendered to Qing dynasty.

=== Prince of Tongshan ===
- Zhu Mengyue (朱孟爚; 12 February 1388 - 1444), Zhu Zhen's sixth son who held the princedom from 1404 to 1444 and was posthumously honoured as Prince Jinggong of Tongshan (通山靖恭王)
  - Zhu Jiyang (朱季垟; 1407 - 1470), Zhu Mengyue's first son who held the princedom from 1447 to 1470 and was posthumously honoured as Prince Zhuangjian of Tongshan (通山庄简王)
    - Zhu Junse (朱均鏼; d. 1445), Zhu Jiyang's first son who held the title of chief son in 1445 and was posthumously honoured as Prince Wenhui of Tongshan (通山温惠王)
      - Zhu Ronghao (朱荣濠, d. 1516), Zhu Junse's first son who held the princedom from 1473 to 1516 and was posthumously honoured as Prince Wending of Tongshan (通山温定王)
        - Zhu Xianyu (朱显楀, d. 1539), Zhu Ronghao's first son who held the princedom from 1521 to 1539 and was posthumously honoured as Prince Duanmu of Tongshan (通山温穆王)
          - Zhu Yingchui (朱英炊, d. 1579), Zhu Xianyu's first son who held the princedom from 1543 to 1579 and was posthumously honoured as Prince Zhuangyi of Tongshan (通山庄懿王)
            - Zhu Hualang (朱华埌, d.1559), Zhu Yingchui's first son who held the title of heir apparent from 1544 to 1559 and was posthumously honoured as Prince Rongdao of Tongshan (通山荣悼王)
              - Zhu Yunxuan (朱蕴铉, d.1603), Zhu Hualang's first son who held the princedom from 1581 to 1603 and was posthumously honoured as Prince Gongxian of Tongshan (通山恭宪王)
                - Zhu Shengying (朱盛渶, d. 1611), Zhu Yunxuan's first son who held the princedom from 1603 to 1611 and was not given any posthumous name
                  - Zhu Rongrui (朱容枘, d. 1645), Zhu Shengying's first son who held the princedom from 1611 to 1645 when he was killed by Zhang Xianzhong
              - Zhu Yunyue (朱蕴钺, d.1645), Zhu Hualang's second son who held the princedom in 1645 (通山王)
              - Zhu Yunshu (朱蕴𨥤, d. 1662), Zhu Hualang's third son who held the princedom from 1645 to 1662 (通山王)

=== Prince of Tongcheng ===
- Zhu Mengcan (朱孟灿; 6 October 1389 - 1455), Zhu Zhen's seventh son who held the princedom from 1404 to 1455 and was posthumously honoured as Prince Zhuangjing of Tongcheng (通城庄靖王)
  - Zhu JiX (朱季X; 1413 - 1483), Zhu Mengcan's first son who held the princedom from 1457 to 1483 and was posthumously honoured as Prince Rongshun of Tongcheng (通城荣顺王)
    - Zhu Junzhuo (朱均镯), Zhu JiX's son who held a title of bulwark general until his death and was posthumously honoured as Prince Ximu of Tongcheng (通城僖穆王)
      - Zhu Rongdu (朱荣渡, 1450-1521), Zhu Junzhuo's son who held the princedom from 1487 to 1521 and was posthumously honoured as Prince Wenhui of Tongcheng (通城温惠王)
        - Zhu Xiangui (朱显柜), Zhu Rongdu's first son who held the title of heir son and was posthumously honoured as Prine Huaijian of Tongcheng (通城怀简王)
          - Zhu Yinghu (朱英焀, d. before 1576), Zhu Xiangui's first son who held the princedom from 1524 until 1576 and was not given posthumous name (通城王)
            - Zhu Huashi (朱华埘), Zhu Yinghu's first son who held the princedom in 1576 and was not given posthumous name (通城王)
              - Zhu Yunqiu (朱蕴𨱇, d. 1603), Zhu Huashi's first son who held the princedom until 1603 (通城王)
                - Zhu Shengfu (朱盛浮), Zhu Yunqiu's first son who held the princedom from 1603 and was not given posthumous name (通城王)
              - Zhu Yunyan (朱蕴𨰫, d. 1648), Zhu Huashi's second son
                - Zhu Shengcheng (朱盛瀓, d. 1646), Zhu Yunyan's first son who held the princedom until 1646 when he was killed in Fuzhou
                - Zhu Shenglian (朱盛濂, d. 6 May 1654), Zhu Yunyan's second son who held the princedom from 1646 to 1654 when he died on battlefield

=== Prince of Yueyang ===
- Zhu Mengguan (朱孟爟; 15 March 1394 - 1426), Zhu Zhen's ninth son who held the princedom from 1404 to 1426 and was posthumously honoured as Prince Daohui of Yueyang (岳阳悼惠王)
  - Zhu Jijing (朱季境; 1414 - 1463), Zhu Mengguan's first son who held the princedom from 1430 to 1463 and was posthumously honoured as Prince Gongxi of Yueyang (岳阳恭僖王). As he was sonless, his princedom was expired.
  - Zhu Jichi (朱季墀), Zhu Mengguan's son who held the title of defender general (镇国将军)
    - Zhu Junhuang (朱均锽), Zhu Jichi's son who held the title of bulwark general of Yueyang (岳阳辅国将军). Appointed as head of his clan after the death of his elder uncle

=== Prince of Jiangxia ===
- Zhu Mengju (朱孟炬; 1412-1474), Zhu Zhen's tenth son who held the princedom from 1428 to 1474 and was posthumously honoured as Prince Kangjing of Jiangxia (江夏康靖王)
  - Zhu Jihao (朱季㙱; d. 1482), Zhu Mengju's first son who held the princedom from 1478 to 1482 and was posthumously honoured as Prince Daoshun of Jiangxia (江夏悼顺王)
    - Zhu Junzui (朱均鋷, d.1500), Zhu Jihao's first son who held the princedom from 1485 to 1500 and was posthumously honoured as Prince Anhui of Jiangxia (江夏安惠王)
      - Zhu Rongmo (朱荣漠, 1480s-1540s), Zhu Junzui's second son who held the princedom from 1503 to 1540s (between 1545 and 1547) and was posthumously honoured as Prince Duanxi of Jiangxia (江夏端僖王)
        - Zhu Xianju (朱显桔, d. 1583), Zhu Rongmo's first son who held the princedom from 1548 until 1583 and was posthumously honoured as Prince Zhuangding of Jiangxia (江夏庄定王)
          - Zhu Yingyi (朱英熼, d. 1589), Zhu Xianju's first son who held the princedom from 1583 to 1589 and was posthumously honoured as Prince Gongyi of Jiangxia (江夏恭懿王)
            - Zhu Huaxuan (朱华塇, d. 1611), Zhu Yingyi's first son who held the princedom from 1593 until 1611 (江夏王)
              - Zhu Yunjia (朱蕴铗, d. 1659), Zhu Huaxuan's first son who held the princedom from 1611 to 1659
              - Zhu Yunyue (朱蕴钥, d. 1664), Zhu Huaxuan's second son who held the princedom from 1659 to 1664

=== Prince of Dong'an ===
- Zhu Jili (朱季塛; 1426 - 18 October 1462), Zhu Mengwan's third son who had held the princedom of Dong'an from 1437 to 1462 and was posthumously honoured as Prince Gongding of Dong'an (东安恭定王)
  - Zhu Jun'e (朱均鈋; 1450–1510), transferred to Princedom of Chu
  - Zhu Junbu (朱均钸, d. 1508), Zhu Jili's second son who held the princedom from 1465 to 1508 and was posthumously honoured as Prince Zhaojian of Dong'an (东安昭简王)
    - Zhu Rongyin (朱荣演), Zhu Junbu's first son who was appointed as chief son of Dong'an
    - Zhu Rongshu (朱荣淑), Zhu Junbu's second son who held the princedom from 1523 to 1562 and was posthumously honoured as Prince Gongyi of Dong'an (东安恭懿王)
      - Zhu Xianhun (朱显梡, d. 1587), Zhu Rongshu's third son who held the princedom from 1567 to 1587 and was posthumously honoured as Prince Kanghui of Dong'an (东安康惠王)
        - Zhu Yingsui (朱英燧, d.1623), Zhu Xianhun's first son who held the princedom from 1596 to 1623 and was not given posthumous name (东安王)
          - Zhu Huahui (朱华𡋙), Zhu Yingsui's first son who held the princedom from 1623 and was not given posthumous name (东安王)
            - Zhu Shenglang (朱盛蒗, d. 1663), Zhu Huahui's son who held the princedom until 1663

=== Prince of Wugang ===
- Zhu Xianhuai (朱显槐, d. 1590), Zhu Rongxie's first son who held the princedom from 1537 to 1590 and was not given posthumous name (武冈王)
  - Zhu Yingyou (朱英槱, d. 1586), Zhu Xianhuai's first son who held the title of heir son in 1586 and was posthumously promoted to a Prince of Wugang (武冈王)
    - Zhu Huazeng (朱华增, d.1644), Zhu Yingyou's first son who held the princedom from 1600 to 1644 (武冈王)

== Expired cadet lines ==
=== Extinct ===
- Prince of Baling (巴陵王) - created for Zhu Mengcong (朱孟熜) in 1397
- Prince of Shouchang (寿昌王) - created for Zhu Mengchao (朱孟焯) in 1399
- Prince of Jingling (景陵王) - created for Zhu Mengzhao (朱孟炤) in 1404
- Prince of Daye (大冶王) - created for Zhu Jiruan (朱季堧) in 1444
- Prince of Jinyun (缙云王) - created for Zhu Ronglin (朱荣淋) in 1502
- Prince of Changle (长乐王) - created for Zhu Xianrong (朱显榕) in 1527
- Prince of Baokang (保康王) - created for Zhu Xianzhang (朱显樟) in 1527
- Prince of Hanyang (汉阳王) - created for Zhu Yunlong (朱蕴鑨) in 1596
- Prince of Xingguo (兴国王) - created for Zhu Yunxian (朱蕴铣)

=== Abolished ===
- Prince of Chongyang (崇阳王) - created for Zhu Mengwei (朱孟炜) in 1404 and abolished with the suicide of Zhu Xianxiu (朱显休) in 1549
- Prince of Yueyang (岳阳王) - created for Zhu Mengguan (朱孟爟) in 1404 and abolished with the death of Zhu Jijing (朱季境) in 1463.

=== Absorbed into princedom ===
- Prince of Wuling (武陵王) - created for Zhu Jini (朱季堄) in 1428
- Prince of Qianyang (黔阳王) - created for Zhu Jichu (朱季埱) in 1437
- Prince of Xuanhua (宣化王) - created for Zhu Huabi (朱华壁) in 1581 and expired after Zhu Huabi inherited the princedom
- Prince of Xin'an (新安王) - created for Zhu Huadie (朱华堞) in 1646
