= Zhu Mengwan =

Chinese prince (1382–1439)

Zhu Mengwan 朱孟烷
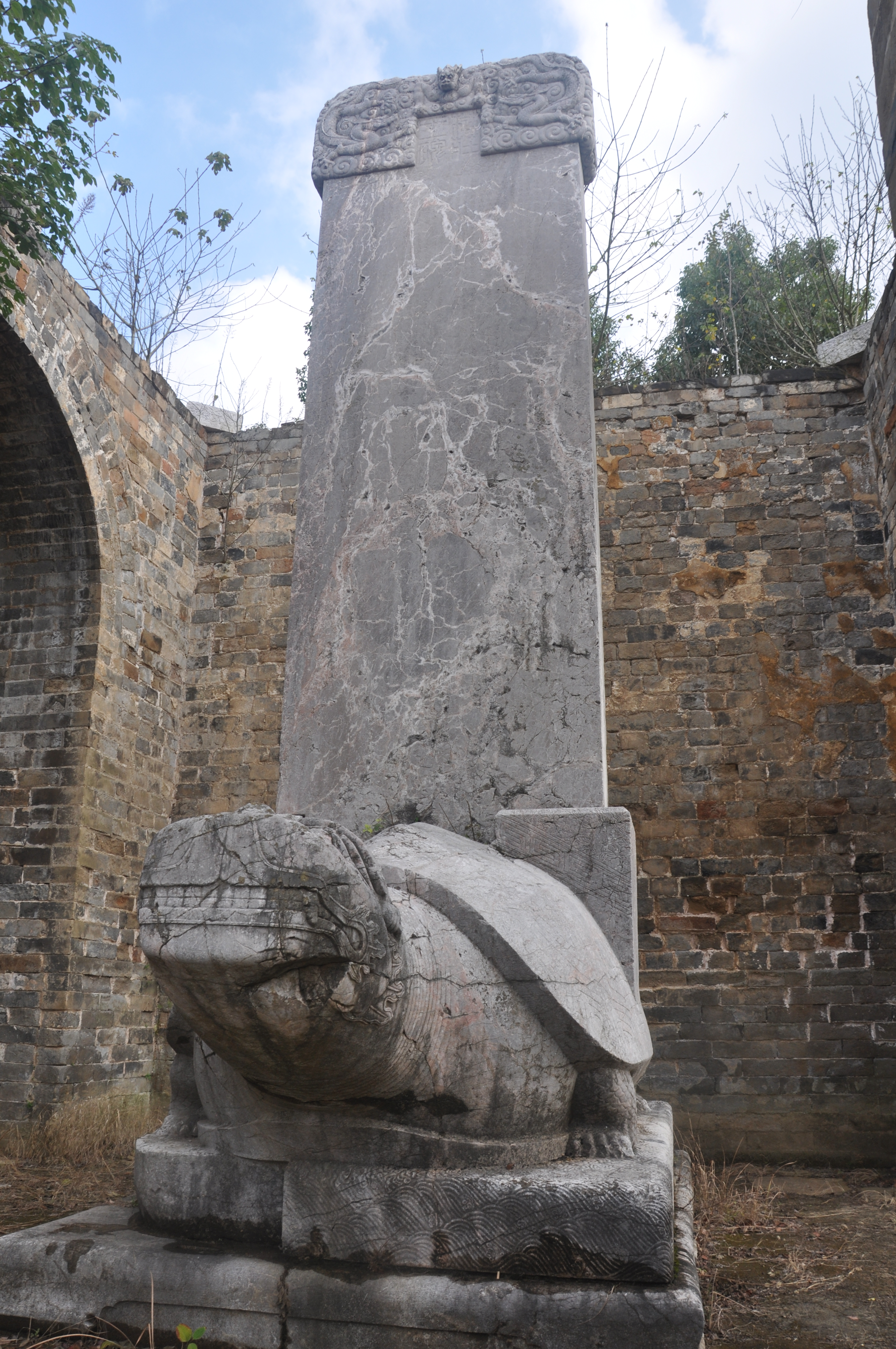
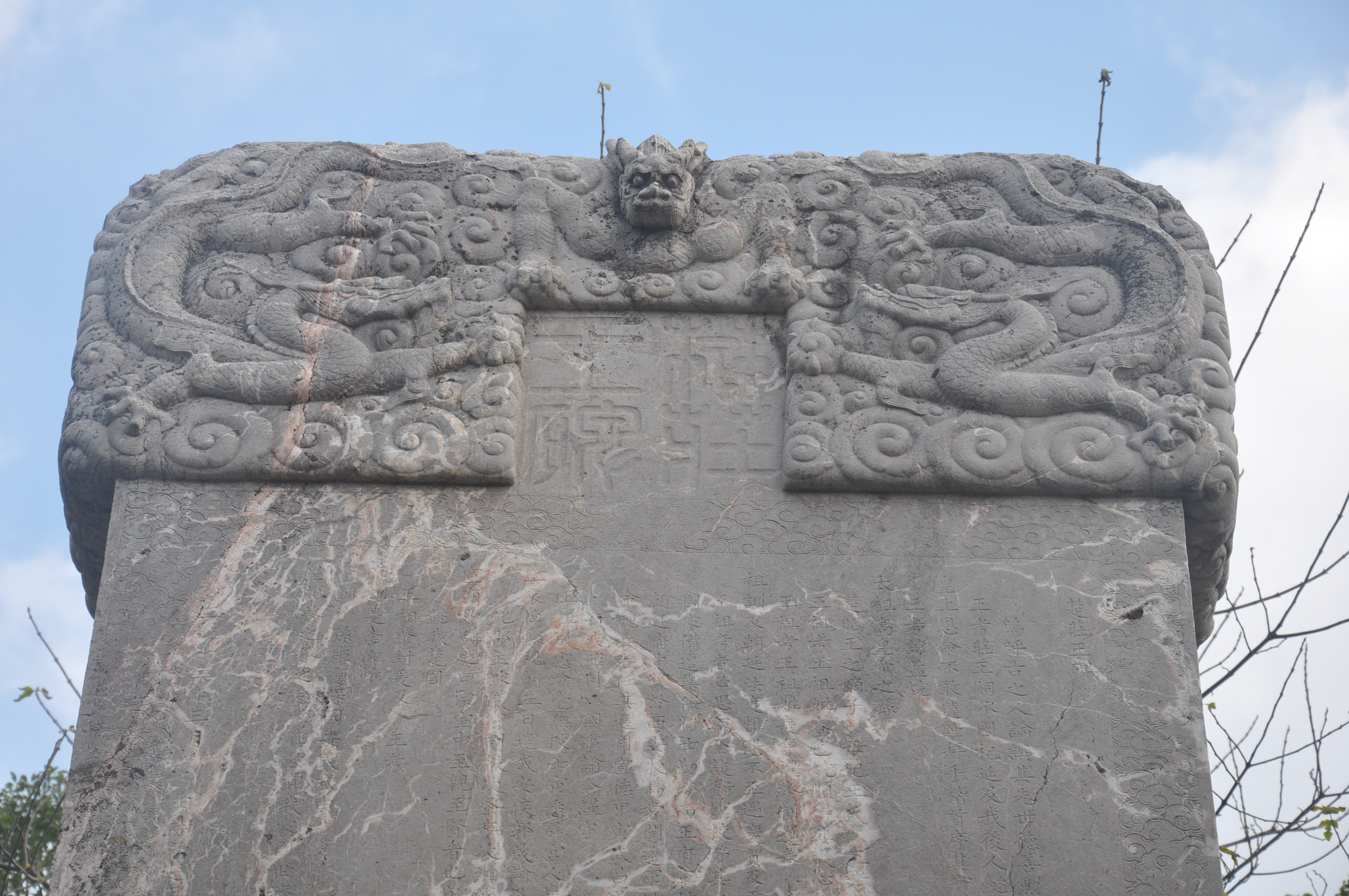
- The monument of Prince Zhuang of Chu in the Chu Princes' Tomb

Prince of Chu
- Tenure: 1424–1439
- Predecessor: Zhu Zhen, Prince Zhao
- Successor: Zhu Jini, Prince Xian
- Born: 1382
- Died: 1439 (aged 56–57)
- Issue: Zhu Jini, Prince Xian of Chu; Zhu Jichu, Prince Kang of Chu; Zhu Jili, Prince Gongding of Dong'an; Zhu Jiruan, Prince Daoxi of Daye; Princess Xinhua; Second daughter Princess Xiangxiang
Names
- Zhu Mengwan (朱孟烷)
Posthumous name
- Prince Zhuang of Chu (楚莊王)
- House: Zhu
- Father: Zhu Zhen
- Mother: Lady Wang

Zhu Mengwan (朱孟烷; 1382–1439), the 2nd Prince of Chu (楚王), was an imperial prince of the Ming dynasty. He was the third son of Zhu Zhen, Prince Zhao, and inherited the title of Prince of Chu in 1424. He died in 1439, and one year later his son, Zhu Jini, inherited.

== Consorts and issue ==
- Princess consort of Chu, of the Deng clan (楚王妃 鄧氏; d. 1442), (Note: She was made Hereditary Princess of Chu (楚世子妃) in 1400 and Princess consort of Chu in 1425.) daughter of Deng Yu, Prince Wushun of Ninghe's (寧河武順王 鄧愈) second son, Deng Ming (鄧銘)
- Lady, of the Zhu clan (诸氏)
  - Zhu Jini, Prince Xian of Chu (楚憲王 朱季堄; 1413–1443), first son
- Lady, of the Wu clan (夫人 鄔氏)
  - Zhu Jichu, Prince Kang of Chu (楚康王朱季埱; 1423–1462), second son
  - Zhu Jili, Prince Gongding of Dong'an (東安恭定王 朱季塛; 1426 – 18 October 1462), third son
- Lady, of the Li clan (李氏)
  - Zhu Jiruan, Prince Daoxi of Daye (大冶悼僖王 朱季堧), fourth son
- Unknown
  - Princess Xinhua (新化郡主), first daughter
    - Married Liu Xian (劉獻)
  - Second daughter
  - Princess Xiangxiang (湘乡郡主), third daughter
    - Married Wang Qian (王谦)

== Notes ==
Zhu Mengwan House of Zhu Born: 1382 Died: 1439
Chinese royalty
Preceded by Zhu Zhen, Prince Zhao	Prince of Chu; 1424–1439	Succeeded by Zhu Jini, Prince Xian
