= Zhu Zhen (prince) =

Chinese prince (1364–1424)

Zhu Zhen 朱楨
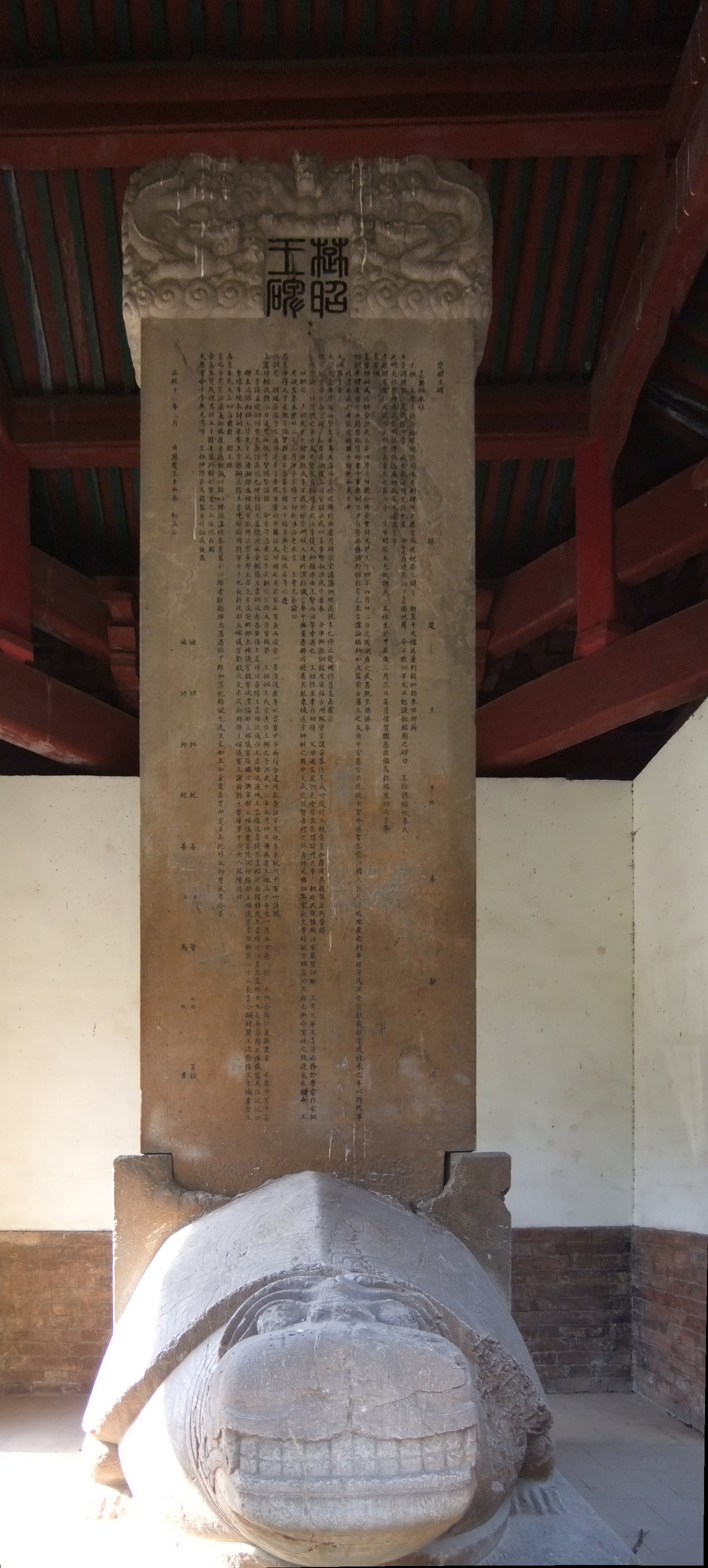
- The monument of Prince Zhao of Chu in the Chu Princes' Tomb

Prince of Chu
- Tenure: 2 May 1370 – 22 March 1424
- Successor: Zhu Mengwan, Prince Zhuang
- Born: 5 April 1364
- Died: 22 March 1424 (aged 59)
- Burial: Longquan Mountain, Wuchang
- Issue Detail: Zhu Mengwan, Prince Zhuang of Chu
Names
- Zhu Zhen (朱楨)
Posthumous name
- Prince Zhao (昭王)
- House: Zhu
- Father: Hongwu Emperor
- Mother: Consort Chong of the Hu clan

Zhu Zhen (Chinese: 朱楨; 5 April 1364 – 22 March 1424), posthumous name Prince Zhao of Chu (楚昭王), was a prince of the Ming dynasty of China. He was the sixth son of the Hongwu Emperor.

== Consorts and issue ==
- Princess consort of Chu, of the Wang clan (楚王妃 王氏; 1363–1397), daughter of Wang Bi, Marquess of Dingyuan (定遠侯 王弼)
  - Zhu Mengwan, Prince Zhuang of Chu (楚莊王 朱孟烷; 1382–1439), third son
- Lady, of the Pan clan (潘氏)
  - Zhu Mengwei, Prince Jingjian of Chongyang (崇陽靖簡王 朱孟煒; 10 April 1387 – 1448), fifth son
- Lady, of the Li clan (李氏)
  - Zhu Mengyue, Prince Jinggong of Tongshan (通山靖恭王 朱孟爚; 12 February 1388 – 1444), sixth son
- Lady, of the Hua clan (華氏)
  - Zhu Mengcan, Prince Zhuangjin of Tongcheng (通城莊靖王 朱孟燦; 6 October 1389 – 1455), seventh son
- Unknown
  - Zhu Mengcong, Prince Daojian of Bailing (巴陵悼簡王 朱孟熜; 23 May 1381 – 14 April 1397), first son
  - Zhu Mengjiong, Prince Yijiang of Yong'an (永安懿簡王 朱孟炯; 12 May 1382 – 1432), second son
  - Zhu Mengchao, Prince Anxi of Shouchang (壽昌安僖王 朱孟焯; 1383–1440), fourth son
  - Zhu Mengzhao, Prince Shunjing of Jingling (景陵順靖王 朱孟炤; 16 February 1393 – 8 January 1447), eighth son
  - Zhu Mengguang, Prince Daohui of Yueyang (岳陽悼惠王 朱孟爟; 15 March 1394 – 1426), ninth son
  - Zhu Mengju, Prince Kangjing of Jingxia (江夏康靖王 朱孟炬; 1412–1474), tenth son
  - Princess Huarong (華容郡主), first daughter
    - Married Ma Zhu (馬注)
  - Princess Yuanjing (沅江郡主), second daughter
  - Princess Linxiang (臨湘郡主), third daughter
  - Princess Qingxiang (清湘郡主), fourth daughter
    - Married Geng Xiu (耿琇)
  - Princess Yunmeng (雲夢郡主), fifth daughter
  - Princess Anxiang (安鄉郡主), sixth daughter
    - Married Wei Ning (魏寧)
  - Princess Liyang (澧陽郡主), seventh daughter
    - Married Zhang Jian (張鑑)
  - Princess Xingning (興寧郡主), eight daughter
    - Married Ge Long (葛隆)
  - Princess Qiyang (祁陽郡主), ninth daughter
    - Married Li Cheng (李澄)

== Tomb ==
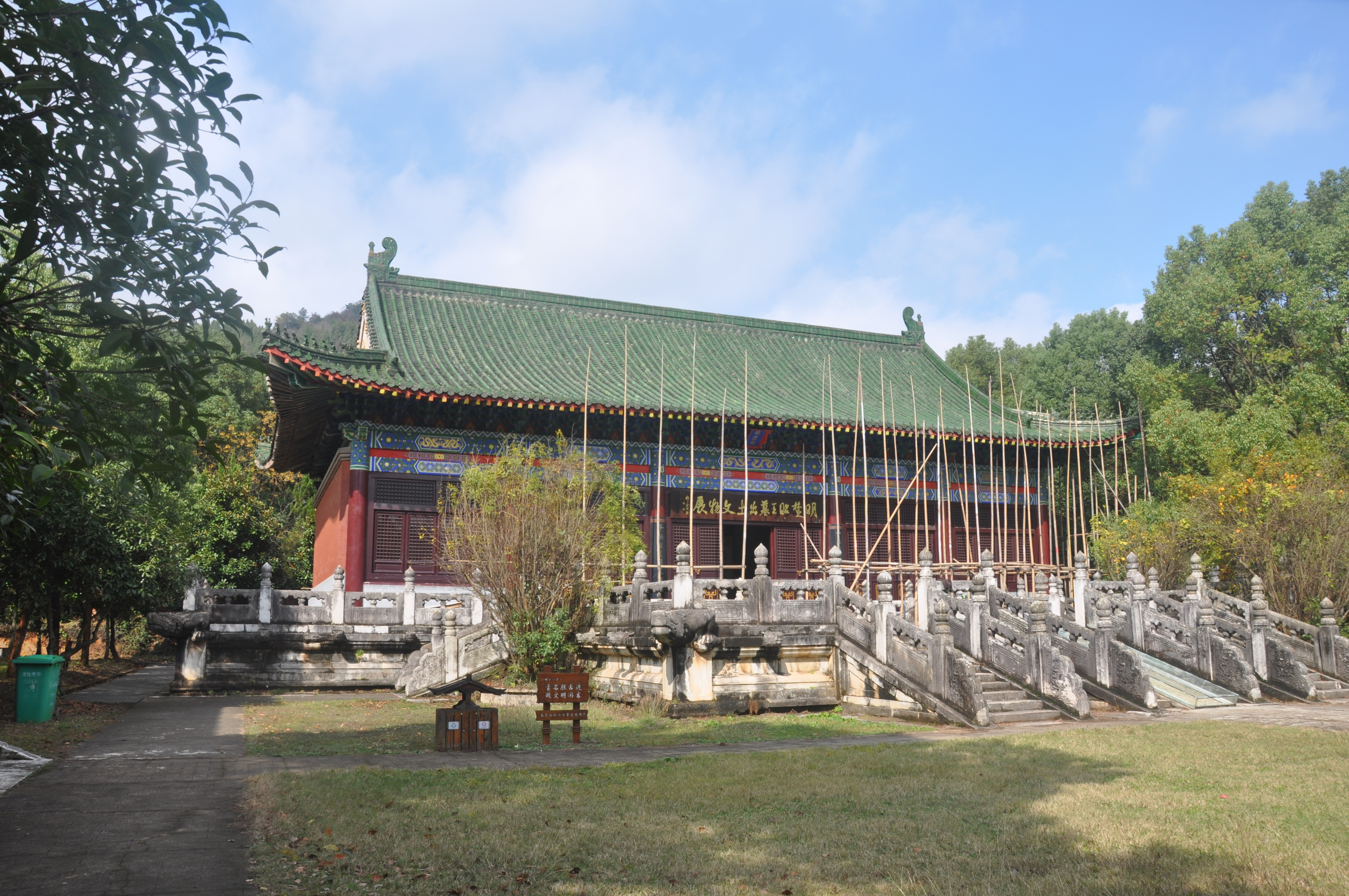

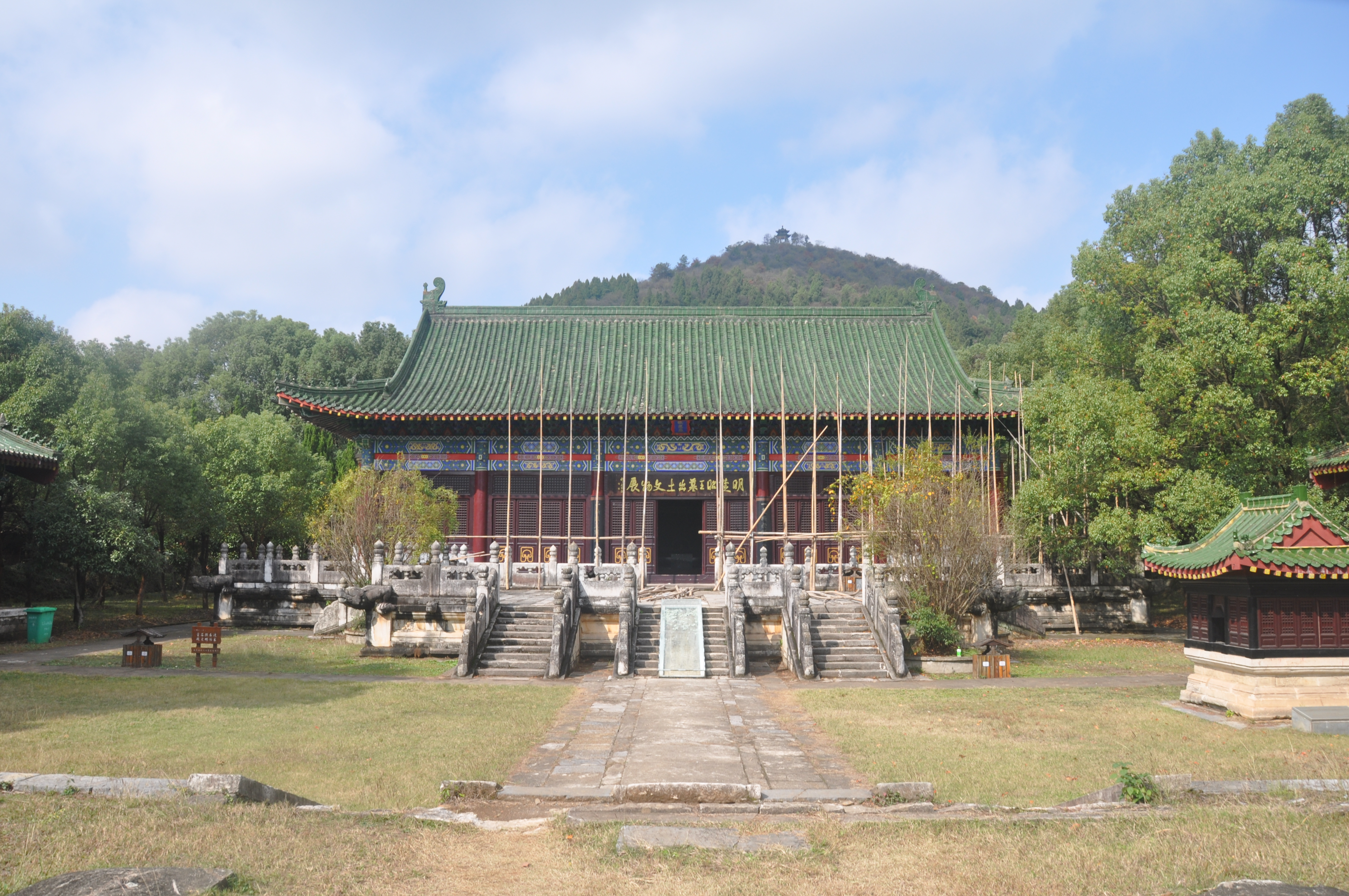

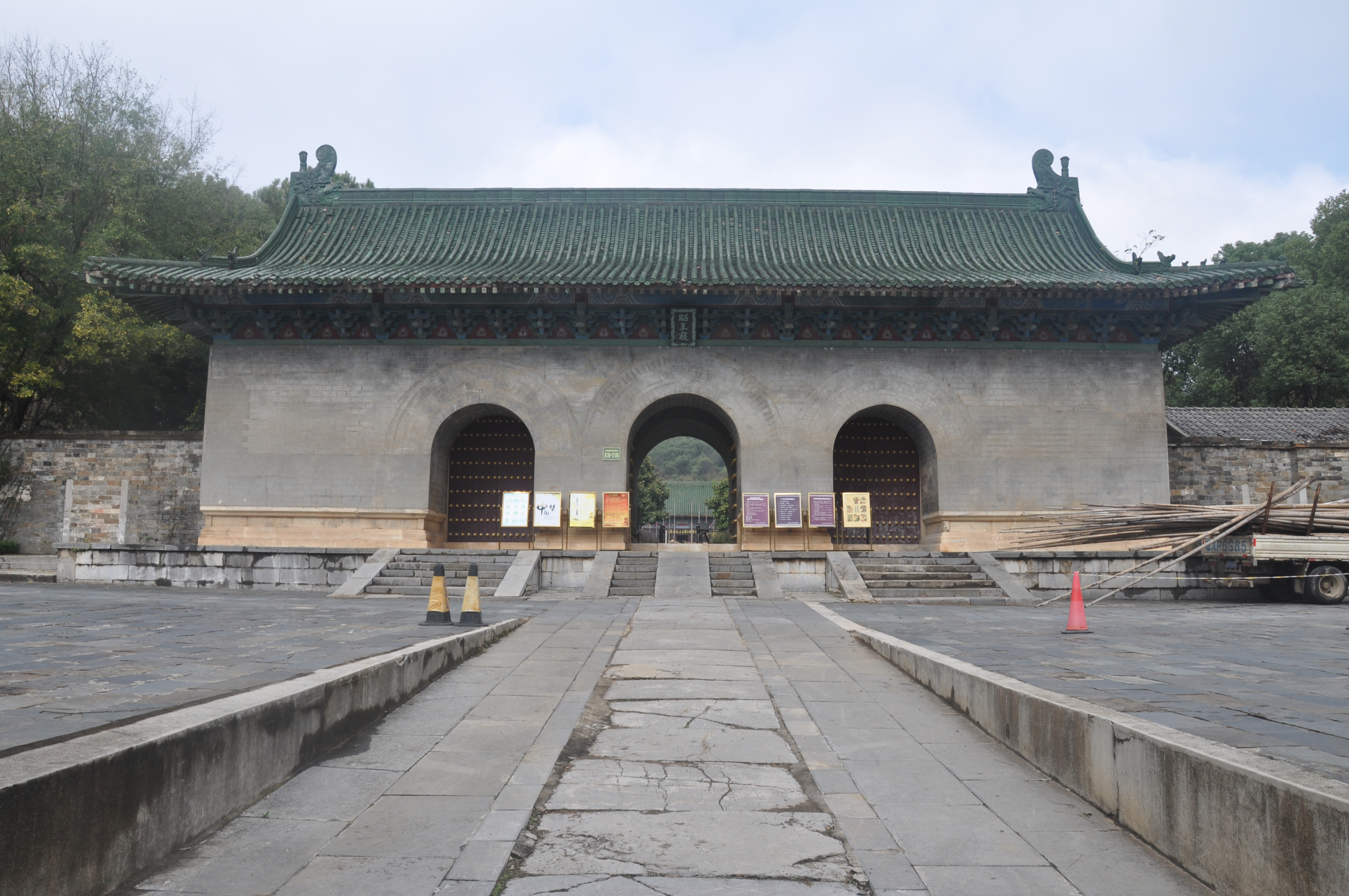

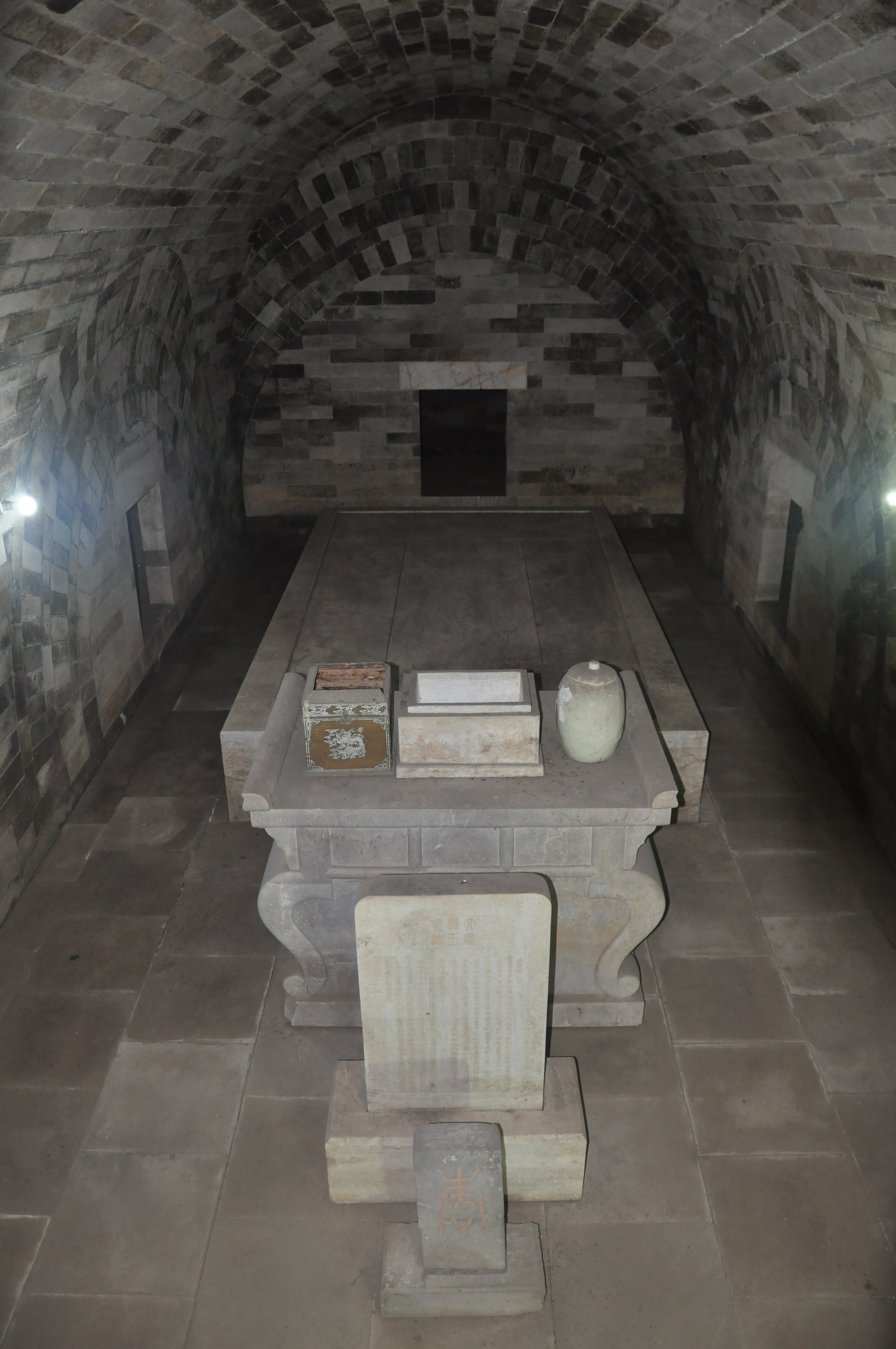

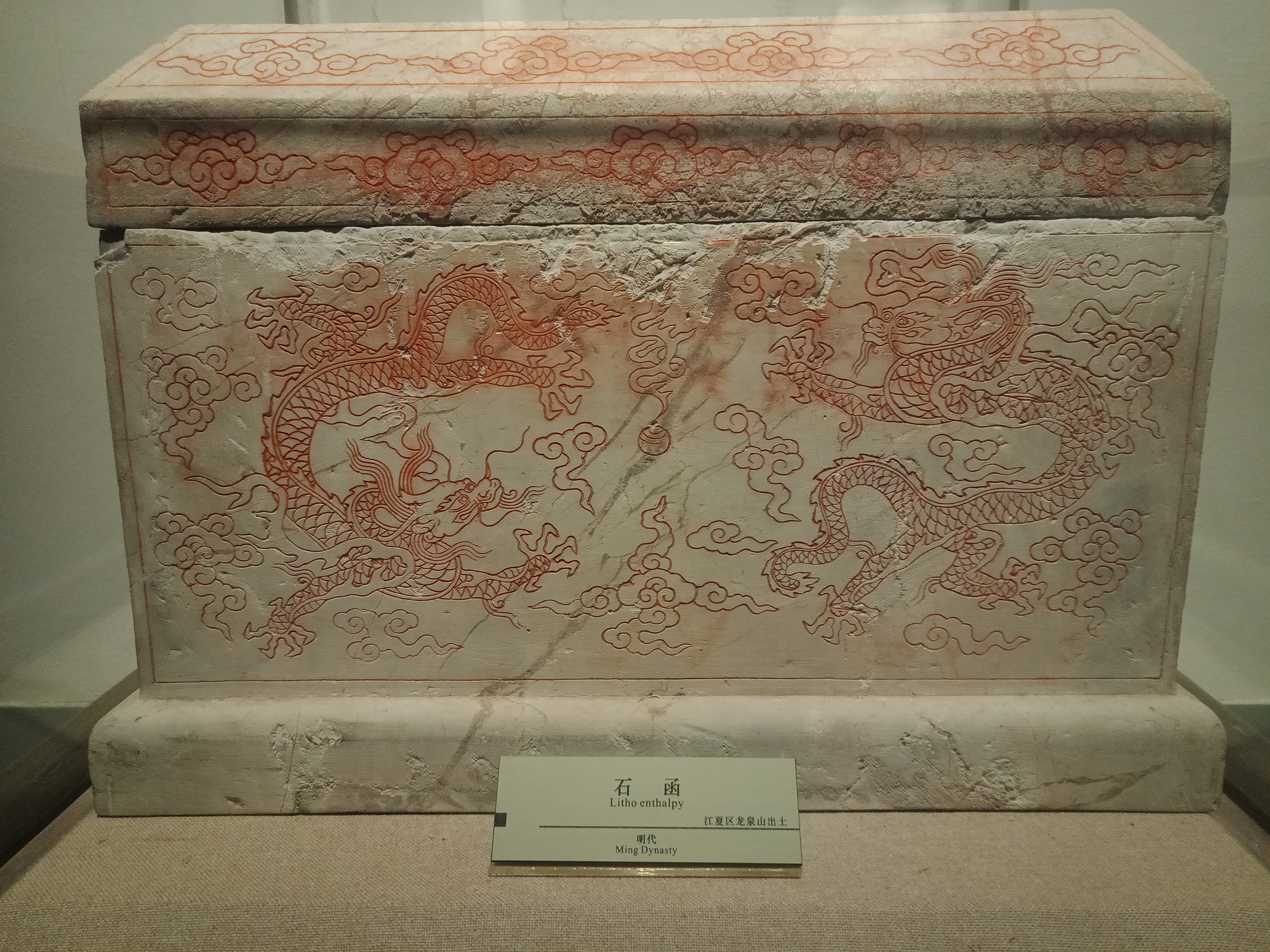

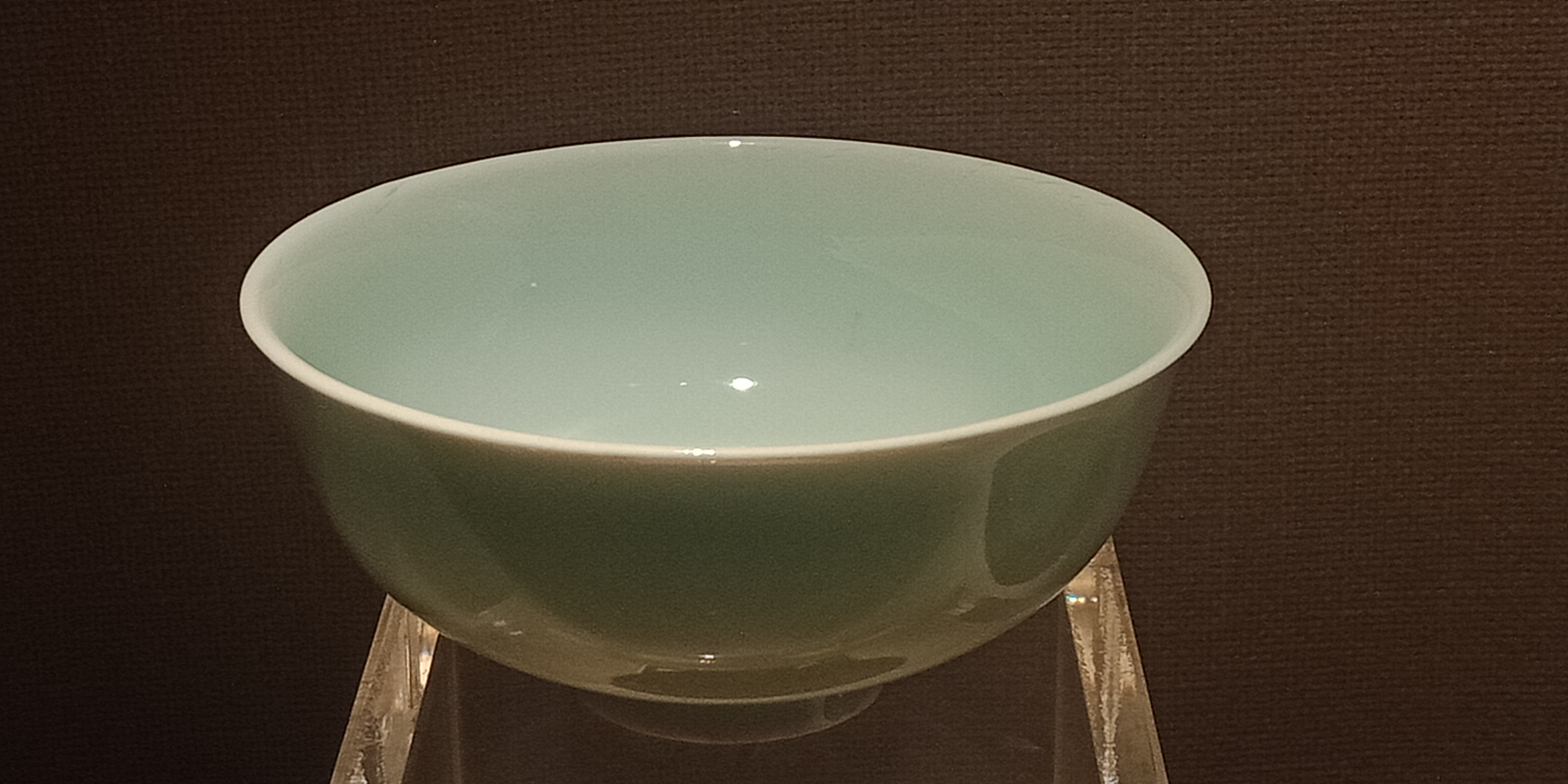

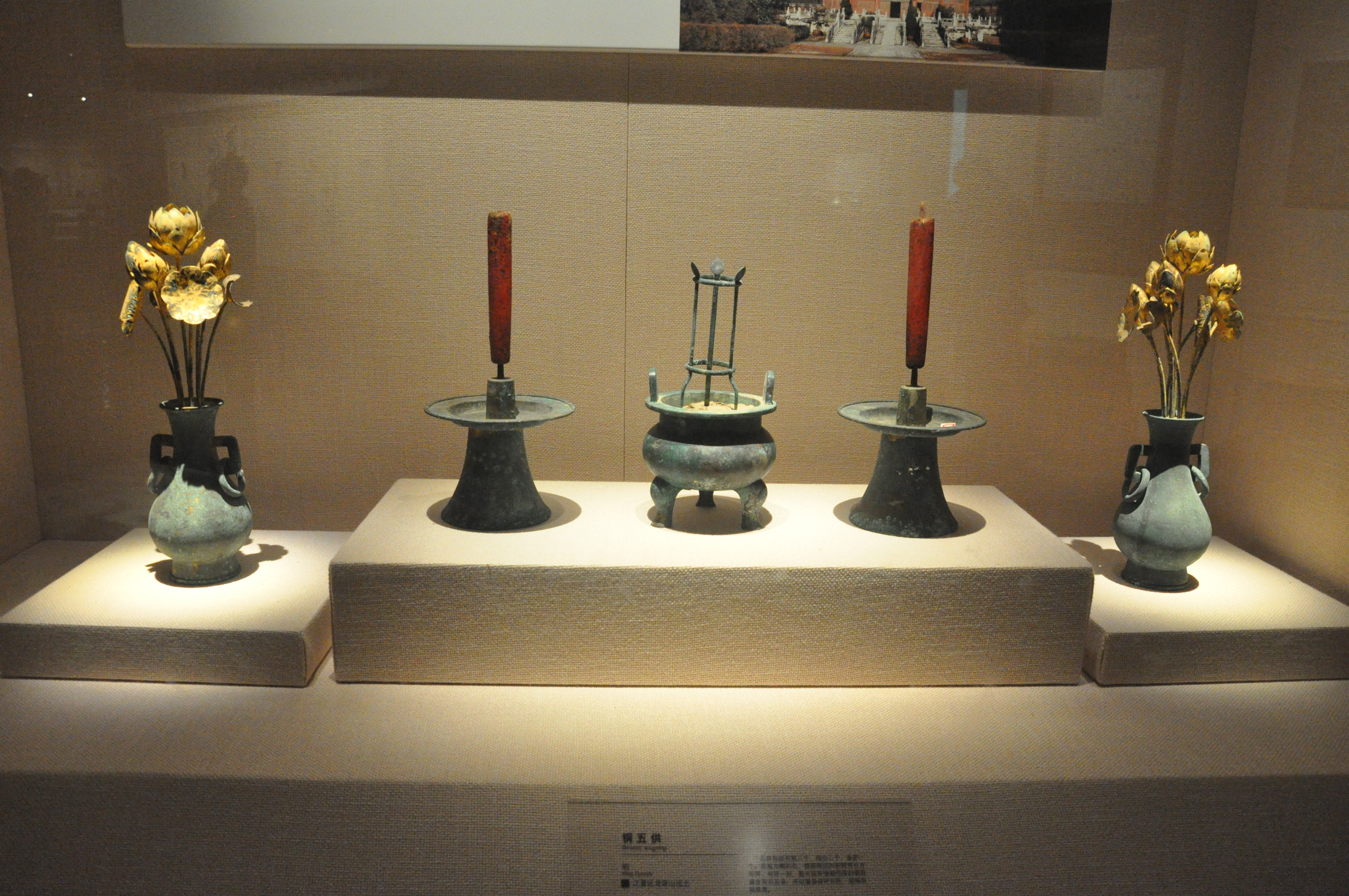

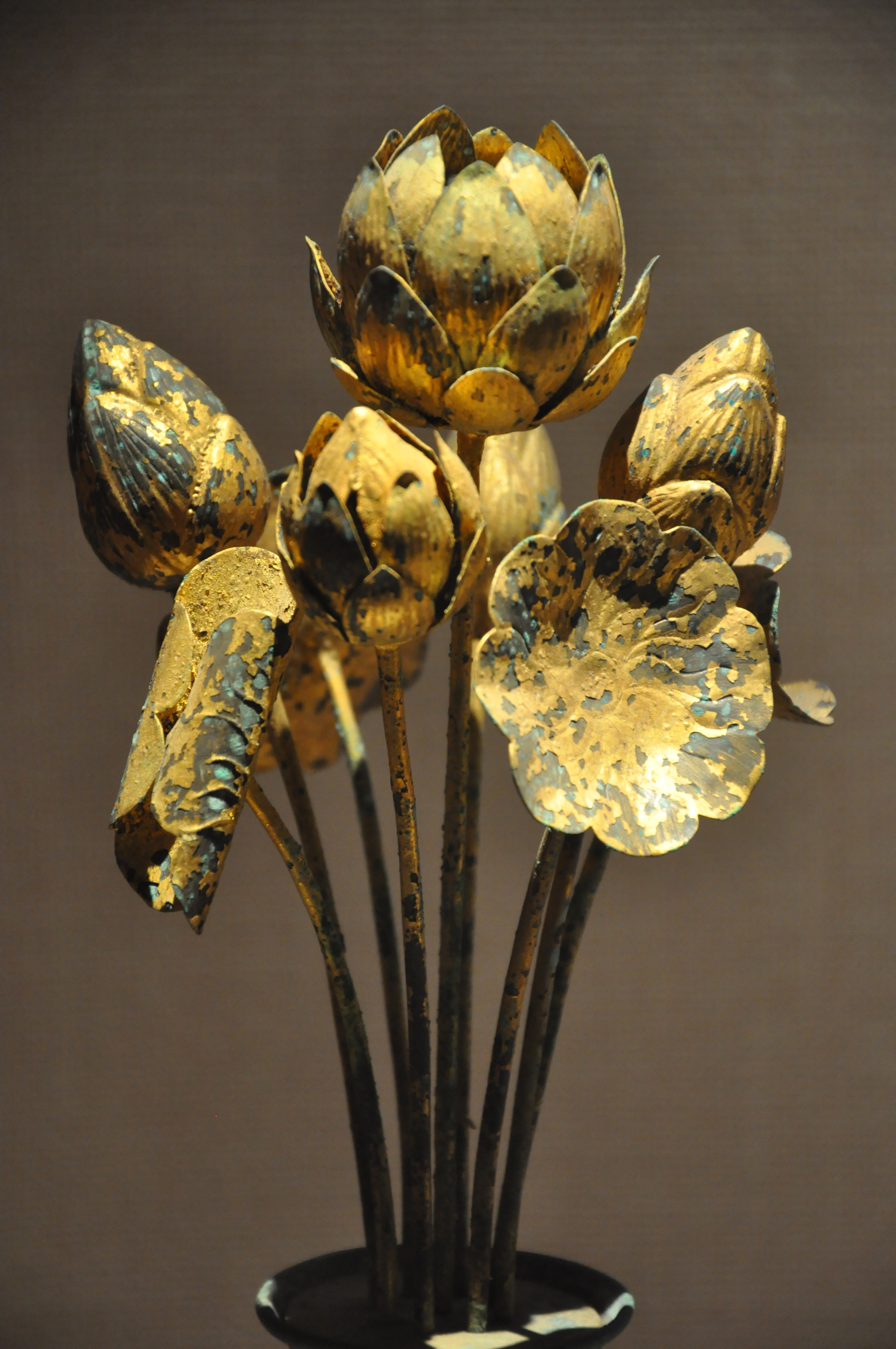

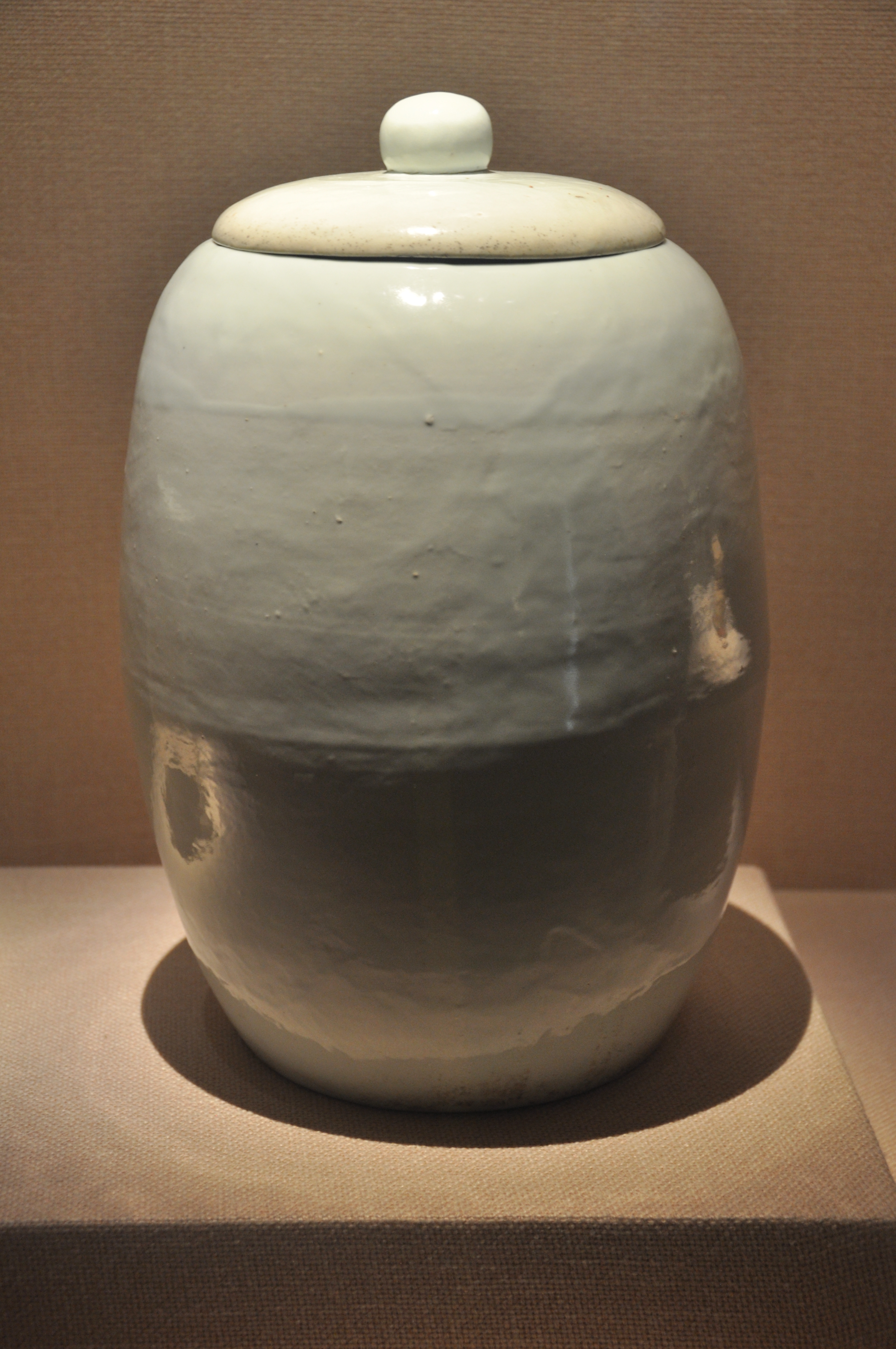

Zhu Zhen House of Zhu Born: 5 April 1364 Died: 22 March 1424
Chinese royalty
| Preceded by Title created | Prince of Chu; 2 May 1370 – 22 March 1424 | Succeeded by Zhu Mengwan, Prince Zhuang of Chu |
